= Ćukovac =

Neighborhood in Belgrade, Serbia

Coordinates: 44°50′45″N 20°24′19″E

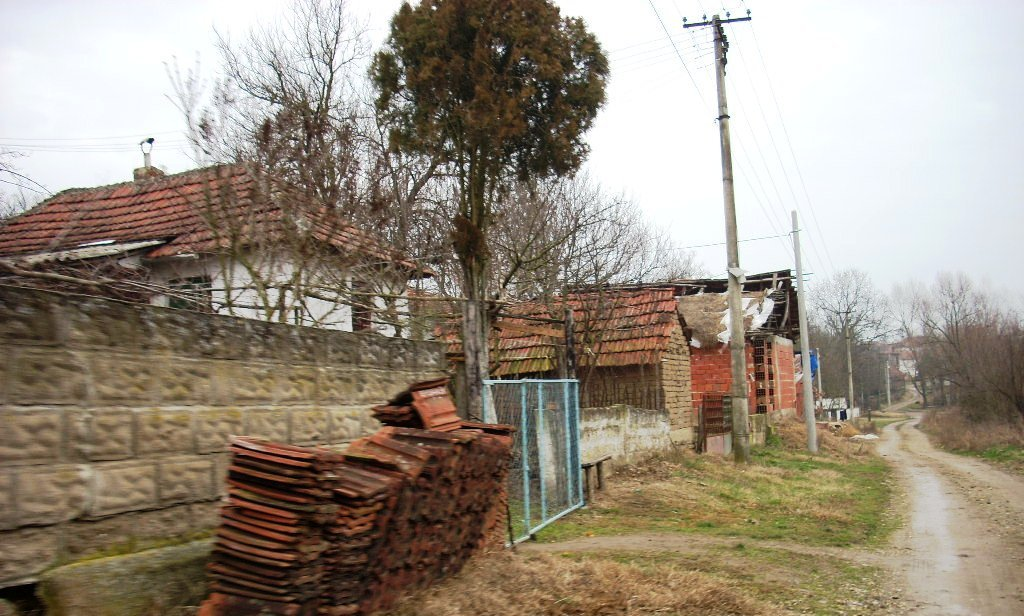
Ćukovac street.

Ćukovac (Serbian: Ћуковац) is an urban neighborhood of Belgrade, the capital of Serbia. It is located in Belgrade's municipality of Zemun.

== Location ==
Ćukovac is one of several small neighborhoods which constitute the downtown of Zemun, former separate city and today's borough and municipality of Belgrade. It borders the neighborhoods of Gardoš and Muhar (north), Donji Grad (east and south), Kalvarija (south-west), Sava Kovačević (west) and Gornji Grad (north-west). It is generally bounded by the streets of Glavna, Cara Dušana, Bežanijska and Ugrinovačka.

== Characteristics ==
Ćukovac is located on the hill of the same name, one of three hills where the old core of the town of Zemun developed. The other two hills are Gardoš, extending to the north, and Kalvarija, extending to the south, creating a crescent hilly formation. The entirely residential neighborhood is known for its short and narrow streets. Name of the hill and the neighborhood, ćukovac, means the "owl hill" (ćuk, an owl).

However, Ćukovac, Gardoš and Kalvarija hills are not natural features. Zemun loess plateau is the former southern shelf of the ancient, now dried, Pannonian Sea. Modern area of Zemun's Donji Grad was regularly flooded by the Danube and the water would carve canals through the loess. Citizens would then build pathways along those canals and so created the passages, carving the hills out of the plateau. Today it appears that Zemun is built on several hills, with passages between them turned into modern streets, but the hills are actually manmade.

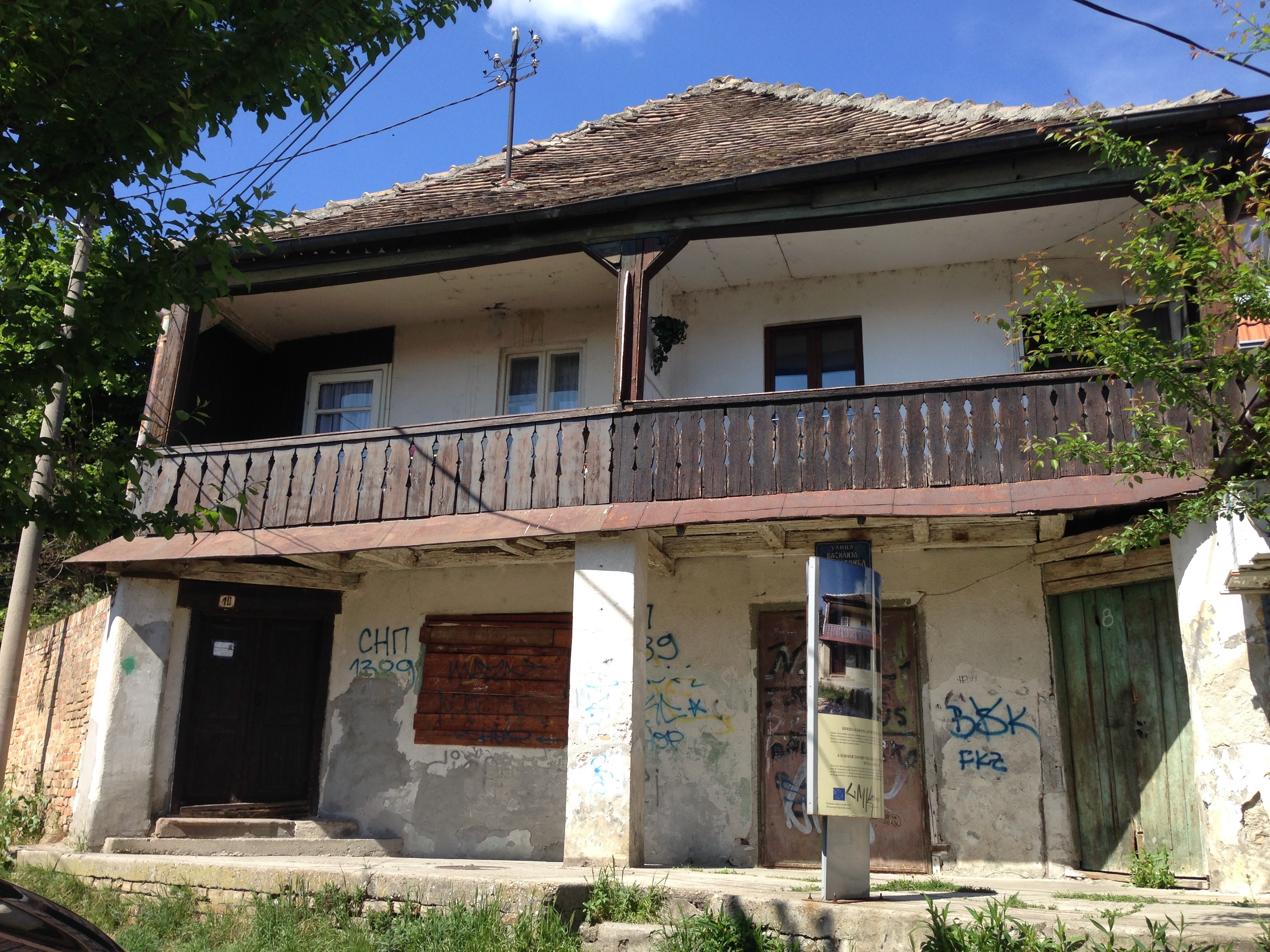
White Bear Tavern in 2017

The underground below the hill has been crisscrossed by a network of underground corridors or lagums, dating back from the period of Austrian rule in Zemun. They connect Ćukovac, Muhar, Kalvarija and Gradoš. This terrain is one of the most active landslide areas in Belgrade. Being cut into for centuries, the loess in some sections have cliffs vertical up to 90%. In the previous centuries, settlers left many vertical shafts which ventilated the lagums, drying the loess and keeping it compact. After World War II, inhabitants began to settle Ćukovac hill unaware of the lagums, especially the largest one, which covered an area of 450 m^{2} (4,800 sq ft). As there was no sufficient sewage system at that time, they built septic tanks and collected rainwater, but also as the ventilation shafts in time were covered or filled with garbage, it all made the ground wet in the course of several decades. The lagums retained the moist and began to collapse. Eventually, the walls and houses became unstable to the point of breaking façades and walls. In 1988 city authorities finally intervened as the houses began to sink in three streets. Holes were drilled to connect the surface with the largest lagum. Altogether, 22 drillings were made and 779 m^{3} (27,500 cu ft) of concrete were poured into the lagum, filling it until the ground was stabilized, but the lagum was destroyed in the process. Still, the situation is critical after almost every downpour. Though it can be built on loess, in contact with water it turns into the sand which causes all the problems. It has been suggested that a better, natural way of draining the loess is the planting the groves of Atlas cedar. It is also much cheaper than the expensive construction projects as this type of cedar has a deep and very developed roots, which drains all the atmospheric precipitations, leaving the loess dry. Additionally, Atlas cedar grows very fast in Belgrade climate, while the tree itself is an appealing park species.

White Bear Tavern, is a former kafana in the neighborhood. First mentioned in 1658, it is the oldest surviving edifice on the territory of modern Belgrade, not counting the Belgrade Fortress. However, Zemun developed completely independently from Belgrade for centuries and for the most part during the history two towns belonged to two different states. Zemun became part of the same administrative unit as Belgrade on 4 October 1929, lost a separate town status to Belgrade in 1934 and made a continuous built-up area with Belgrade only since the 1950s. Hence, the House at 10 Cara Dušana Street in Belgrade's downtown neighborhood of Dorćol is usually named as the oldest house in Belgrade, while the White Bear Tavern is titled as the oldest house in Zemun.
