= Donji Grad, Zemun =

Donji Grad Доњи Град
- Urban neighbourhood
- Location within Belgrade
- Coordinates: 44°50′31″N 20°24′47″E
- Country: Serbia
- Region: Belgrade
- Municipality: Zemun
- Time zone: UTC+1 (CET)
  - Summer (DST): UTC+2 (CEST)
- Area code: +381(0)11
- Car plates: BG

Donji Grad (Serbian Cyrillic: Доњи Град; Lower town) is an urban neighborhood of Belgrade, the capital of Serbia. It is located in Belgrade's municipality of Zemun.

== Location ==
Historical population
Year	Pop.	±%
1981	27,569	—
1991	29,060	+5.4%
2002	28,174	−3.0%

Donji Grad occupies the central part of Zemun, on the left bank of the Danube. It borders the neighborhoods of Gardoš on the north, Ćukovac and Muhar on the north-west, Kalvarija on the west, Tošin Bunar on the south-west, Retenzija on the south while the sub-neighborhood of Zemunski Kej is located along the Danube's bank. It roughly occupies the area bounded by the streets Bežanijska, Vrtlarska, 22. oktobra and Kej oslobođenja.

== Administration ==
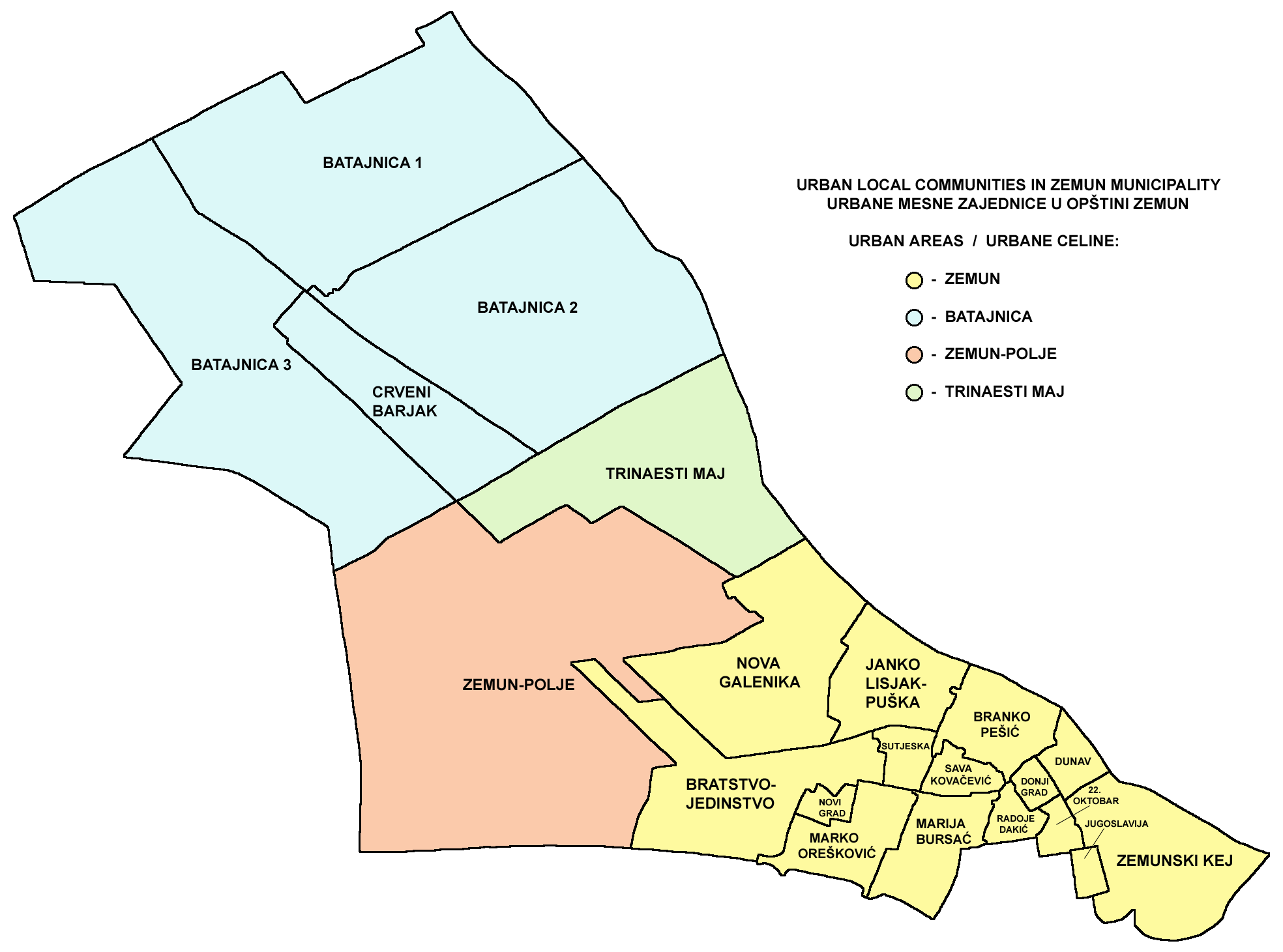
Map of Urban local communities in Zemun municipality

The local community of Donji Grad, which comprised only the small part of the neighborhood, had a population of 8,438 in 1981. Local communities of Dunav and Zemunski Kej were detached from Donji Grad in the 1980s, so the population diminished to 3,214 in 1991 and 3,104 in 2002. However, with all the local communities which formed Donji Grad (including 22.Oktobar, Jugoslavija and Radoje Dakić), population in 2002 was 28,174. By the 2011 census, most of the local communities of the urban Zemun area were merged into one called Zemun.

== Characteristics ==
Being the central part of the formerly separate town of Zemun, the major cultural, historical and administrative facilities of Zemun are located in the neighborhood of Donji Grad.

The main street in Zemun, Glavna, passes through the middle of the neighborhood. Also, almost all of the squares of Zemun are either within or bordering Donji Grad: Karađorđev, Branka Radičevića, Masarikov, Senjski, JNA, Magistratski, Oslobođenja, Veliki, and Pobede.

There are four churches: two Roman Catholic and two Serbian Orthodox (Saint Archangel Gabriel and Church of the Holy Virgin. Within the parochial complex of the Church of the Holy Virgin is the Saint Sava Home, built from 1907 to 1909 which is the only surviving work of architect Kosta Atanacković Stanišić. After World War II the building was nationalized from 1946 to 2007 when was returned to the Serbian Orthodox Church. Since April 2019, the building became a new seat of the Central Archives of the Serbian Orthodox Church. Formation of the archive itself began in 1831. The entire church complex is declared a cultural monument.

Catholic Church of the Ascension of the Blessed Virgin Mary was built on Veliki Trg from 1785 to 1817 (when the belfry was added), with service being held since 1795. It has four bells, cast in Vienna, and donated by the Austrian emperor Francis II. Described as monumental sacral complex, the baroque-style church occupies the entire block between the Veliki Trg and Zmaj Jovina Street. The church yard hosts remains of the Church of Saint Wendelin, which was located in the present Prvomajska Street, but was demolished. It acquired its present appearance after the 1848 reconstruction in the Empire style, with baroque elements. It has seven stained glass windows, and altar paintings ensemble representing Virgin Mary's Ascension, painted by Emanuel Dite in 1894. The church has an organ (originally since 1735, modern since 1910) and a library (since 2003), and is the seat of Zemun's Parish, originally established in 1721 by the Capucins. In January 2023, the government declared it a cultural monument.

At 21 Dubrovačka Street, a Sephardic synagogue was built in 1873. It was designed by Jozef Marks. The building was damaged in the Allied Easter bombing on 17 April 1944. After the war, Zemun's authorities deemed the building unrepairable and demolished it in November 1947. Residential building was later built on the location. A memorial plaque was placed on the building on 3 September 2023, commemorating 150 years since the construction of the synagogue, and 575 Zemun Jews who were taken to the Jasenovac concentration camp and murdered. Nearby, at 5 Rabina Alkalaja Street, still exist an Ashkenazi synagogue.

Elementary school "Svetozar Miletić" in modern Nemanjina Street was founded in 1728 and is one of the oldest surviving educational facilities in Serbia. Founded by the monks, it was the first public school in Zemun, originally known as the "German School" and located in the northern section of the neighborhood, at Veliki Trg. It was later called "City School", "Main School", "General Junior Public Boys School" (in 1876) and "State Elementary Co-Ed School" when the first Sokol Sports Society was founded. In 1930 it was renamed to "Prince Tomislav", and the firs kindergarten in Zemun was opened within the school premises. It bears its present name since 1952.

Zemun's open farmers market and a commercial zone are situated along the main road. Also located in Donji Grad are Zemun's City Hospital, Sports' Hall "Pinki", Zemun's Gymnasium, the faculty of agriculture and the Magistrate building, the seat of the Zemun's municipal assembly. The plateau in front of the church was adapted into the combined central city square-farmers market area in 2011, with additional reconstructions and adaptations in 2016, 2020 and 2023.

Zemun's largest park, the City park, lies below the main street. There are two other smaller parks in the neighborhood, Yugoslav Army Park (0.82 hectares (2.0 acres)), and Sonja Marinković Park (0.53 hectares (1.3 acres)).

In May 2021, it was announced that the monument to Branko Pešić, the mayor of Zemun (1955–58) and of Belgrade (1965-74), will be placed in the pedestrian zone. Work of sculptor Jovan Kratohvil, it will be dedicated in the autumn of 2021. It will be placed in the square of Veliki Trg. Originally planned location was the nearby square of Magistarski Trg, but the new position was selected for ambient reasons. However, the monument was finished only in February 2023 when it was handed over to the city administration. It was then suggested that the monument should be placed in front of the Pinki sports hall, and that the entire plateau in front of the hall should be named after Pešić.

During the reconstruction of the Glavna Street, a previously unknown underground corridor, lagum, was discovered in July 2023, which made national news due to the generally mysterious attributes of such corridors in city's mythology. After the inspection, it was concluded that the corridor was made from modern bricks, not the old, so-called Schwabian bricks which were longer and wider meaning it was built in 1935 at the earliest, and probably was part of the sewage system. Despite not having historical importance, it was not demolished but buried again.

== Protection ==
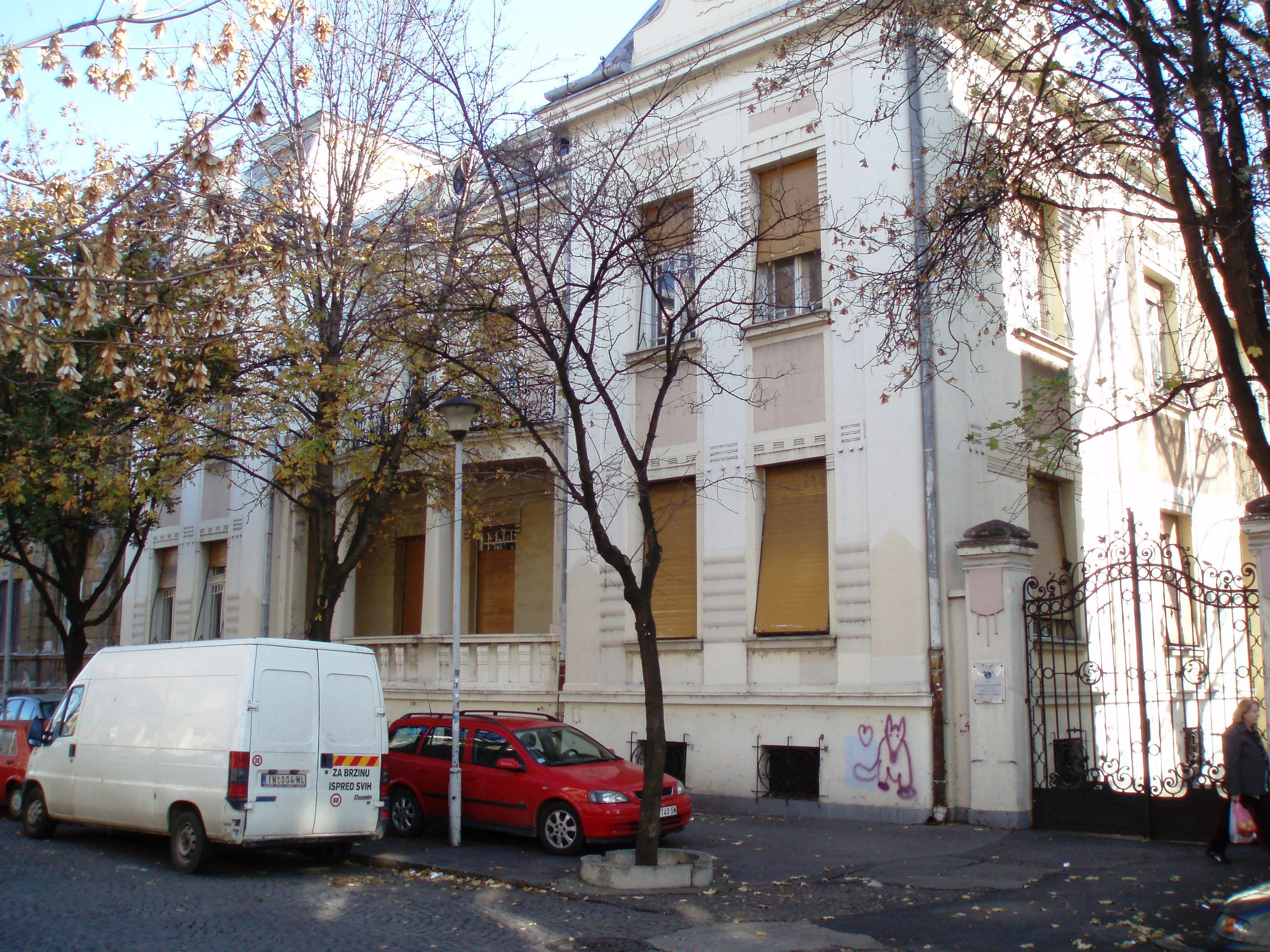
The Binder house, built in 1911

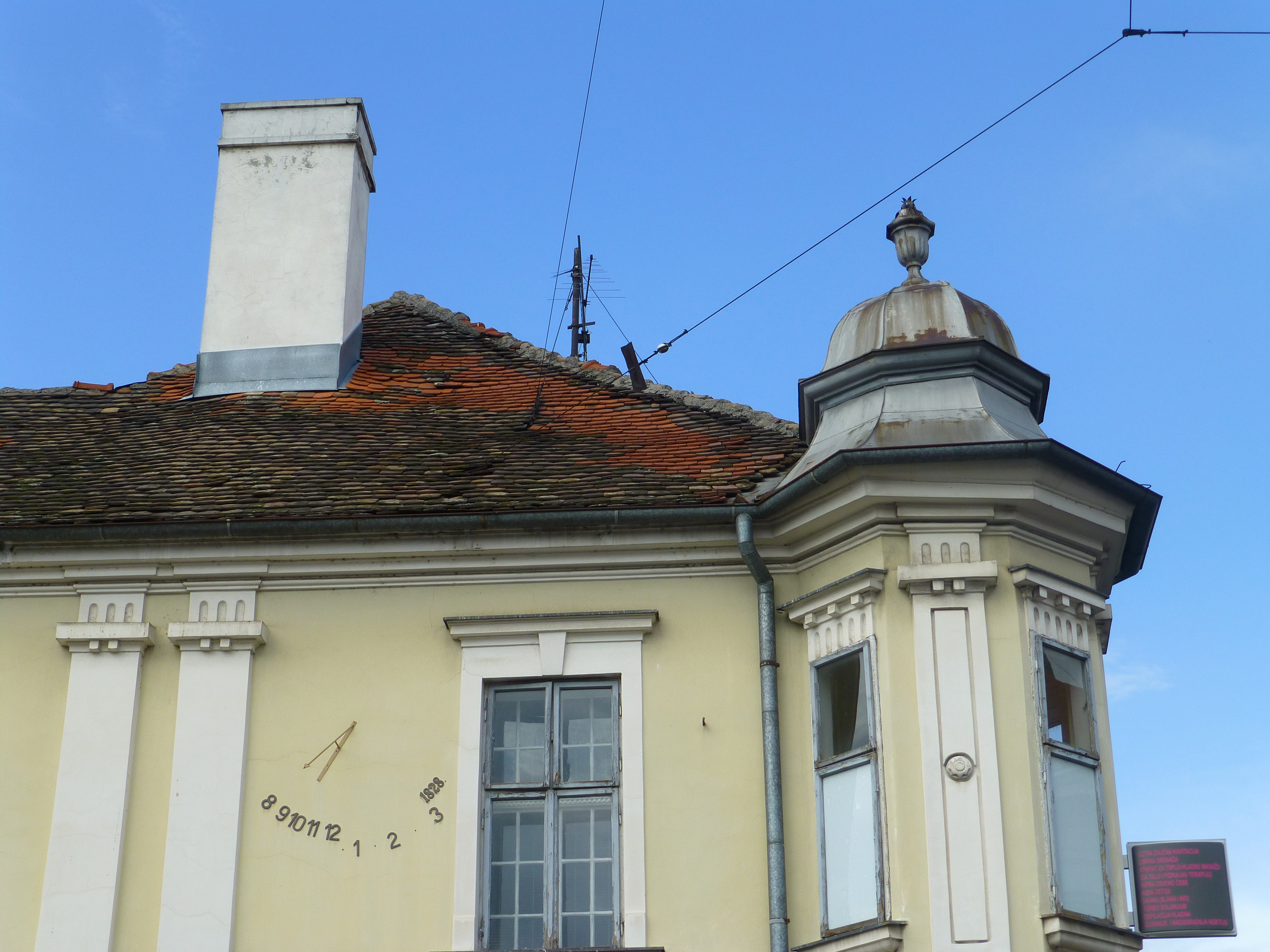
House with Sundial

Binder House

The Binder house, located in 4 Dr Petra Markovića street, was built in 1911. The representative, residential one-floor house was projected by Franjo Jenč, who constructed over 100 objects in Zemun, for the industrialist Mavra Binder. It was designed in the Vienna Secession style and is the "unique architectural concept within the Old Core of Zemun". It was declared a cultural monument in April 2013 and today is the location of the military ambulance.

Herzl House

The Herzl house is located at 17 Gundulićeva street. Present house is built after the old one was demolished in the early 20th century. The old house was a birthplace of Jakob Herzl, father of Theodor Herzl, founder of modern Zionism. The family emigrated to Budapest before Theodor was born. The new house was designed by Jozef Marks in the Vienna Secession style. The house is a rarity in Belgrade and the entire Serbia because of the unique façade which is ornamented with five plaster trees. The one-floor house is privately owned, but as it is located within the Old Core of Zemun, the Belgrade Institute for the monuments protection drafter a reconstruction plan for the façade in 2011, but as of 2018 it has not been done.

House and vine at 4 Gospodska Street

A house and the adjoining grapevine in 4 Gospodska street are protected by the law. The house is protected as the cultural monument while the vine was protected by the city on 21 September 2014 as the natural monument. The present vine was planted c1910 and still bears fruits. It is of the red grape variety, specifically the Rosette (Seibel 1000), or, as it is called in Serbia, the "Frenchman". Though local chroniclers claimed that the vine was planted already in 1827, when the house itself was built, the experts say that the hybrid of this type couldn't be planted before 1865. Rosette variety has since then completely disappeared from Serbia.

The building was built in 1827. An advertisement from 1878, for the grape juice, survived. Small beverage factory and a store were located in the house at the time. The house was originally built by the Puljo family, the printmakers, but was later obtained by the merchant Živanović family, who adapted it into the store. Popularly nicknamed "Zemunka" ("Zemun girl"), the vine is still vital and spreading.

During the massive Allied 1944 Easter bombing of Belgrade on 17 April 1944, the house was hit. The front site of the building was destroyed, including the Secession style façade. Another consequence of the bombing was that the water well in the yard was buried and remained so until today. There were two fatalities in the house, but the vine survived. When some communal works were done in the 2010s, it was discovered that the root of the vine spread beneath the half of the yard, reaching the buried well and draining water from there.

Belgrade University Faculty of Agriculture examined the grapes. The French hybrid originated from after 1860. The French cultivars were grafted on the American cultivars after the massive Phylloxera epidemic caused the Great French Wine Blight, which actually destroyed vineyards in entire Europe. The "Seibel 1000" cultivar reached Serbia in 1903. Some 30 vines were planted in the faculty's experimental farm in Radmilovac. Grapes from there are being mixed with that from Zemun and experimental wines have been produced. The grafts of the "Zemunka" have been transplanted to several vineyards in Serbia, including the ones at Oplenac. The grape contains 23% of sugar and, as typical for the French varieties, manganese and iron.

House with sundial

Protected, corner building at the corner of Dubrovačka and Glavna streets is known as the House with Sundial. First part of the house was built in 1823. On the facade looking on the Dubrovačka Street, a sundial was placed in 1828, which is still operational. It was damaged in 2000 by the workers who adapted the facade, but was repaired later that year. The sundial has an unusual layout, with numbers 8, 9, 10, 11 and 12 on the right side, and 1, 2 and 3 on the left side. It is the oldest sundial in Belgrade. Below the roof of the main facade is the coat of arms with an anchor.

Academic Jovan Subotić spent his last years in this house. Newer part of the building was added in 1908. The house was damaged in the Allied bombing in 1944, but the sundial was unharmed.

Spirta House

The Spirta House, built in 1855 in 9 Glavna street, was declared a cultural monument in 1965, so as the large part of Donji Grad which constitutes the Spatial Cultural-Historical Unit of Great Importance of Old Core of Zemun, which was protected in 1979.
