= White Bear Tavern =

Kafana in Belgrade

Coordinates: 44.845981°N 20.408145°E

White Bear Tavern (Serbian: Кафана "Бели медвед", romanized: Kafana "Beli medved") is a former kafana in Belgrade, in the municipality of Zemun. First mentioned in 1658, it is the oldest surviving edifice in the territory of modern Belgrade, not counting the Belgrade Fortress. However, Zemun developed completely independently from Belgrade for centuries and for the most part during the history two towns belonged to two different states. Zemun became part of the same administrative unit as Belgrade on 4 October 1929, lost a separate town status to Belgrade in 1934 and made a continuous built-up area with Belgrade only since the 1950s. Hence, the House at 10 Cara Dušana Street in Belgrade's downtown neighborhood of Dorćol is usually named as the oldest house in Belgrade, while the White Bear Tavern is titled as the oldest house in Zemun. In 2023, it was declared a cultural monument.

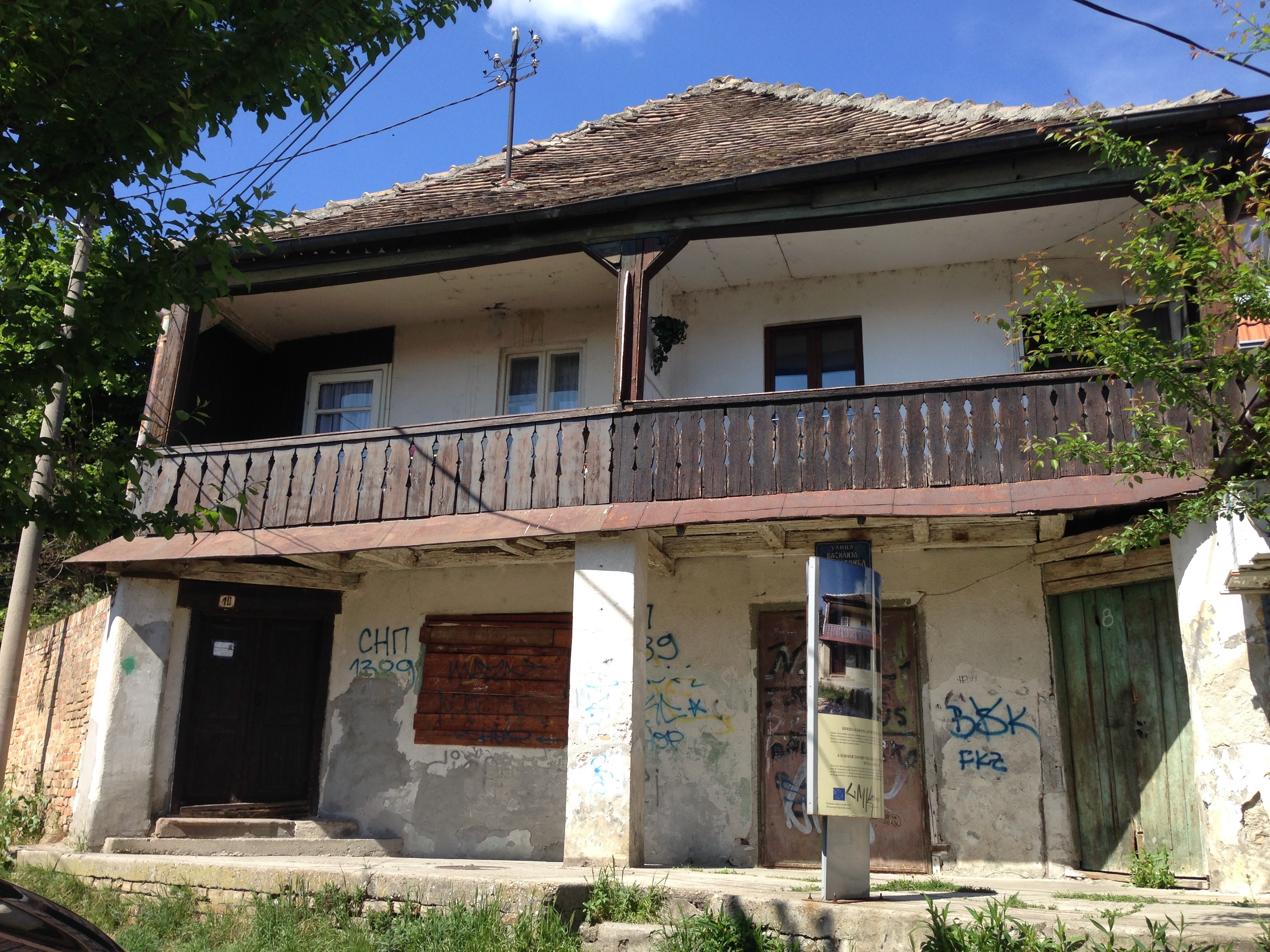
White Bear Tavern in 2017

== Location ==
The house is located in the neighborhood of Ćukovac, at 10 Vasilija Vasilijevića street, not far away from Muhar and Zemun's main street, Glavna.

== History ==
It is not recorded when the house was built, but it is believed that it originates from the first half of the 17th century. French traveler Michel Quiclet visited Zemun in 1658, then part of the Ottoman Empire. He mentions the house as the largest of three khans in town. The house is also depicted on the 1663 military map of Zemun, made by the German cartographer Heinrich Ottendorf. House is mentioned in 1717, when Prince Eugene of Savoy dwelled in it, preparing for the siege of Belgrade. The object was later named the "Zartaken" and as such appeared on the oldest urban plan of Zemun from 1740. The plan numbered 550 objects in town, in 13 streets. Zartaken was German name for čardak, the guardhouse and watchtower.

During the 18th century, the ground floor was turned into kafana. The house was remodeled few times, the upper floor was formed around the open porch, and the floor annex was added above the northern part. All these changes happened before 1830. In the late 19th century, it was owned by Naum Nikolić, who then sold it to Todor Marić Gačula while in 1927 Marko Todorović Čanak bought the premises. It is not known when and how the kafana got its name. It was originally called only Kod medveda ("Bear's"). The kafana was noted for its cimer, a hanging tin plaque with an image of the standing bear. As the town's house painters gathered in the kafana, celebrating their guild's festivities, they often painted the cimer, changing the color of the bear, into black, grey or white. As they mostly painted it in white, the locale became known as the "White Bear". Though named after the paint, white bear is Serbian name for polar bear. Todorović, who was nicknamed Marko Medved after the kafana, owned the tavern until 1948 when the state nationalized it, leaving the Todorović family to live in the residential area on the first floor. Until the early 1960s, when it was closed, the tavern was quite popular.

== Architecture ==
The house is the only remaining example of the typical Balkan architecture in the Old Core of Zemun, from the period of Ottoman rule (16–17th century). It is one-storey edifice, built in the bondruk manner, with timber construction filled with unbaked bricks. It had commercial venues on the ground floor with residential rooms above. It is the oldest surviving edifice on the urban territory of Belgrade and was location of the first kafana in Zemun.

== Underground ==
A two-forked underground corridor, called lagum, was dug beneath the house. One is 10 m (33 ft) and the other is 14 m (46 ft) long. The walls are laid with bricks. While the house served as the kafana, they were used as a refrigerator. During the winters, when the Danube would freeze, the ice was cut with the saw and brought into the lagum. The food and drinks were kept in the layers of ice and straw. They were called ledenica ("ice room") and were usually allowed to be entered only once a day. As the corridors had good ventilation and a proper temperature, they were used as the wine cellar, too. There are additional lagums around the house. One, which is directly accessible from the living room of the present tenants on the first floor, is used as the larder, since the temperature is constant throughout the year, at 17 °C (63 °F).

== Today ==
The house is placed under the "preliminary protection", but it hasn't been kept by the city or preserved in any way. In February 2020 it was announced that if government provides funds in April, the project of the full reconstruction will be drafted by the Institute for the Cultural Monuments Protection. It is a prerequisite for placing the building under the full legal protection.

The projects for reconstructions of the façade, and of the entire structure, were drafted in 2021. On 25 August 2023, the state government declared White Bear Tavern a cultural monument.

== See also ==
- House at 10 Cara Dušana Street
