= Galenika =

Galenika can refer to:

- Galenika a.d., a pharmaceutical company from Zemun (Belgrade), Serbia.
  - Galenika, Zemun, an urban neighborhood in Zemun
  - FK Zemun (formerly FK Galenika), football club from Zemun
