= Gardoš =

Gardoš Гардош
- Urban neighbourhood
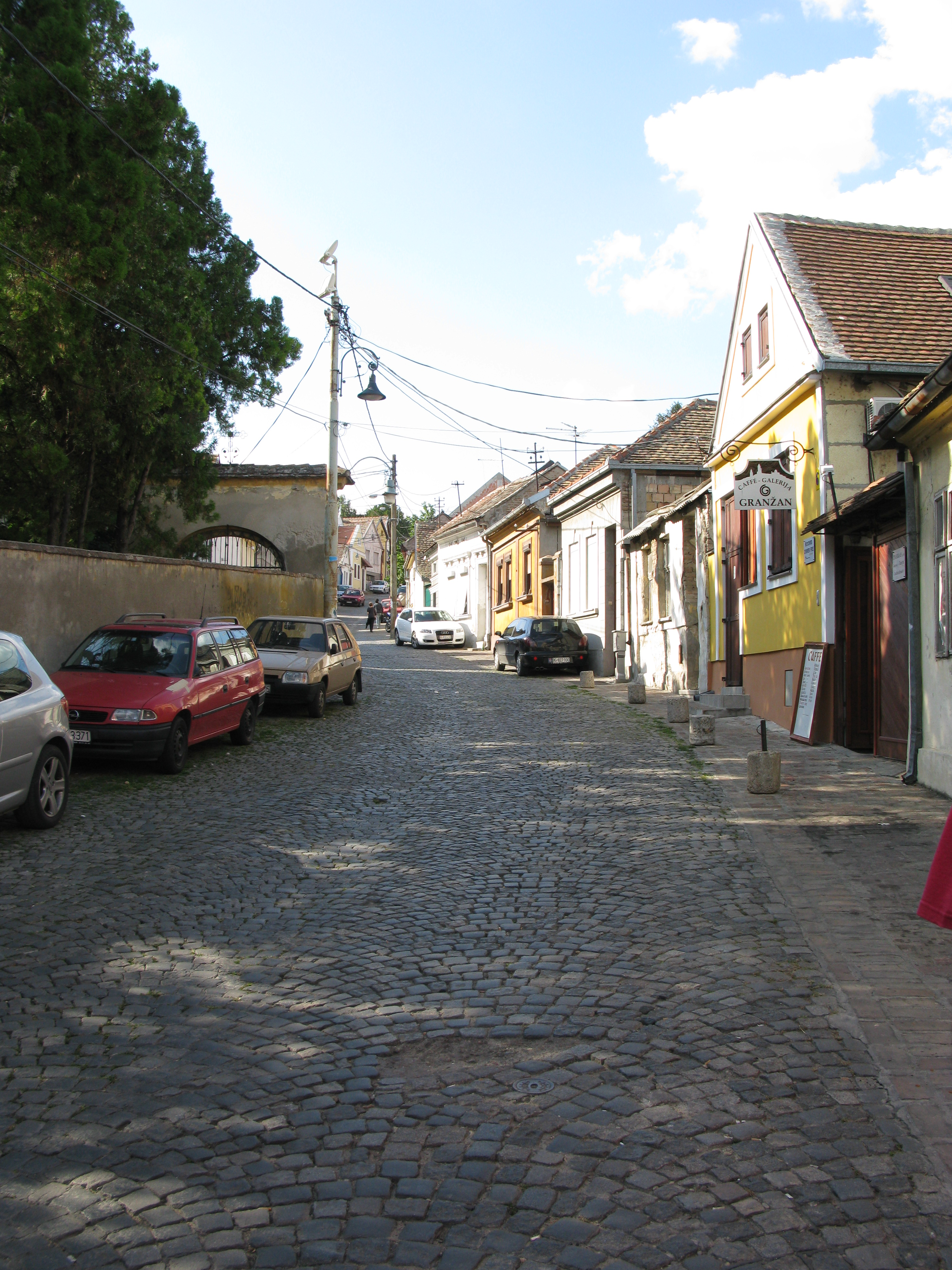
- Sinđelićeva street in Gardoš

- Location within Belgrade
- Coordinates: 44°50′56″N 20°24′23″E
- Country: Serbia
- Region: Belgrade
- Municipality: Zemun
- Time zone: UTC+1 (CET)
  - Summer (DST): UTC+2 (CEST)
- Area code: +381(0)11
- Car plates: BG

Gardoš (Serbian Cyrillic: Гардош; Hungarian: Gárdos) is an urban neighborhood of Belgrade, the capital of Serbia. It is located in Belgrade's municipality of Zemun. Located on the slopes of the hill of the same name, with its tower and preserved old architecture, Gardoš is the major historical landmark of Zemun. Remnants of the Gardoš Fortress, built in the 14th century and the 15th century, are the oldest surviving parts of Zemun.

== Location ==
Gardoš is one of three hills on which the historical core of Zemun was built (other two are Ćukovac and Kalvarija). Gardoš rises on the right bank of the Danube and is the natural lookout to the area across the river (Crvenka section of the Pančevački Rit in the municipality of Palilula). Gardoš borders the neighborhoods of Gornji Grad on the northwest, Ćukovac and Muhar on the south and Donji Grad on the southeast.

== Geography ==
Gardoš, Ćukovac and Kalvarija hills are not natural features. Zemun loess plateau is the former southern shelf of the ancient, now dried, Pannonian Sea. Modern area of Zemun's Donji Grad was regularly flooded by the Danube and the water would carve canals through the loess. Citizens would then build pathways along those canals and so created the passages, carving the hills out of the plateau. After massive 1876 floods, local authorities began the construction of the stony levee along the Danube's bank. Levee, a kilometer long, was finished in 1889. Today it appears that Zemun is built on several hills, with passages between them turned into modern streets, but the hills are actually manmade. Due to its position above the river, it has been an excellent military lookout through history. The hilly appearance is enhanced by the centuries of fortification of the Gardoš, mostly using stone from Belgrade's side of the Sava river, which made Gardoš even higher.

Loess terrain of Gardoš, Kalvarija, Ćukovac is one of the most active landslide areas in Belgrade. Being cut into for centuries, the loess in some sections have cliffs vertical up to 90%. Additionally, this area is known for lagums, a vast network of underground corridors, which were used for supply and eventual hiding and evacuation. In the previous centuries, settlers left many vertical shafts which ventilated the lagums, drying the loess and keeping it compact. As the city of Zemun grew and got urbanized, the shafts in time were covered or filled with garbage. That way, the corridors retained the moist and began to collapse. Situation is critical after almost every downpour.

The lagums of Zemun, their length and branching, are sources of numerous urban myths. One is that some lagums, originating from a cellar below the vertical stairs at the bottom of the Gardoš Tower, actually go all the way below the Sava river, crossing to Belgrade and connecting Gardoš Fortress with the Belgrade Fortress across the river. Story originated in World War I when Austrians actually hit the tower, bombing it from the Danube. Left staircase which lead to the cellar, collapsed burying the cellar. Local population believed this was done on purpose by the Austrians, to hide the underground corridors. After the war, a tunnel was dug from the present ground-floor gallery into the buried cellar, but it turned out there were no corridors out of it. Still, the myth survives.

== Characteristics ==
=== Neighborhood ===
Archaeological surveys showed that the area of the modern hill was almost continually inhabited during the past millennia, as the remains from the Neolithic, Eneolithic and Iron Age (the Celts) have been found. The cliff-like ending section of the former Bežanija Loess Ridge was suitable for habitation for several reasons: it was an excellent natural lookout as the surrounding region is mostly flat; the land, prior to full urbanization, was fertile; elevation above the Danube's bank prevented damage from the regular floods of the surrounding lowlands. Later, the area was ruled by the Romans, Huns, Avars, Slavs and Hungarians.

For the most part, the neighborhood preserved its old looks, with narrow, still mostly cobblestoned streets unsuitable for modern vehicles, and individual residential houses. As a curiosity, almost half of the neighborhood is occupied by Zemun's largest graveyard. As a popular promenade become somewhat of a fashionable place since the 1990s, several modern restaurants were built near the top of the hill with the view on the Danube.

=== Fortress ===
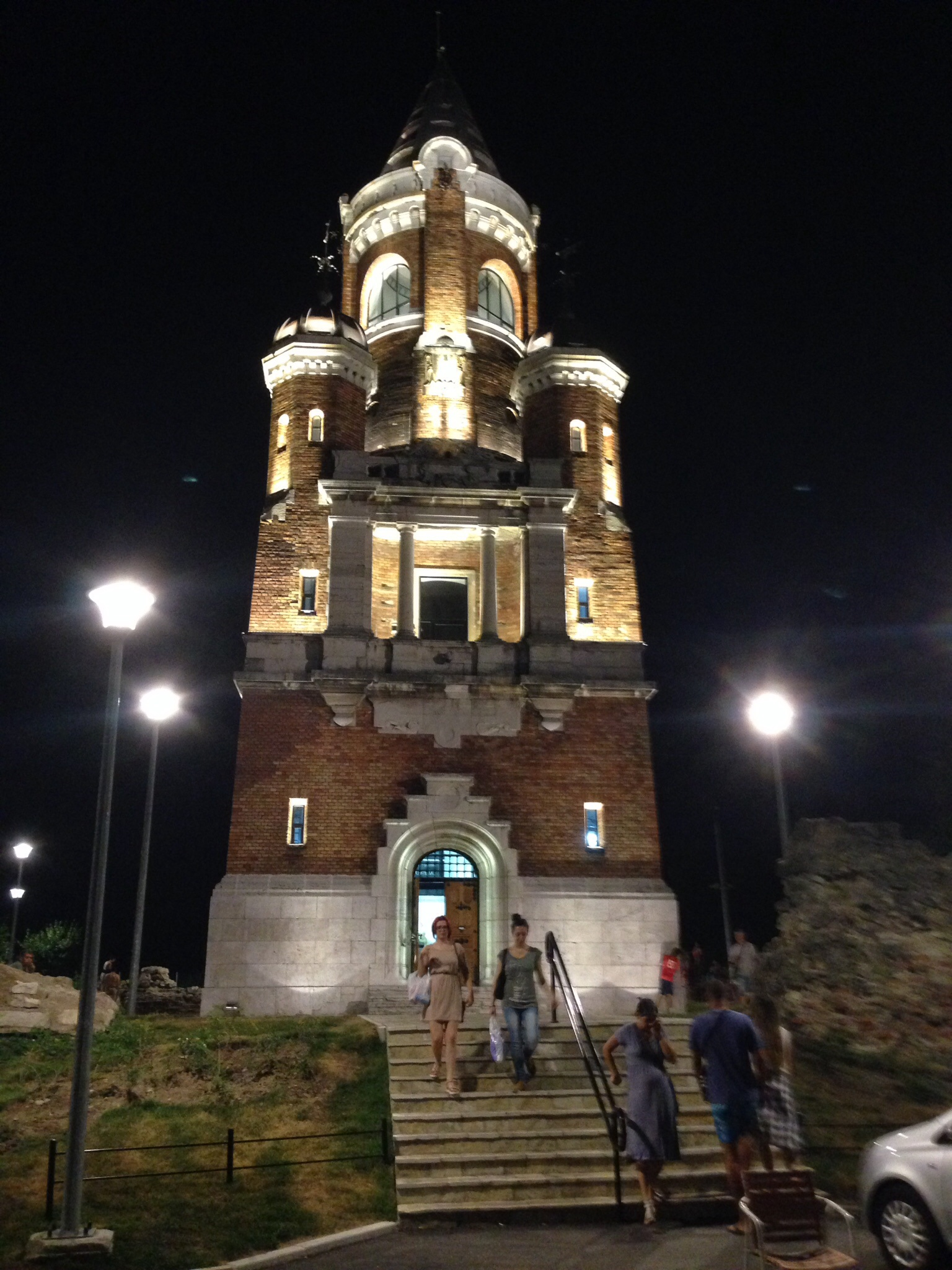
Reconstructed Gardoš Tower at night. The tower was built atop the fortress remains, some 4 centuries later

Gardoš Fortress, also known as the Zemun Fortress or the Citadela, is the oldest preserved part of Old Zemun and is considered one of Belgrade's best scenic viewpoints. The existing walls are originating from the 14th and the 15th century. The fortress was built as part of the Hungarian project of restoring or building fortresses on their southern borders, including today also ruined but surviving Kupinik and Slankamen, as a response to the incoming Ottoman invasion. Gardoš had a major role in 1456 Siege of Belgrade, when Hungarian forces headed by John Hunyadi repelled the Ottomans, and 1521 Siege of Belgrade, when the Ottomans, under the leadership of Sultan Suleiman the Magnificent conquered both Belgrade and Zemun. The entire garrison stationed at Gardoš Fortress, headed by the Šajkaši troops, was killed in the fighting and the fortress was the last stand of the entire battle. A 1608 miniature by Maximilian Prandstatter shows the castle fully preserved, complete with the roof. Representations of the Zemun skyline in the later 17th century, however, show only ruins.

The medieval Zemun fortress is preserved in the remains of the citadel, which was known as the Little Town. The citadel is built in the Gothic style. The square castle had four round towers, one on each side. The walls were made of broken stone pieces, with brick covering in limestone plaster. For the most part, only sections of the outer walls are preserved, so as three towers, up to 2 m (6 ft 7 in) high.

The fortress was never properly reconstructed since the 17th century. The elements, further military excursions and local population which took stones from the walls to build their own houses, damaged it further. The fortress was placed under the state protection in 1948. By the 21st century, the neglect of the fortress became obvious. The outer layer of the plaster completely fell off the brick walls, Because of the subsiding terrain, the southeast tower collapsed, threatening the houses below the fortress. Additionally, the illegal construction of the buildings nearby damaged the fortress further.

During the excavations in the late 2010s, digging the old trenches on the outer side of the southwest tower, two arched, opposing entries into the towers were discovered. They are located some 2.5 m (8 ft 2 in) below the present ground level of the modern Gardoš Tower, as the terrain was additionally filled to make foundations for it. During the archaeological surveys in 2012–2013, two excellently preserved Roman graves with numerous artifacts and intact skeletons were discovered. They are located between the eastern and southern tower and were dated to the 2nd or the 3rd century AD.

The reconstruction project was drafted in 2016. In March 2018 it was announced that the top plateau of the hill and the area surrounding the tower will be revitalized. Without public architectural design competition, the job was directly entrusted to architect Ksenija Bulatović by Milutin Folić, Belgrade's city architect, and Dejan Matić, president of Zemun municipality. The reconstructed area will cover 2,000 m^{2} (22,000 sq ft). The existing stairways which connect the tower with the city below will be expanded, while two panoramic elevators will be built, one to the Muhar (Square of Branko Radičević) and other to the Zemunski Kej, and the projected international pier on the Danube, which will be constructed in the future. Existing open air facilities, like the restaurant and an amphitheater, will be covered. The remaining open area is envisioned as a "summer stage, artistic colony, fitness zone". The project, which basically includes covering of the fortress plateau with concrete, was criticized by the public and other architects. Reconstruction began in March 2019.

City administration itself devised a reconstruction plan for the fortress walls. All four corner towers of the former fort will be refurbished. Three existing ones were revitalized, while the fourth, which was demolished, was reconstructed as much as possible. Existing towers protrude for 2 m (6 ft 7 in) above the remains of the fortress, while the fourth will be half of that height, so that the panoramic view on Zemun will be preserved. The reconstruction project of the fortress is work of architects and art conservators Aleksandra Dabižiċ, Ljiljana Konta and Rade Mrlješ. The works began in December 2018 and were finished in December 2019.

=== Tower ===
The major attraction in the neighborhood is the Kula Sibinjanin Janka (The tower of Janos Hunyadi) or the Millennium tower, also known as the Tower on the hill or simply the Gardoš tower. It was built and officially opened on 20 August 1896 to celebrate a thousand years of Hungarian settlement in the Pannonian plain. It was part of the massive construction effort which included buildings in Budapest as well as four millennium towers on four directions of the world. Being the southernmost city in then Hungary within the Austria-Hungary, the tower was built on the ruins of the medieval fortress on Gardoš hill which barely survived today (only angular towers and parts of the defending wall). The tower was built as a combination of various styles, mostly influenced by the Roman elements. Being a natural lookout, it was used by Zemun's firemen for decades. Today, the tower is better known after the Janos Hunyadi, who actually died in the old fortress four and a half centuries before the tower was built.

=== Churches ===
Saint Nicholas Church

Church dedicated to Saint Nicholas (Nikolajevska crkva) is located on the eastern slopes of the hill. It is actually devoted to the Translation of the Relics of Saint Nicholas from Myra to Bari, commemorating the 22 May 1087. Today is considered the oldest church on territory of urban Belgrade. It was mentioned for the first time in the 1578 diary of German theologian Stephan Gerlach who wrote that Serbs had a small church in the "village of Zemun", partially roofed with straw and wooden planks. A modest temple dedicated to Saint Nicholas was built from 1717 to 1731. Modern church was built from 1745, when the Austrian authorities granted a permit, to 1752. Modern clergy house, or parochial home, was built in the churchyard, on the location of the first Serbian school in this area. The school was founded in 1745 and one of the teachers was Joakim Vujić.

Baroque iconostasis from 1762 is the work of Dimitrije Bačević, while some of the interior ornaments are even older, from the 17th century. Wall paintings are not classical frescoes, the al secco technique was used instead - oil paints on wall plaster. The church was reconstructed from 2007 to 2020. The statics of the building had to be repaired, as the walls began to crack and the pond was created under the foundations. By 2010, when the conservatory works began, the concrete ring girder was built on the outside, the counterweights were placed on the inside and the object was dried.

The church holds pieces (čestice) of several valuable relics: Saint Andrew the First-Called, Saint Nicholas, Saint Petka, Saint Nectarios and Saint Stephen.

Saint Demetrius Church

From 1874 to 1876, the church dedicated to Demetrius of Thessaloniki was built in the Serbian Orthodox section of the Zemun cemetery. On the bequest given by his wife Marija, the church was built by the wealthy merchant Grigorije Hariš, originally from Novi Sad. Marija came from another affluent merchant family, the Zemun's family Pavlović whose family patron was the Saint Demetrius. After her death, Hariš and their sons, Dimitrije and Konstantin, built the church which is colloquially styled by the Zemun's resident as the Hariš Chapel. The church was completely reconstructed from 2017 to 2020.

Zemun Cemetery

Situated right next to the Millennium Tower on Gardoš Hill, Zemun's cemetery is unique in Balkan terms. The region is full of cemeteries respecting the dead of the three major religions, yet Zemun's graveyard brings the trio together. Orthodox Christians, Catholics, Muslims and Jews are buried throughout the grounds, and there are a number of solemn monuments included as well.

== Culture ==
There is a theater called "Teatar Gardoš" but it is located south of the neighborhood, on the Masaryk square in Donji Grad. The main cultural event is Leto na Gardošu (Summer in Gardoš), a series of mostly outdoors theatrical performances, held in July and August each year.

== Gallery ==
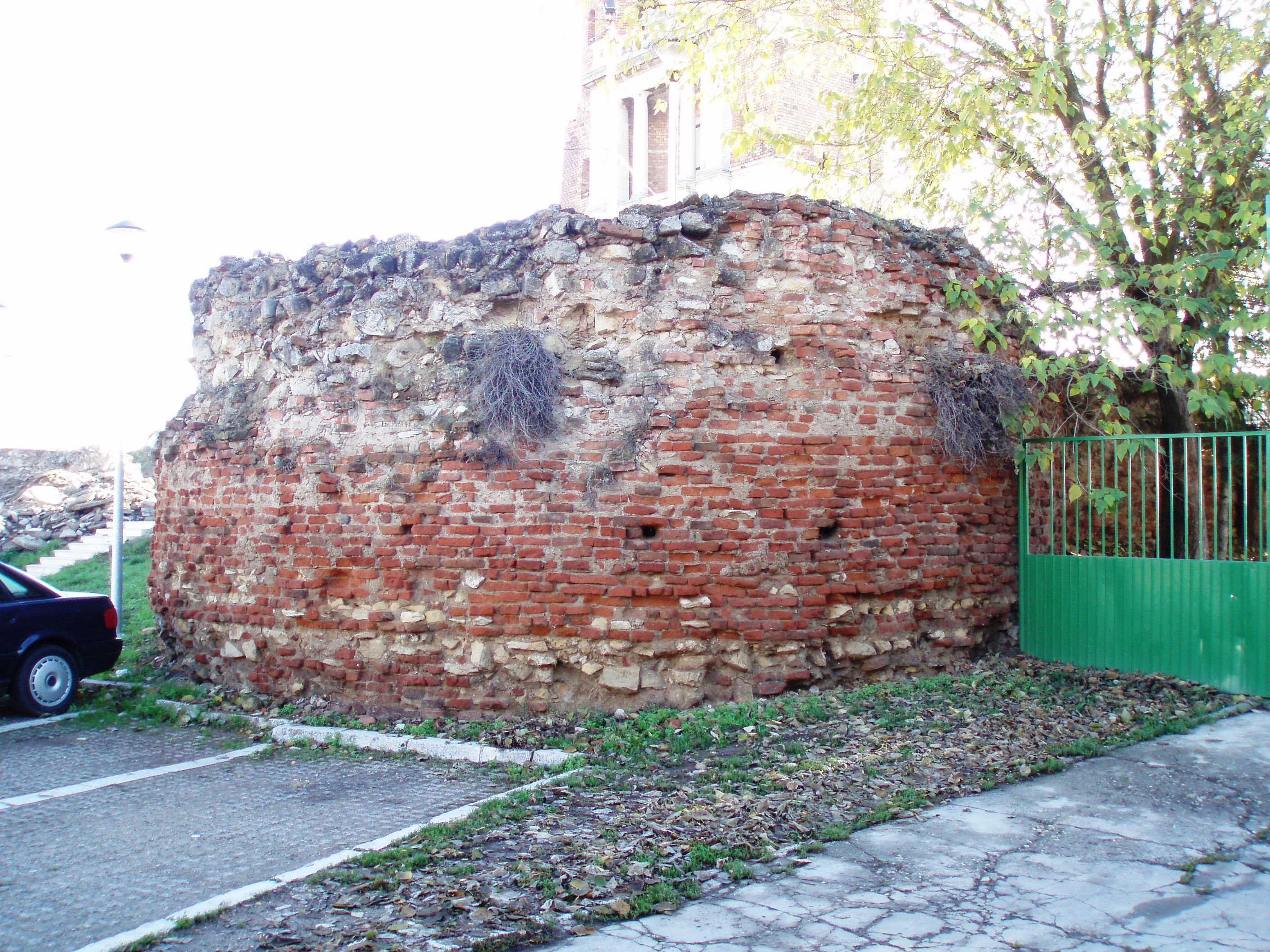
The remains of round towers on Gardoš

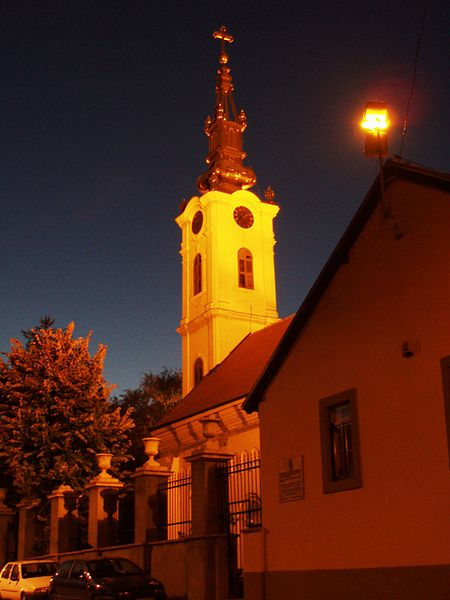
Nicholas Orthodox Church in Zemun

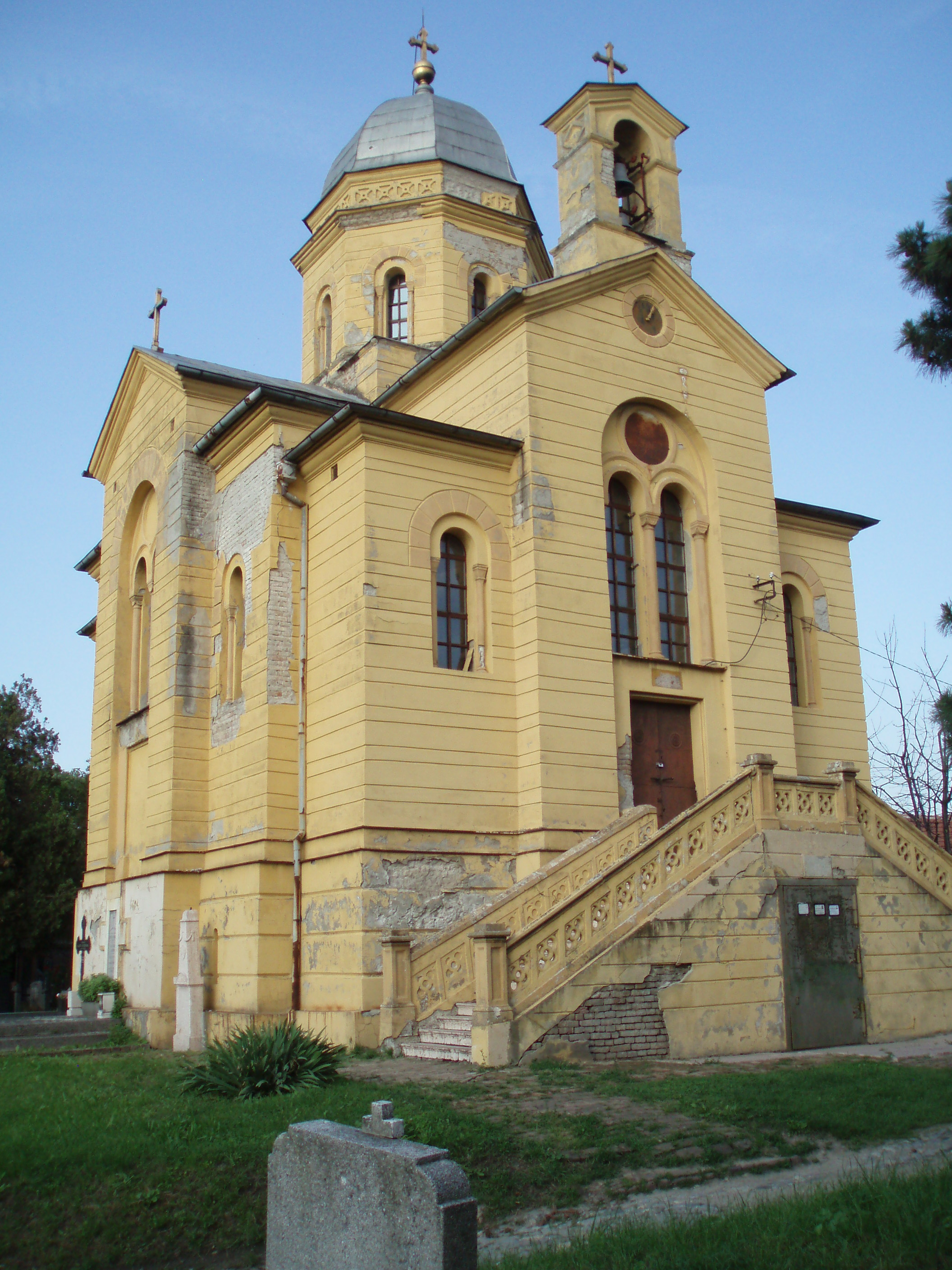
Haris Chapel in Zemun

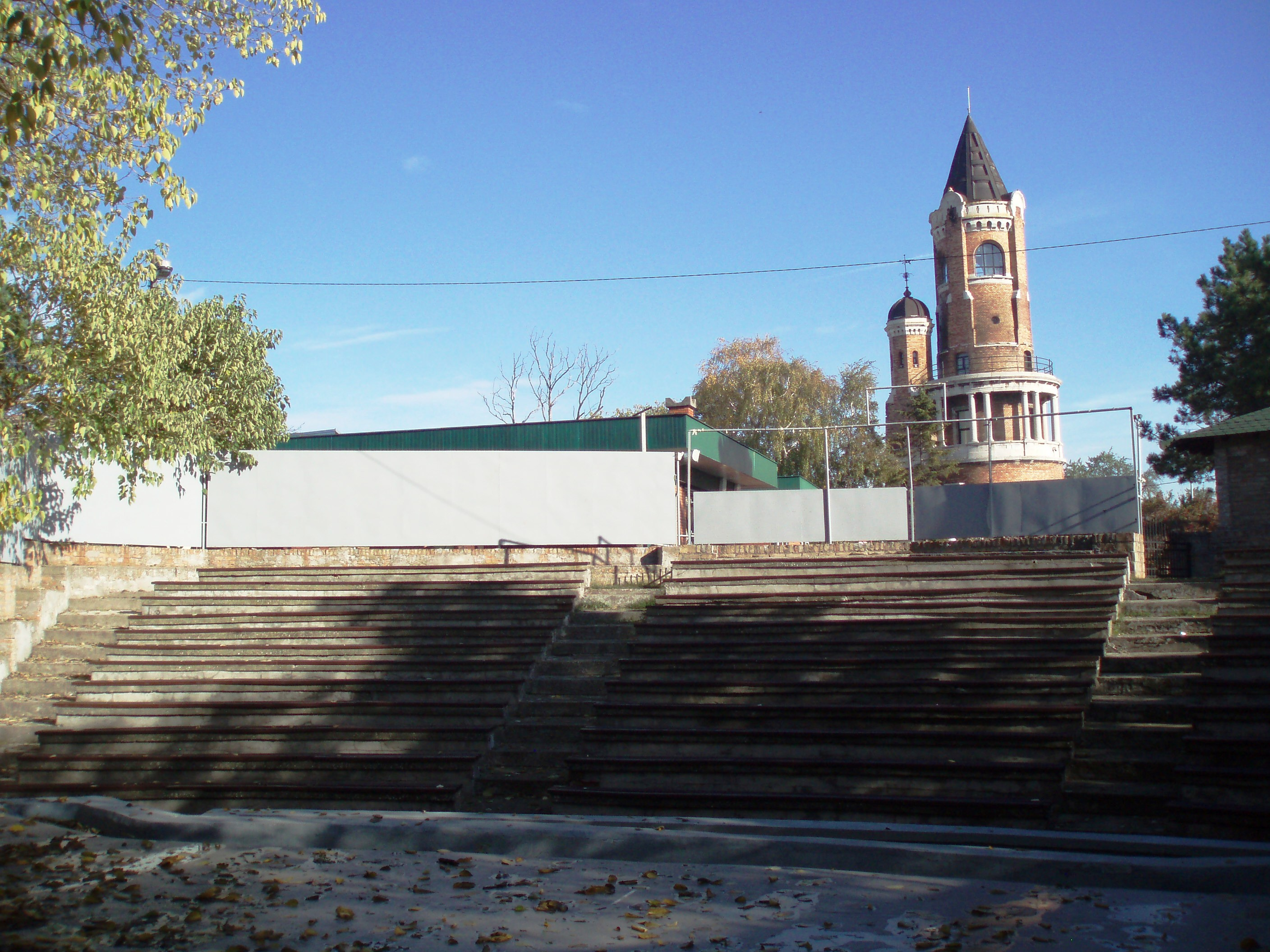
Summer Stage Amphitheatre on Gardoš

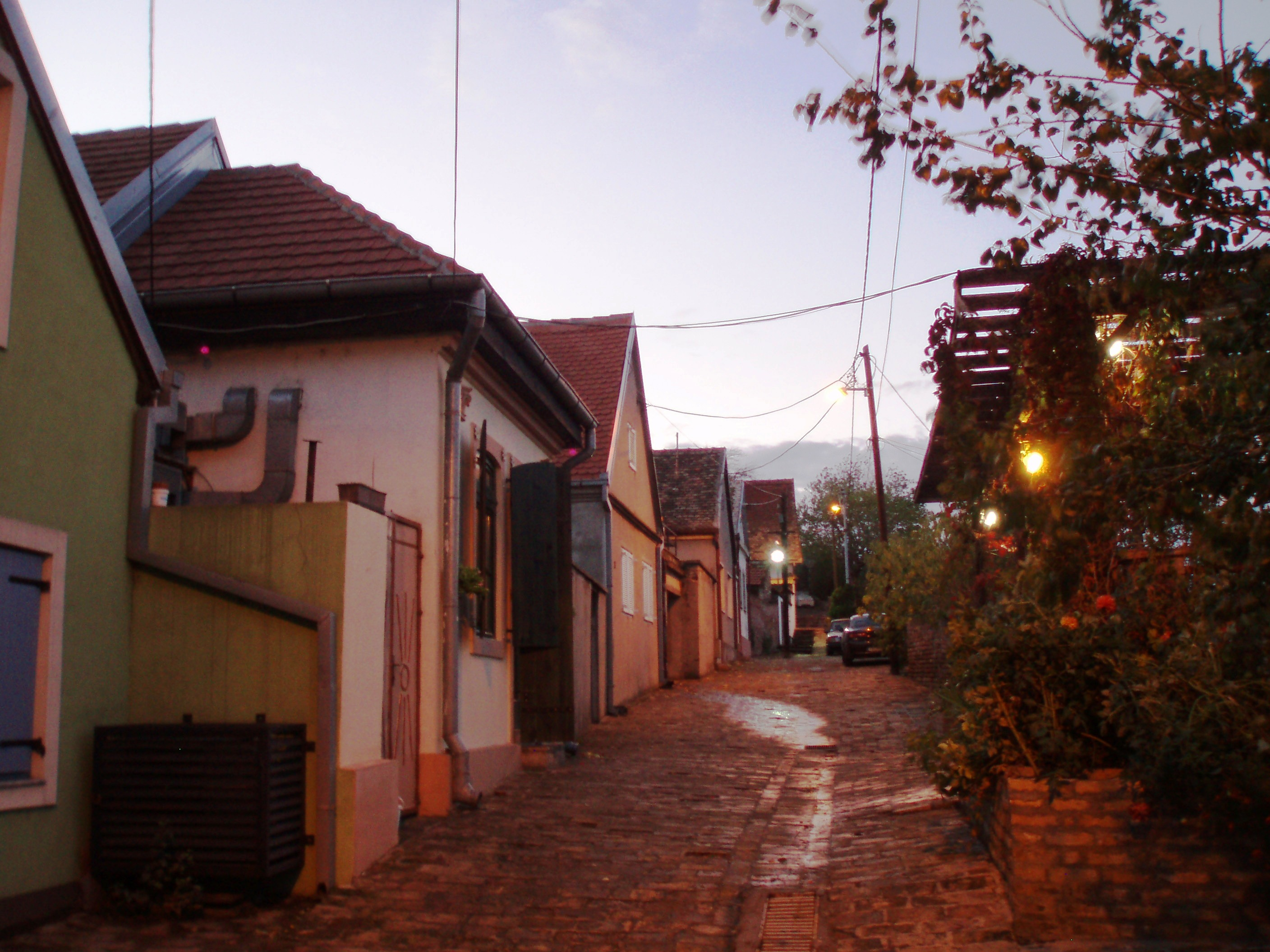
Čunarska street in Gardoš

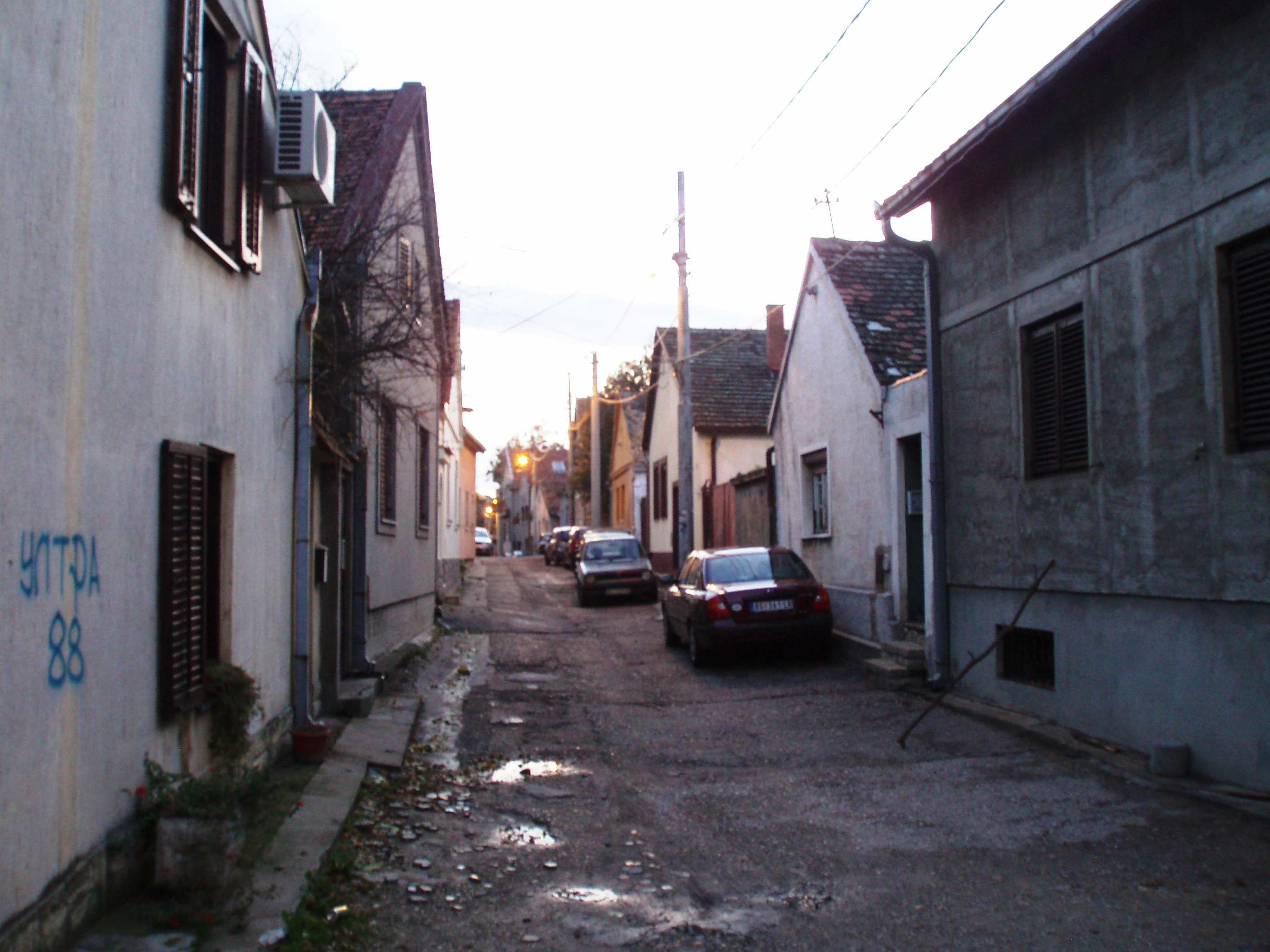
Gardoška street in Gardoš
