= Muhar =

Neighbourhood in Belgrade, Serbia

Coordinates: 44°50′43″N 20°24′30″E

Muhar (Serbian Cyrillic: Мухар) is an urban neighborhood of Belgrade, the capital of Serbia. It is located in the Belgrade municipality of Zemun.

== Location ==
Muhar is centered on the Branko Radičević Square. Geographically, it is a small, narrow valley between the hills (and neighborhoods) of Gardoš to the north and Ćukovac to the south, some of the oldest sections of Zemun. It forms a natural connection between the much larger Zemun neighborhoods of Donji Grad further south and Gornji Grad to the north.

== History ==
Muhar was named after Ivan Muhar (1867–1966), one of the most famous merchants in pre-World War II Zemun. Starting as an apprentice, he later opened his own store in the square and, as the business grew, later built a mansion (kuća Ivana Muhara) which is one of Zemun's main landmarks. Subsequently, the entire area around the square became known as Muhar. Today, the square officially bears the name of Branko Radičević, a 19th-century Serbian Romanticist poet.

== Characteristics ==
Muhar is one of Zemun's major crossroads. It marks the ending section of Glavna street, Zemun's main street. Through the Karamatina and Njegoševa streets on the east it is connected to the Zemunski Kej, while on the north-west, through the streets of Cara Dušana and Dobanovačka, it extends into the neighborhood of Gornji Grad. However, Muhar is too narrow for such traffic capacity and is a regular place of traffic congestion, especially in the rush hours.

Muhar is also the location of the Madlenianum Opera and Theatre. The entire area of Gardoš-Muhar-Ćukovac is known for its vast net of lagums, underground corridors. So far, 76 long corridors have been discovered, with many smaller ones. The longest is 96 metres (315 ft) long and the total explored length is 1,925 m (6,316 ft). They cover an area of 4,882 m^{2} (52,550 sq ft).
