= Galenika, Zemun =

Galenika, Zemun Галеника
- Urban neighbourhood
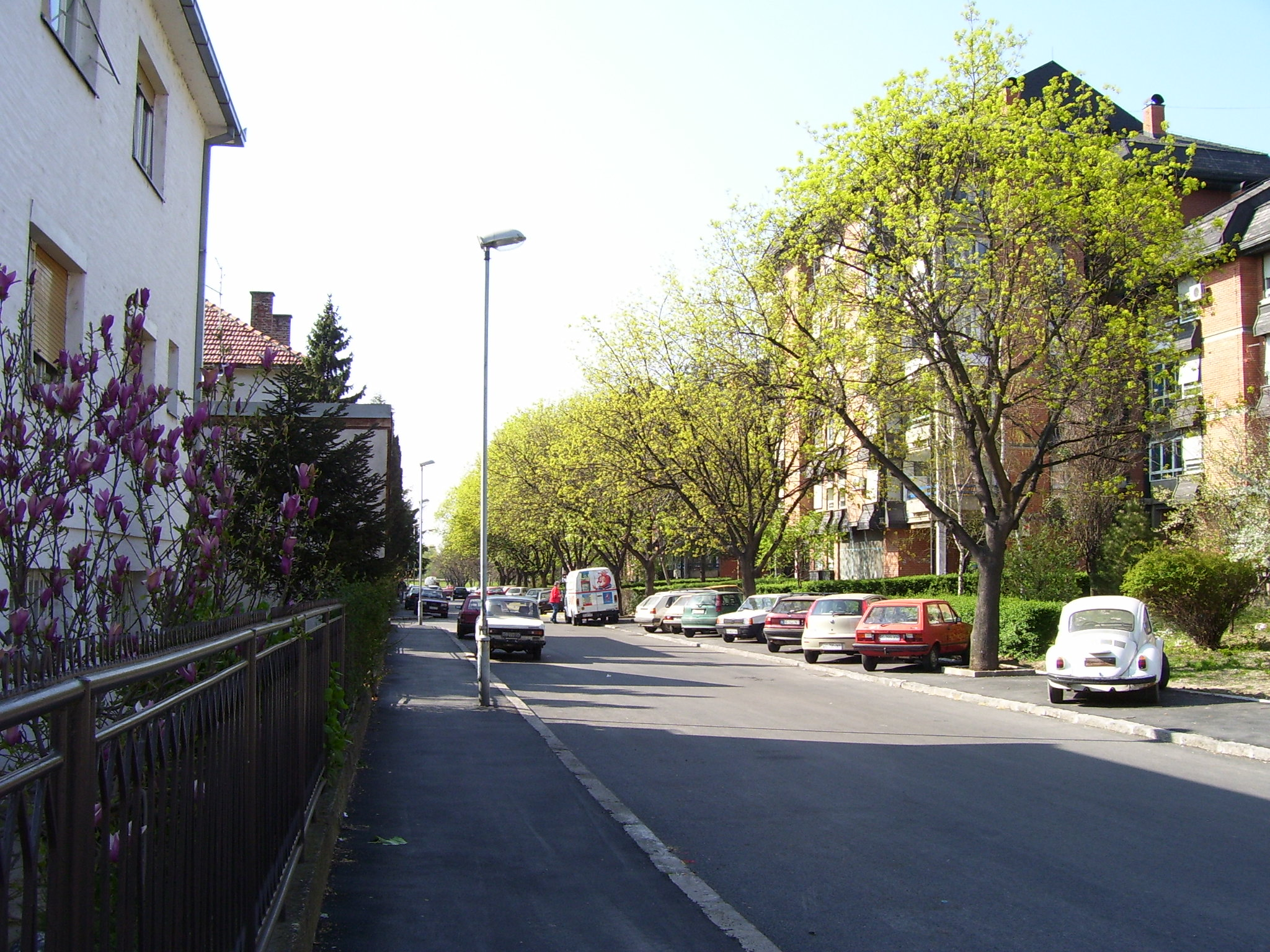
- A street in Galenika (2007).

- Location within Belgrade
- Coordinates: 44°51′29″N 20°22′09″E
- Country: Serbia
- Region: Belgrade
- Municipality: Zemun

Area
  - Total: 5.71 km^{2} (2.20 sq mi)

Population
  - Total: 12,533
  - Density: 2,190/km^{2} (5,680/sq mi)
- Time zone: UTC+1 (CET)
  - Summer (DST): UTC+2 (CEST)
- Area code: +381(0)11
- Car plates: BG

Galenika (Serbian Cyrillic: Галеника) or Nova Galenika (Serbian Cyrillic: Нова Галеника) is an urban neighborhood of Belgrade, the capital of Serbia. It is located in Belgrade's municipality of Zemun.

== Location ==
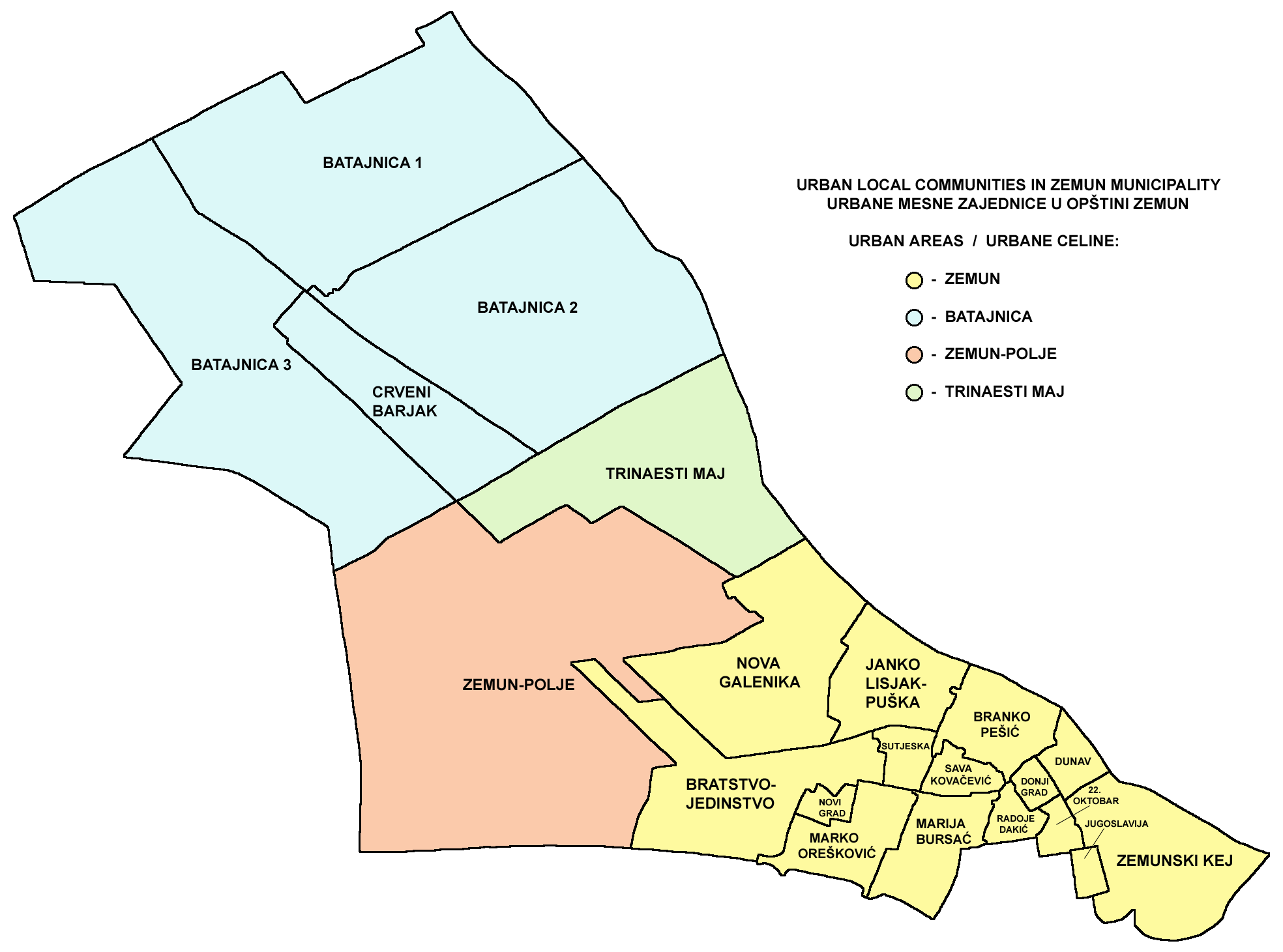
Map of Urban local communities in Zemun municipality

Nova Galenika is located in the north-western outskirts of Zemun. It is an elongated mixed residential-commercial-industrial neighborhood, mostly bound by the roads of Batajnički drum (Батајнички друм) and Novosadski put (Новосадски пут), borders the neighborhoods of Goveđi Brod to the north, Gornji Grad to the east, Zemun Bačka to the south-east, Altina to the south, while in the west, the industrial zone extends into the directions of Zemun Polje, Kamendin and Batajnica.

== Characteristics ==
The neighborhood consists of several parts, including the old Galenika section, the Nova (New) Galenika section, and the surrounding industrial and commercial areas. The neighborhood of Galenika originated in the 1960s as a separate neighborhood, outside of Zemun's urban center, as a settlement for the workers of the neighboring pharmaceutical factory Galenika A.B. Due to urban expansion, the neighborhood became an integral part of city during the 1980s.

Nova Galenika was designed by architects Ljiljana and Dragoljub Bakić.

The residential sections in Galenika have several parks with playgrounds, and numerous recreational sports terrains for basketball, football and volleyball. There is also walking path stretching around the neighborhood. Major retail chains have their supermarkets (Rodić, Maxi, ZIG, etc.) there. Galenika is well connected with the rest of Zemun and Belgrade with the public bus transportation lines: 84, 707, 17, 704, 706, 73. The population of the local community of Nova Galenika was 12,533 according to the 2002 census.

Galenika saw a recent rise in property prices, and projected future growth. This is a result of the construction of the new bridge across the Danube (Zemun-Borča Bridge), as the river is less than 250 meters away from the neighborhood, separated from it by the neighborhood of Goveđi Brod.

The last upswing in property prices was contributed to by construction of the first primary school in the neighborhood, which was finished in 2009.
