= Zemun Cemetery =

Cemetery in Belgrade, Serbia

Coordinates: 44.8485°N 20.4075°E

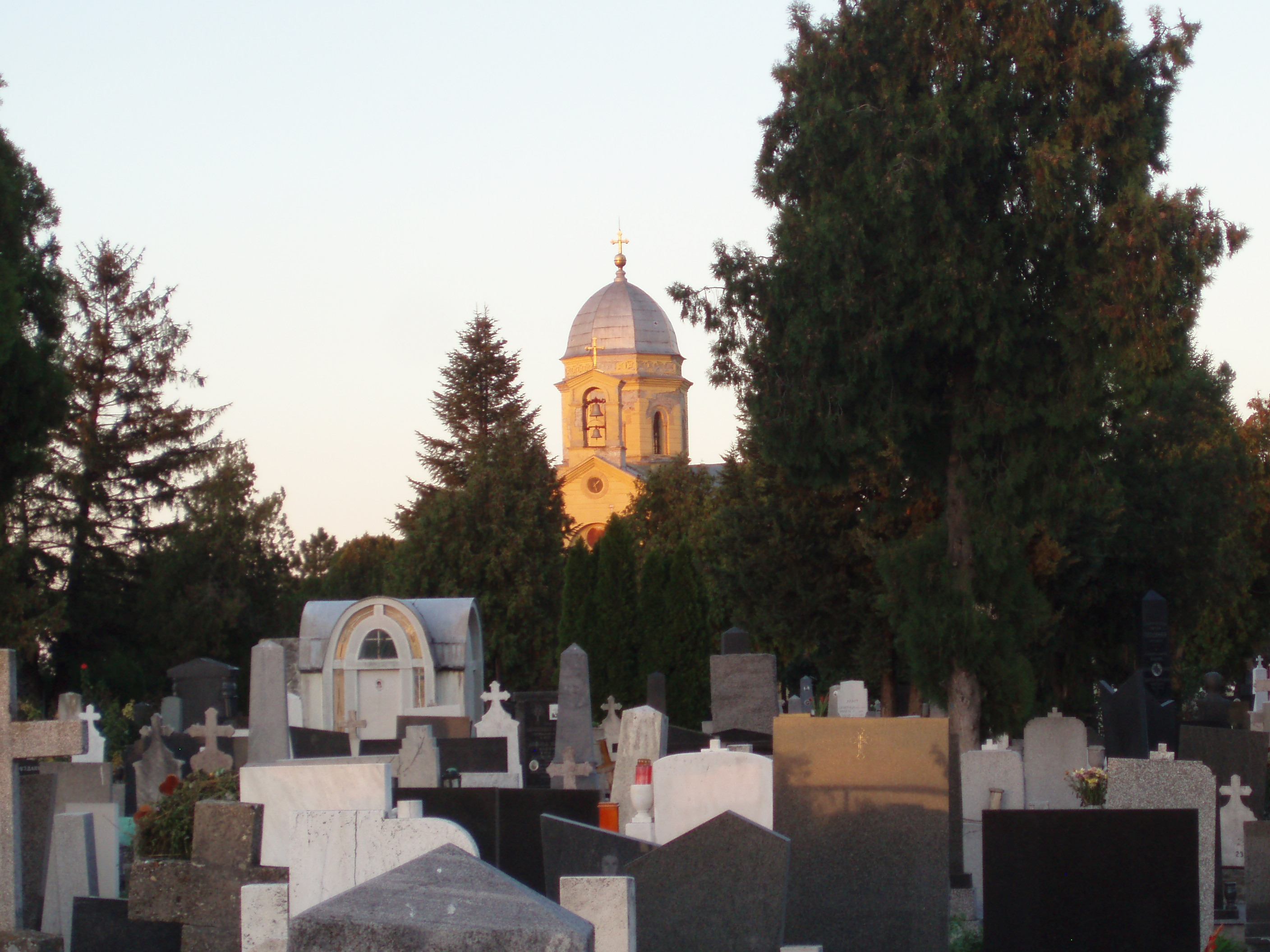
Zemun Cemetery

Zemun Cemetery is a public cemetery situated in Zemun on the Gardoš Hill. It is bounded by Cara Dušana Street, Nade Dimić Street, Sibinjanin Janka Street and Grobljanska Street, as well as with the staircase towards the Branka Radičevića Square, thus making the northwest boundary of the Old Core of Zemun. The cemetery is proclaimed the cultural monument.

== Introduction ==
Before 1740, the cemetery was located on the low slope of the Gardoš Hill. In the mid-18th century on the tableland of the Gardoš hill a complex was formed, consisting of two cemeteries, for three confessions: Orthodox, Catholic and Hebrew, which remained in function even nowadays. The defence wall with loopholes and bastions from 1841, saved as the cemetery enclosure, represents one of the last preserved parts of the city walls which used to surround entire Zemun.

== History ==
After conquering Zemun by the Habsburgs in 1717 and the Belgrade peace achieved in 1739, Zemun became the border town of the Habsburg monarchy. That was the reason for its transformation from the plain kasaba (a small town) to the town with modern urban designs. This development included determination of the unique site for the town cemetery, outside the very town, thus leaving the medieval custom of having the cemetery close to the worship places. Zemun cemetery on the Gardoš is located on the wooded plateau above the old part of the town and the Danube bank. It was established for the Catholic population, after the Turkish authorities had been expelled from Zemun and the town was incorporated into the Austrian Empire (1717). By the end of the 18th century, the old Orthodox graveyard was moved to the same plateau. Both cemeteries are today at the same place, including the Jewish which was established in that location after 1739. By the middle of the 20th century, the cemetery had filled up the present area and the authorities planned to open a new graveyard. However, that idea was realized after the Second World War and that new graveyard now serves a larger part of Belgrade. The use of the old cemetery has been continued, although the idea was to bury there only those people whose families owned burial places there. The problem is still acute, particularly because a great number of tombs where the eminent persons were buried and numerous memorials of historic and artistic value have to be preserved.

=== Old Muslim Cemetery ===
The old Muslim cemetery, established during the Turkish rule, was placed next to the Mosque on today's Great Square. The cemetery spread from the Mosque towards the Danube river, roughly enclosed by the today's streets Zmaj-Jovina and Gospodska Street. After the conquering of Zemun by the Habsburgs, this cemetery disappeared. Later, on the place of the Mosque the Church was built and on the very spot of the cemetery public buildings were constructed, mainly for the needs of the border city.

=== Old Orthodox Cemetery ===
This cemetery, also established during the Turkish rule, was located on the slope of the Gardoš Hill, in the immediate vicinity of Nikolajevska Church. It spread from the church yard uphill, along the today's even-numbered side of the Sinđelićeva Street. With the first extensions of the new cemetery on Gardoš, the area on this cemetery was parcelled and sold, from the base of Gardoš uphill. Mostly residential houses are nowadays located on its area outside the churchyard.

== Today ==
=== Orthodox Cemetery ===
In the Orthodox of the cemetery there are: the protected endowment church of the St. Demetrious, of the merchant family Petrović-Hariš (1876), the chapel of Spirta family (around 1911), The monument to the fallen and dead Serbian soldiers 1914–1918 (1928), the important graves of the former Greek and Tzintzari colony, graves of Russian refugees (since 1920), of the first pilots of Yugoslav passenger planes, businessmen, philanthropists, priests, scientists, writers, artists and others, with a large number of sculptures on them, the works of the eminent sculptors: Đorđe Jovanović, Dragomir Arambašić, Vojin Bakić, Petar Palavičini, Тоma Rosandić, Stevan Bondarov, Periša Milić and others. The churchyard also bears a memorial to the citizens of Zemun, who died in 1943 in the Croatian concentration camp Stara Gradiška.

=== Catholic Cemetery ===
The Catholic cemetery keeps: a chapel from 1763 with several memorial plaques on its façade, a stylized chapel from 1909 of the Treščik family of pharmacists, a memorial to the warriors 1914–1918, a Neo–Gothic crucifixion in metal INRI, the graveyard of the nuns who worked in hospitals (since 1887) and schools (since 1928), memorial tombstones of merchant families: Mozer, Gnus, Štrajher, Albreht, Kulundžić, Filipović; the families of builders and architects: Jenč, Kapus, Cimerman, Katinčić, Kraus; of the deacons and parish priests from Lower Srem: a writer Vilim Korajac (1899), Маato Štrac (1911), Dr. Alojzije Vincetić (1930), Ivan Šulc (1946); a writer and a lawyer Dr. Živko Bertić, a writer prof. Kazimir Supičić (1938), navigators from DDSG, and others. In one part of the cemetery there is a common memorial to the Victims of the Fascist Terror, where a large number of the prisoners from the fascist camp at the Old Belgrade Fairgrounds (Staro sajmište), on the left bank of the Sava River.

=== Jewish Cemetery ===
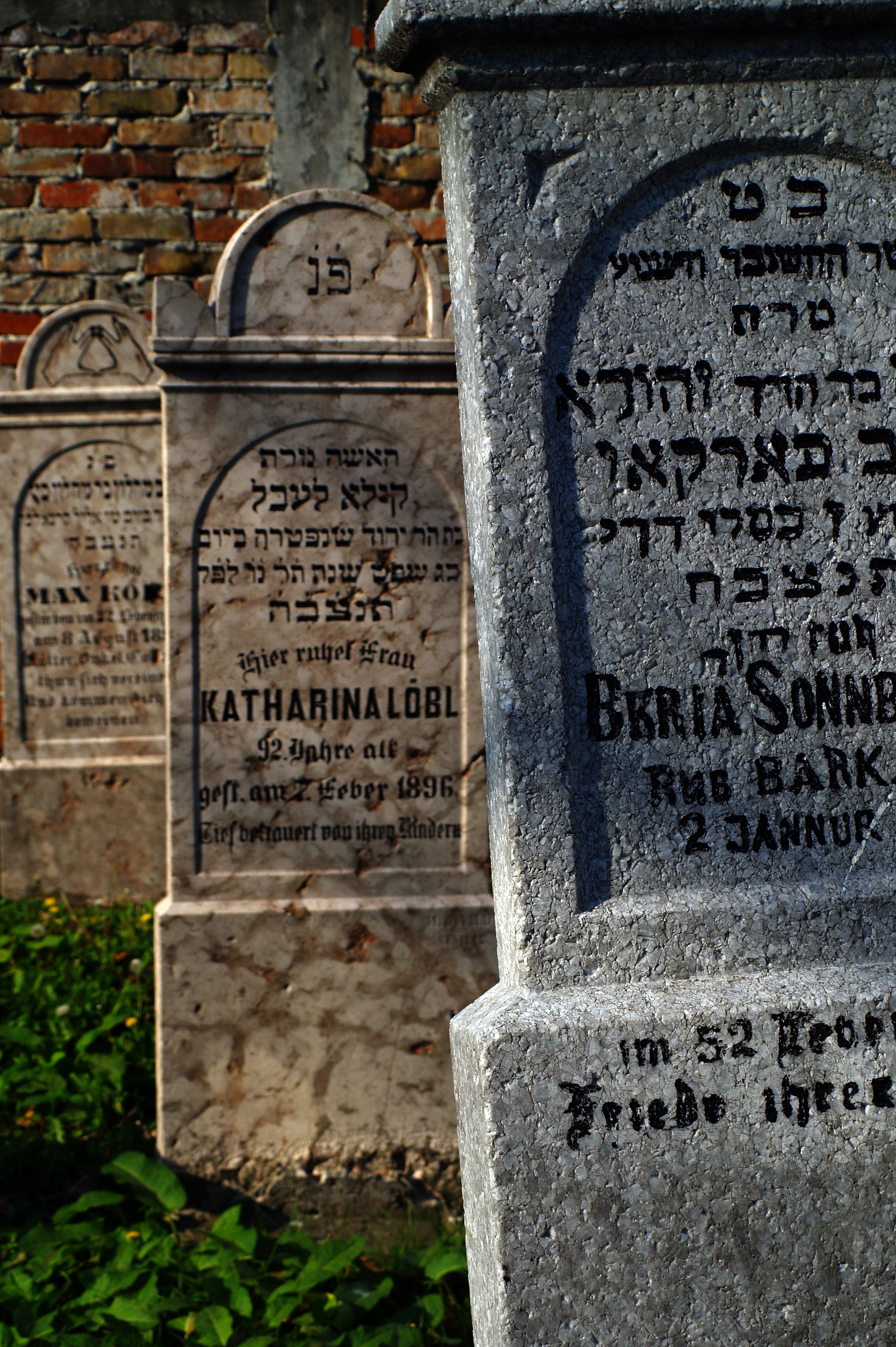
Headstones in the Jewish Cemetery

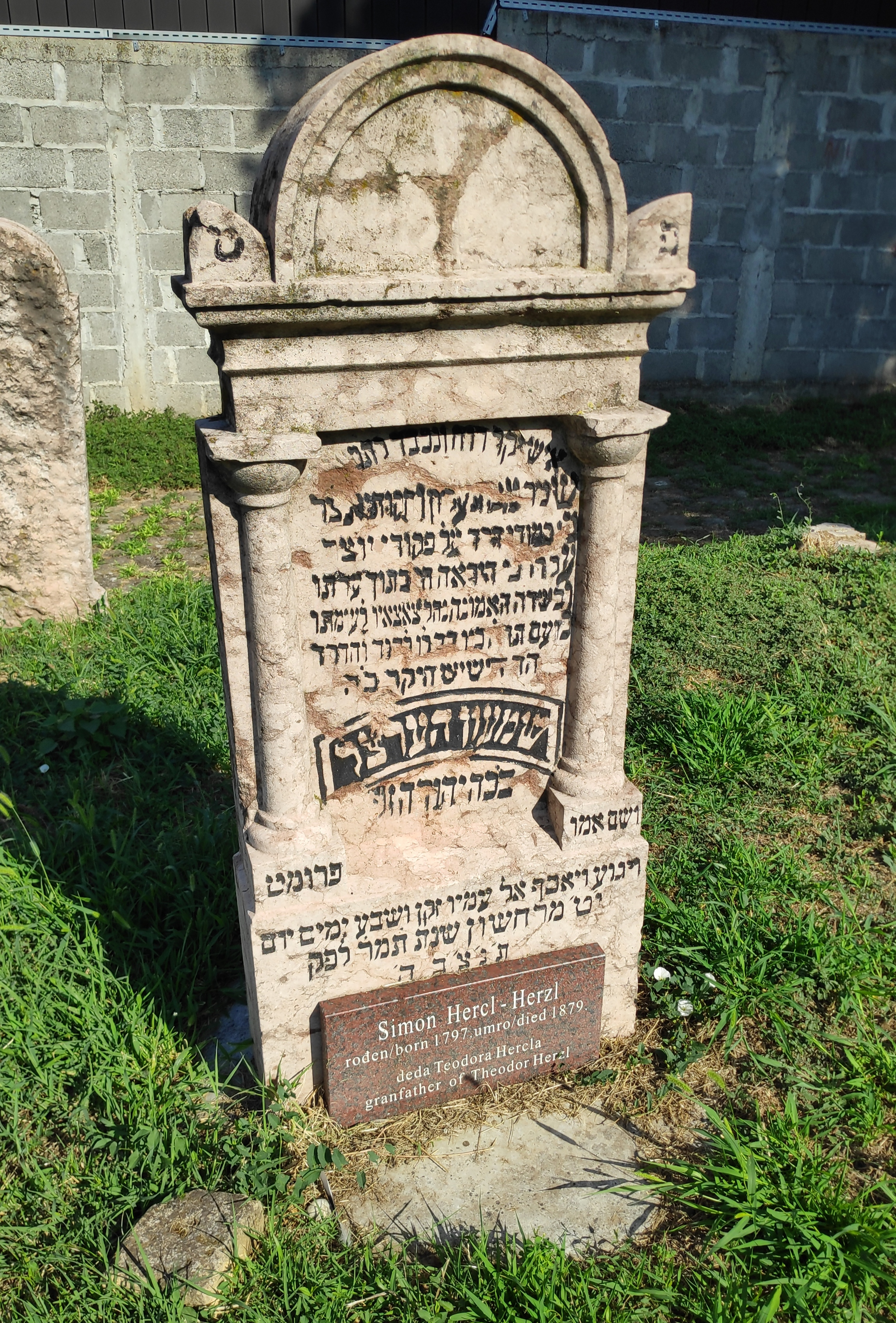
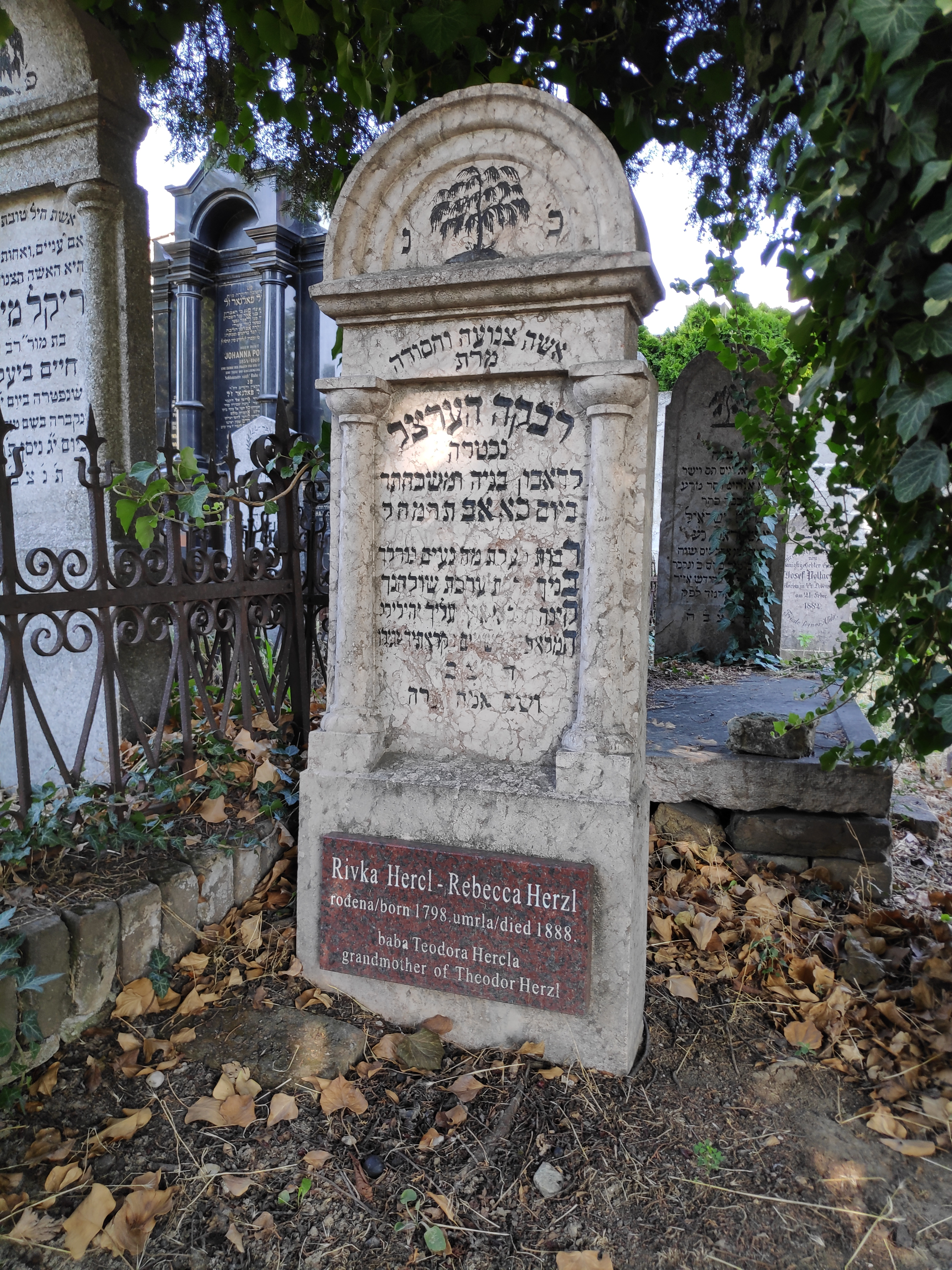
Graves of Theodor Herzl grandparents Simon (1797–1879) and Rivka Herzl (1798–1888)

The Jewish cemetery, one of the oldest in Serbia, has been the burial place since the arrival of Jews in the Austrian Zemun (1739) till the present time. The stone memorials have characteristic shapes, from votive plates to modern and representative, such as the tombstone to businessman Gabriel Polgar (1915). They bear family names such as: Brandajs, Levi, Herzl, Salamon, Koen, Goldštajn, Hiršl, Hajm, Šer, Veksler, etc. Оtо Bihali-Merin, a writer and a publicist was buried there in 1993, his brother Pavle in 1941, an industrialist Маavro Binder in 1927, Моses Albahari in 1897 and a medical doctor Isac Isarah in 1912. A slab with the inscription: To the Victims of Fascism 1941–1945, stands in a prominent place. It commemorates the 540 members of the Јеwish community in Zemun who lost their lives in the concentration camps at Јаsenovac and Stara Gradiška. A large number of tombstones of different stylistic and iconographic features have crucial significance of the chronological study of the cultural development of this part of the town, in the period of two centuries. It is beyond dispute that the graves of eminent personalities and the tombstones should be protected, particularly the graves of the families with no descendants. The Cultural Heritage Protection Institute of the City of Belgrade had compiled a Catalogue of important graves and grave memorials and submitted it to the City, the Borough and the Cemetery authorities. Some things have already been done in the meantime, such as the reconstruction of the devastated Spirta Chapel in 2007. Constant reconstruction and restoration of the tombs is necessary. The danger of the landslides and mines dug up underneath during the Austrian and Austro-Hungarian rule, and which are no longer used for their initial purpose, increase the terrain instability.

== See also ==
- Svetozar Ivačković

== Literature ==
- Petar St. Marković, Zemun from the oldest times till today, The Printing house of Jova Karamata, Zemun, 1896.
- Gojko Desnica, Zemun and the First Serbian Uprising (1804–1813), Literary Club „Zemun“, Zemun, 1975.
- D. Bukvić, "The Problem Of Zemun resting place", Politika, 28 October 2012., ISSN 0350-4395
- Željko Škalamera, "The Old Core of Zemun", volume 5, The Cultural Heritage Protection Institute of the City of Belgrade, 1966.
