= Branko Pešić =

Yugoslav and Serbian politician (1922-1986)

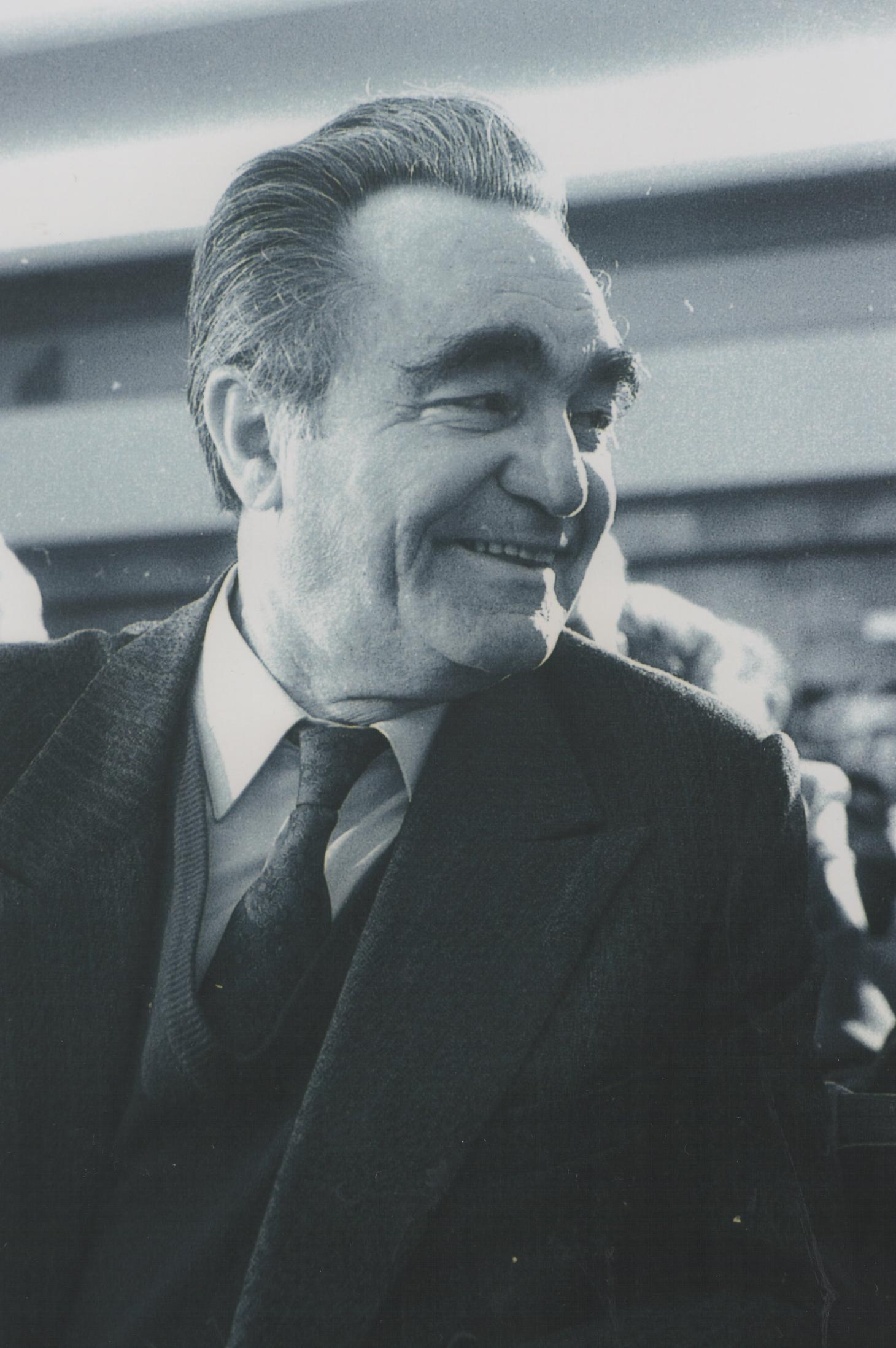
- Pešić in 1985

60th Mayor of Belgrade
- In office 15 April 1965 – May 1974
- Preceded by: Milijan Neoričić
- Succeeded by: Živorad Kovačević

Personal details
- Born: 1 October 1922 Zemun, Kingdom of Serbs, Croats and Slovenes
- Died: 4 February 1986 (aged 63) Zemun, SR Serbia, SFR Yugoslavia
- Resting place: Zemun Cemetery
- Party: League of Communists of Yugoslavia
- Education: University of Belgrade Faculty of Law
- Profession: Politician

Branko Pešić (Serbian Cyrillic: Бранко Пешић, pronounced [brâːŋko pěʃitɕ]; 1 October 1922 – 4 February 1986) was a Serbian politician in SFR Yugoslavia.

Pešić was a member of the Yugoslav Partisans during the Second World War and was the Mayor of Belgrade from 1965 to 1974. He is widely remembered as one of the most popular Belgrade mayors as his decade-long tenure saw the construction and completion of many important projects.

== Career ==
Pešić was born on 1 October 1922 in Zemun to father Dimitrije "Mita" (1900–1976) and mother Anka (1897–1983). He completed elementary school in Zemun and high school at the Zemun Gymnasium. After that he studied law at the University of Belgrade. As a student of the Zemun Gymnasium, he joined the youth revolutionary movement and became a member of the League of Communist Youth of Yugoslavia (SKOJ).

After the invasion and occupation of the Kingdom of Yugoslavia in 1941, he left his studies and joined the anti-fascist movement in Yugoslavia. He first worked politically in occupied Zemun and its surroundings where he took part in preparing and organizing sabotages and diversions against the occupying forces. He later joined the Yugoslav Partisans where he entered into Bosnia as a member of the Vojvodina Brigades. During the war he was a political commissar and battalion commander. He became a member of the Communist Party of Yugoslavia (KPJ) in 1942.

After the end of the war, he graduated from the Đuro Đaković Political School and had various political functions. He was a member and secretary of the Committee of the Communist Party of Serbia for Zemun, the SKOJ Committee secretary for Zemun and Belgrade, member and secretary of the City Committee for the League of Communists of Serbia and the president of the Socialist Alliance of Working People of Yugoslavia City Council for Belgrade.

He was also a member of the Bureau of the Central Committee of the People's Youth of Serbia, the president of the Zemun City Municipality Assembly from 1955 to 1958, an instructor in the Central Committee of the League of Communists of Serbia, secretary for commodity traffic in the Executive Council of the Socialist Republic of Serbia and the Vice-President of the Presidency of SR Serbia. He was also President of the Assembly of SR Serbia from 1982 to 1984.

He was chosen as a Member of Parliament of the Republic Assembly of SR Serbia and the SFR Yugoslavia Assembly numerous times. He was chosen as a member of the Central Committee of the League of Communists of Serbia at the Fourth and Fifth Congresses of the party.

He also served as president of the Football Association of Yugoslavia from 1953–1955 and 1956–1957.

=== As mayor ===
Pešić was Mayor of Belgrade from 1965 to 1974 and was one of the most popular mayors of Belgrade. During his tenure, many important buildings were built such as the Mostar interchange, Gazela Bridge, Terazije Tunnel and the Beograđanka among others. During his tenure, the ambitious plan of lowering Belgrade onto its surrounding rivers (Belgrade on the Sava) was introduced along with initiating the Belgrade railway junction and the Belgrade Metro. For a time, his economic advisor was Slobodan Milošević after his graduation from university in 1966. Pešić's tenure as mayor is often referred to as the golden age of Belgrade for which he was nicknamed the Pericles from Zemun.

== Personal life ==
Pešić married twice. From his first marriage with professor Zagorka Golubović he had a daughter named Branislava and from his second marriage with Desanka Desa Pešić he had a son Lazar and a daughter Sofija.

== Death and legacy ==
During his lifetime, he was awarded many Yugoslav awards including the Commemorative Medal of the Partisans of 1941 among others. He was awarded the Order of the Hero of Socialist Labour on 24 January 1986.

Pešić died due to cancer on 4 February 1986 and is interred in a family plot in the Zemun Cemetery.

A street in Zemun, near his family home, bears his name. The elementary school in Zemun has also been named after him.
