= House at 10 Cara Dušana Street =

Oldest surviving building in Belgrade, Serbia

Coordinates: 44.824932°N 20.456953°E

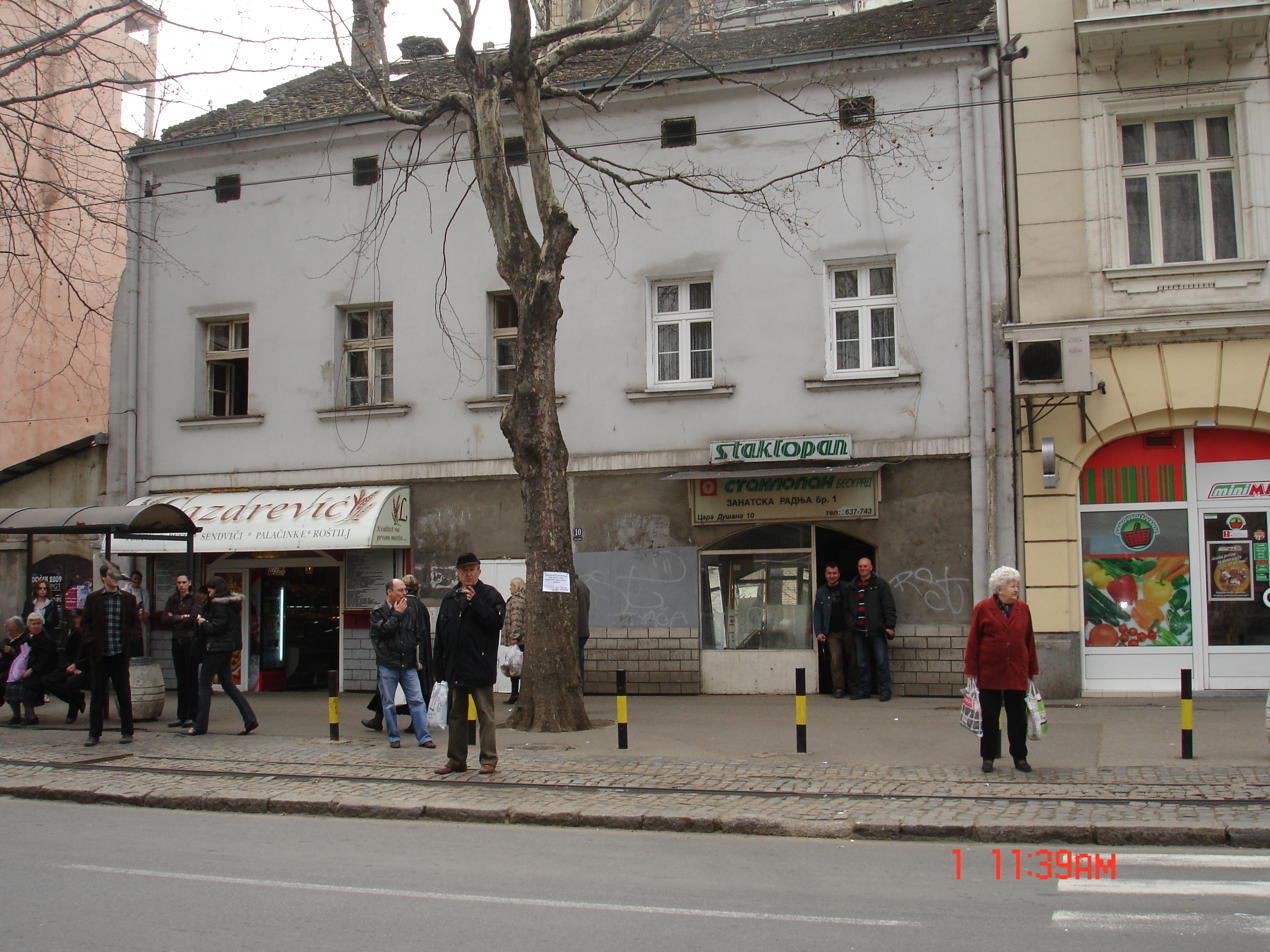
The house at 10 Cara Dušana Street

House at 10 Cara Dušana Street (Serbian: Кућа у Улици Цара Душана broj 10, romanized: Kuća u Ulici Cara Dušana broj 10) was built from 1724 to 1727 and is the oldest surviving building in Belgrade, the capital of Serbia. The house is located in the neighborhood of Dorćol, in the municipality of Stari Grad, and was declared a cultural monument in 1987.

== History ==
The building is one of the first finished edifices built during the Austrian occupation of Northern Serbia 1718-39. The construction began in 1724 and was finished in 1727. It was projected by the Swiss architect Nicolas Doxat, who was a colonel in the Austrian army at the time. Doxat devised the regulation plan for the entire section of Belgrade, especially the reconstruction of the Belgrade Fortress. In 1738 he was accused of treason and was executed under the walls of the fortress.

The house was built for the saddler Elias Fleischmann. He was a respected man in the community and a councilor in the Belgrade's municipal council. Apart from living in it, he used the building as a workshop, too. After 1740, when Austrians withdrew and the Ottomans regained the control over Belgrade, the house remained settled and, in one way or another, it has been used as a workshop or a shop ever since it was built until today. It was damaged during the Siege of Belgrade in 1789, when Austrians reclaimed Belgrade, but it was repaired later. In the late 19th century the building was thoroughly reconstructed: the roof was changed and lowered while the decorations on the façade were changed and adapted more to the present styles in architecture.

After Austria lost the Austro-Turkish War of 1737–1739, the northern Serbia, including Belgrade, was returned to the Turks. One of the provisions of the 1739 Treaty of Belgrade stated that Austria had to demolish all the fortifications and military and civilian buildings it has constructed during the occupation. Many Baroque buildings were demolished. However, Austria didn't demolish the buildings outside of the fortress walls. That way, the house survived.

The house was the second in a row of seven identical houses in a "standard row" on the right side of the street which, at the time, was considered the "German part of the town". Two more houses survived until the 1930s when they were demolished and only the house at number 10 remained.

Until 1950, the ground level was a grocery shop while the textile workshop "Narodni Heroj Anđа Ranković" was located in the cellar. Named after the late wife of Aleksandar Ranković, one of the most powerful Communist politicians after 1945, the shop developed into "Beko", formerly one of the largest clothing factories in Serbia. Until the mid-2000s, the bakery was located in the building. It was the first bakery in former Yugoslavia which was open 24/7. A new, modern bakery-pizzeria was opened in 2008.

== Characteristics ==
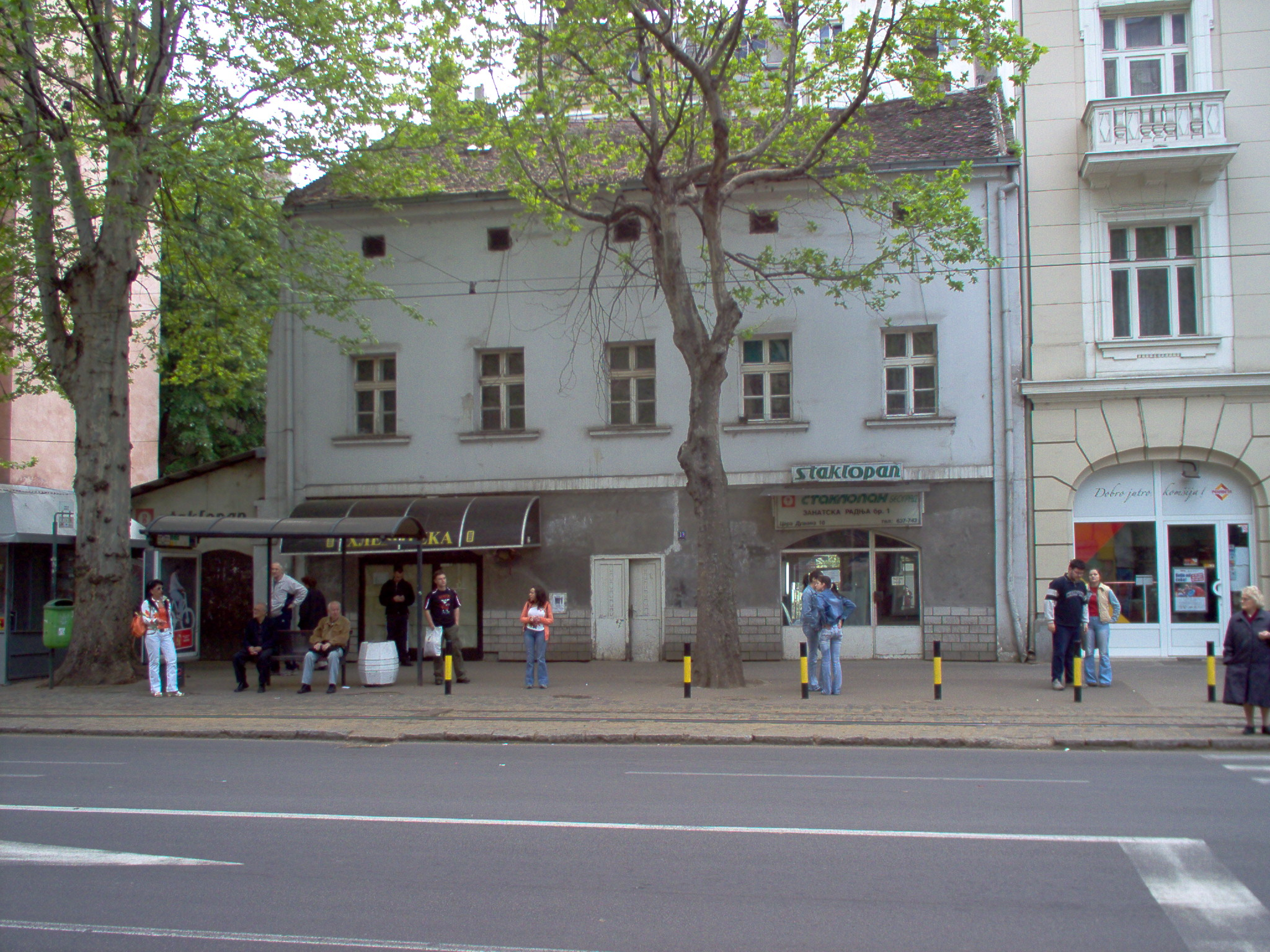
View from across the street

The building's façade was constructed in the Baroque manner of the day, which Doxat wanted to apply in the entire German section of Belgrade and is a typical example of a residential-business urban house, common in the area of the Habsburg monarchy in the Danube region in the 18th century. The house has a cellar, ground floor and upper floor. Its original façade was divided by a simple horizontal cornice above the ground floor, by side pilasters on the corners and, probably, a profiled roof cornice. The portals were framed in profiled stone frames. All seven original houses were connected via cellars and the remaining cellar stretches below the entire building. The lowest cellar point is 4 m (13 ft) underground and the Danube's water level is some 5 m (16 ft) below the cellar.

== Underground ==
Stories about the lagums, underground corridors which connect the house with the fortress have been circulating for a long time and one of the alleged reasons for the execution of Doxat was to keep the vast underground network of corridors a secret.

The story was brought to the spotlight again in 1963. Mrs. Katarina Bastl, a longtime tenant of the house, gave an interview to the architectural "Izgradnja" magazine. She claimed that in the spring of 1941, soon after Germany occupied Yugoslavia, a group of Wehrmacht officers arrived in the limousine and entered the cellar. In the next weeks, the tenants were not allowed to enter the cellar and there was a constant noise as the Germans continuously hammered and drilled something below the building. The story prompted many people, including speleologists, to explore the cellar, but all they could find was an inundated cellar, divided by the parting walls and full of thick watery sludge. The walls were obviously much younger than the house itself. In 2010 journalists entered the cellar. The stone staircase leads down for some 30 m (98 ft), before the deep sludge prevents the further passing. Whether there are corridors further from that point and where they lead is still unknown.

== Today ==
As of 2017, it is the oldest building of Belgrade and the only residential house from the first half of the 18th century preserved in the urban structure of Belgrade outside the complex of the Fortress.

The city administration prepared a report in 2010, which envisioned the adaptation of the building into the museum, but as of 2017 it didn't materialize.

== See also ==
- White Bear Tavern, even older house in the municipality of Zemun
