= Kalvarija, Zemun =

Urban neighborhood of Belgrade, Serbia

Coordinates: 44°50′27″N 20°23′54″E

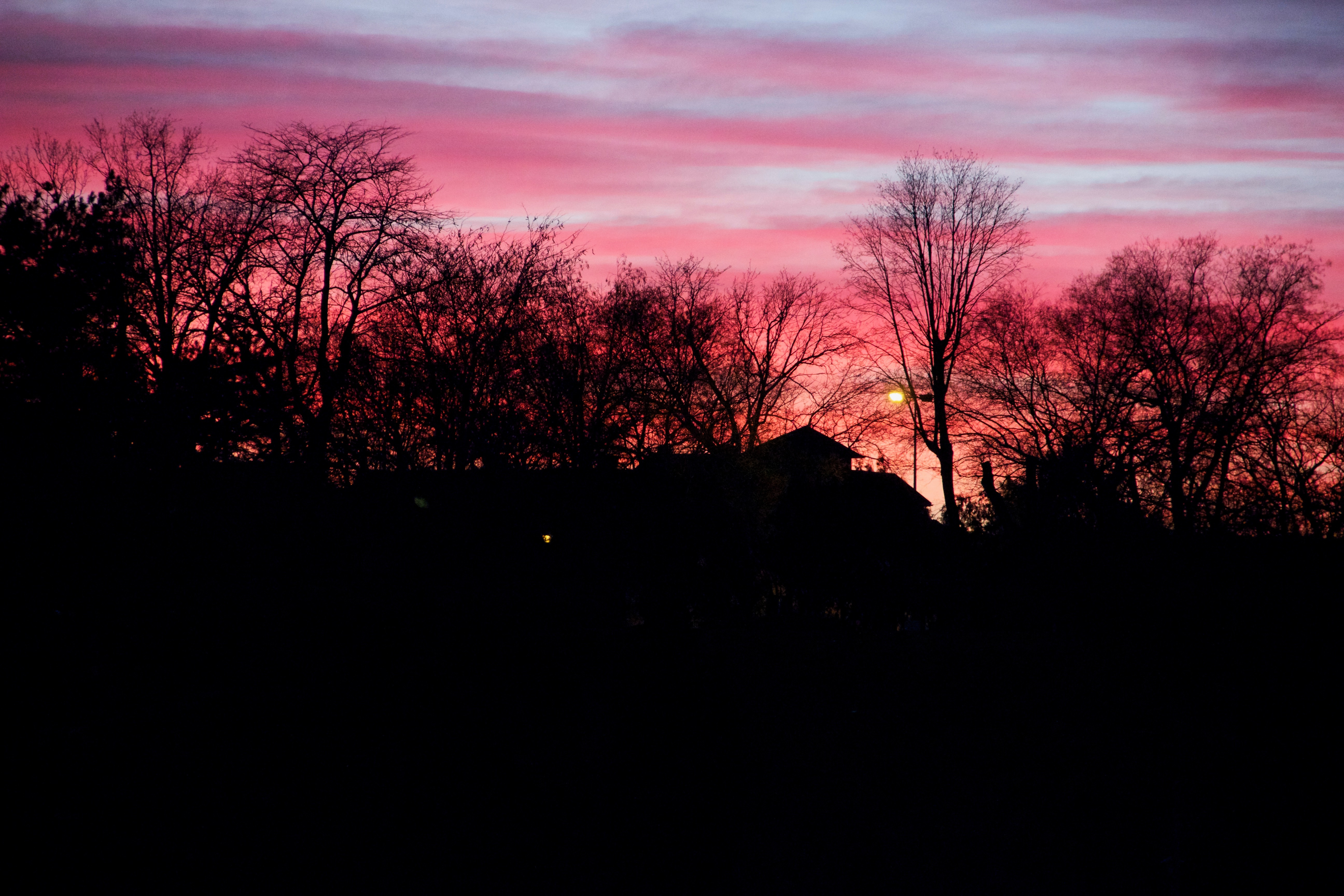
Sunset over Kalvarija

Kalvarija, also formerly known as Marija Bursać (Serbian: Калварија or Марија Бурсаћ) is an urban neighborhood of Belgrade, the capital of Serbia. It is located in Belgrade's municipality of Zemun.

== Location ==
Kalvarija is located southwest of downtown Zemun. It borders the neighborhoods of Sava Kovačević on the north, Železnička Kolonija on the west, the northernmost extension of Bežanijska Kosa on the south and Tošin Bunar on the east and southeast.

== Characteristics ==
Historical population
Year	Pop.	±%
1981	9,168	—
1991	10,540	+15.0%
2002	11,002	+4.4%

In the 18th and 19th century, during the existence of Kontumac, quarantine complex in Zemun at the Austrian-Turkish border, those who would die in quarantine were buried in Kalvarija, at the so-called "plague cemetery".

Kalvarija is one of three hills on which the old town of Zemun developed. The other two are Ćukovac, into which Kalvarija extends in the northeast, and Gardoš, on the right bank of the Danube. However, those hills are not natural features. Zemun loess plateau is the former southern shelf of the ancient, now dried, Pannonian Sea. Modern area of Zemun's Donji Grad was regularly flooded by the Danube and the water would carve canals through the loess. Citizens would then build pathways along those canals and so created the passages, carving the hills out of the plateau. Today it appears that Zemun is built on several hills, with passages between them turned into modern streets, but the hills are actually manmade. In 1883 Austrian general Laudon built a trench through the loess to make way for the railway, thus creating the fourth artificial hill, known today as Bežanijska Kosa. Laudon's trench, whose remnants still can be seen but are turned into an informal settlement, marked to border between the south Kalvarija and north Bežanijska Kosa. The railway was later abolished but the informal settlement remained.

The name is often used just for the old section of the neighborhood. Western, modern part of the neighborhood was officially called Marija Bursać, after a Yugoslav Partisan war hero. It is also name of the central street in the neighborhood and name of the local community (mesna zajednica), municipal sub-administrative unit which also covered Old Kalvarija, with a population of 11,002 in 2002. Surrounding neighborhoods are also named in memory of Partisans, like the commander Sava Kovačević, or battles, like the Battle of Sutjeska (Sutjeska). By 2011 census, most of the local communities of the urban Zemun area were merged into one called Zemun.

Eastern section of the neighborhood is mostly residential, while western was mostly industrial: factories and depots of Navip, Inos Metal, brickwork, etc., which all went bankrupt by the early 21st century. "Bruno Mozer Vinery" was built at modern 7 Mozerova Street. It produced wine and champagne. The halls and buildings were designed by architect Milan Zloković. Within the complex, Zloković also designed the Modernist villa for the Mozer family, built from 1929 to 1931. After World War II the vinery was nationalized by the new Communist authorities and became the beverages factory "Navip". The "Navip" went bankrupt in 2015 and the factory complex went derelict. The villa itself is under the preliminary protection and it can't be demolished. The state tried to sell the complex, but no one wanted to buy it. By 2019 the process was halted as the descendants of the Mozer family applied for the property to be restituted to them.

== Geography ==
Loess terrain of Kalvarija, Ćukovac and Gardoš is one of the most active landslide area in Belgrade. Being cut into for centuries, the loess in some sections have cliffs vertical up to 90%. Additionally, this area is known for lagums, a vast network of underground corridors, which were used for supply and eventual hiding and evacuation. In the previous centuries, settlers left many vertical shafts which ventilated the lagums, drying the loess and keeping it compact. As the city of Zemun grew and got urbanized, the shafts in time were covered or filled with garbage. That way, the corridors retained the moist and began to collapse. Situation is critical after almost every downpour. On 29 September 2011, while constructing the supporting wall which was to prevent landslide in one section of Kalvarija, the construction workers triggered one which killed four of them. A 225 m (738 ft) long lagum, which was actively explored by 2001, is located right below the place where the tragedy happened.

== Parks ==
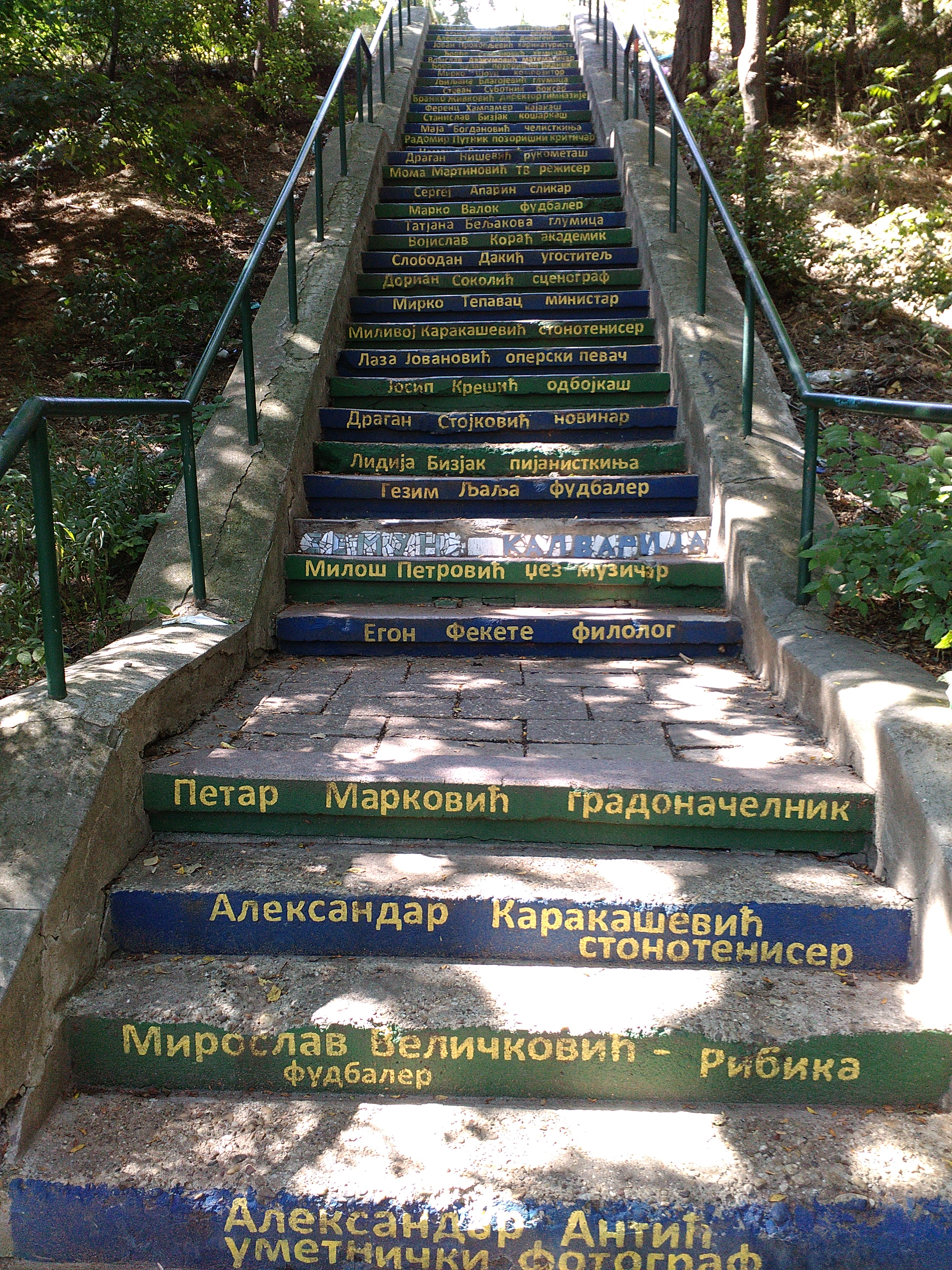
Kalvarija stairway

=== Kalvarija ===
Kalvarija park is located in the northeast corner of the neighborhood, on the top of the Kalvarija hill. The park covers 2.9 hectares (7.2 acres). It is connected to the lower areas of Zemun by the steep stairways. One of them, with 128 steps, which connects the park with Tošin Bunar, became a popular city attraction since 2016. Local communal activist, Nenad Hegediš, after months of persuasion with the local administration, finally obtained a permit to decorate the stairs. With his friends, spending 150 Euros, he painted the lower side of each step alternately in green and blue color. Hegediš and Branko Najhold (1947-2017), Zemun historian, chose names of 128 important people who either originated from Zemun or lived and worked in it and, using stencils, printed their names and occupation in yellow, one name on each stair. The colored stairs were reopened on 23 June 2016. On 29 May 2017 info boards with names, photos and short biographies of 128 people were placed at the stairway. Hegediš and Najhold also published a book Ljudi sa basamaka ("People from the stairs") in 2016. The stairs are now colloquially called Kalvarice, Serbian neologism, a combination of Kalvarija and stepenice, the stairs.

=== Jelovac ===
Jelovac is a trapezoid-shaped, 5 ha (12 acres) large park and the surrounding sub-neighborhood in the center of Kalvarija. In the mid 1980s city government decided that the area was to remain unurbanized. In 2007 attempts were made to construct buildings in the area, but after the protest of the local population, the park remained and it is in the process of reconstruction which began in September 2007 and ended on 16 April 2008. Open children playgrounds with rubber floors were placed, so as the volleyball, soccer and basketball courts, connected by the pedestrian paths. New grass was planted on the area of 6,500 m^{2} (70,000 sq ft) and number of trees in the park was raised from 254 to over 400. Total green area of Jelovac covers 11.91 hectares (29.4 acres), but not all of it is adapted into the proper park.

The name of the park and the neighborhood comes after the Jelovac family from Zemun. Two Jelovac brothers owned original brickworks, which was confiscated by the Communist government after World War II. Apart from the industrial facility, Jelovac family also owned the land on which the park was later planted.
