= Belgrade Fortress =

Fortress in Serbia

- Београдска тврђава Beogradska tvrđava
- Stari Grad, Belgrade in Serbia
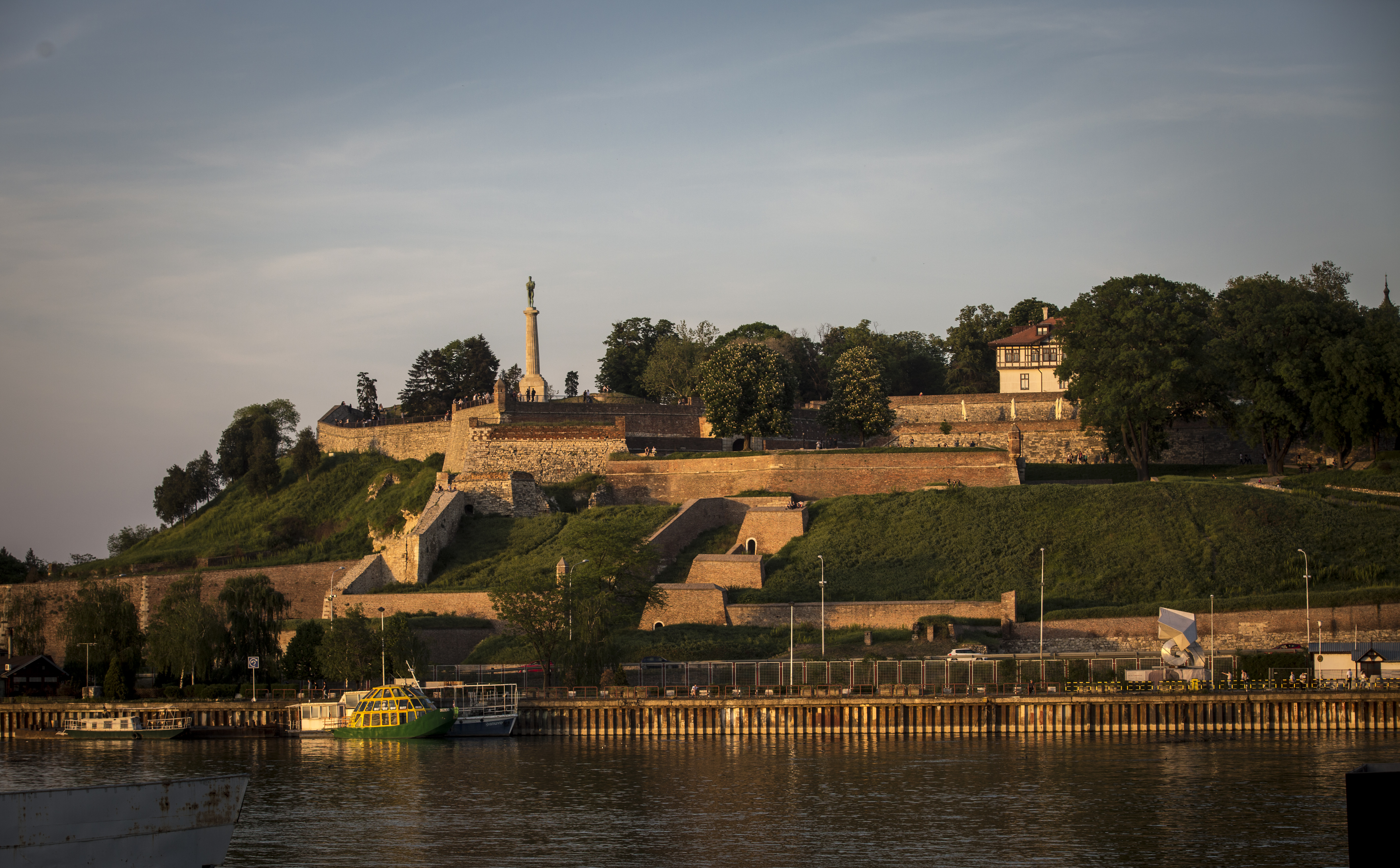

Site information
- Type: Fortification
- Owner: City of Belgrade
- Operator: JKP Beogradska Tvrđava
- Open to the public: Yes
- Website: www.beogradskatvrdjava.co.rs

Location
- Location within Belgrade Belgrade Fortress (Serbia)
- Coordinates: 44°49′24″N 020°27′01″E
- Area: 66 hectares (160 acres)

Site history
- Built: 279 BC
- Built by: Justinian I (reconstructed in 535); Stefan Lazarević (reconstructed in 1403); Nicolas Doxat de Démoret (reconstructed 1723–36)
- Materials: Stone
- Battles/wars: 1440, 1456, 1521, 1688, 1690, 1717, 1739, 1789, 1806.

Cultural Heritage of Serbia
- Type: Cultural Monument of Exceptional Importance
- Designated: 31 May 1965
- Reference no.: SK 3

The Belgrade Fortress (Serbian: Београдска тврђава, Beogradska tvrđava, Hungarian: Nándorfehérvár) is a cultural monument in Belgrade, Serbia in the municipality of Stari Grad. It consists of the old citadel (Upper and Lower Town) and Kalemegdan Park (Large and Little Kalemegdan) on the confluence of the Sava and Danube rivers.

Located in Belgrade's municipality of Stari Grad, the fortress constitutes the specific historical core of the city. As one of the most important representatives of Belgrade's cultural heritage, it was originally protected right after World War II, among the first officially declared cultural monuments in Serbia. The fortress was declared a Monument of Culture of Exceptional Importance in 1979, and is protected by the Republic of Serbia. It is the most visited tourist attraction in Belgrade, with Skadarlija being the second. It is estimated that the total number of visitors (foreign, domestic, citizens of Belgrade) is over 2 million yearly.

== Location ==
Belgrade Fortress is located on top of the 125.5 metres (412 ft) high ending ridge of the Šumadija geological bar. The sandbank stretches at least from the city's Tašmajdan section, originating from the Miocene period, and the oldest stages of the ancient Pannonian Sea. The cliff-like ridge overlooks the Great War Island (Serbian: Veliko ratno ostrvo) and the confluence of the Sava river into the Danube. It borders the neighborhoods of Dorćol (north and north-east), Stari Grad (east) and Kosančićev Venac (Savamala; south). It is bounded by 3 streets (Boulevard of Vojvoda Bojović, Tadeuša Košćuška, and Pariska) plus the railway along the riverside.

== History ==
=== Classical Antiquity ===
Belgrade Fortress is the oldest section of the urban area of Belgrade. For centuries, the city population was concentrated only within the walls of the fortress, and thus the history of the fortress, until most recent times, reflects the history of Belgrade. The first mention of the city is when it was founded in the 3rd century BC as "Singidunum" by the Celtic tribe of Scordisci, who had defeated Thracian and Dacian tribes that previously lived in and around the fort. The city-fortress was later conquered by the Romans and became a part of "the military frontier", where the Roman Empire bordered "barbarian Central Europe". Singidunum was defended by the Roman legion IV Flaviae, which built a fortified camp on a hill at the confluence of the Danube and the Sava rivers. In the period between 378 AD and 441 the Roman camp was repeatedly destroyed in the invasions by the Goths and the Huns. In 476 Belgrade again became the border between the empires: the Western Roman Empire and Eastern Roman Empire (Byzantine Empire), and the Slav-Avar State in the north.

The Celtic fortification was located on top of Terazije ridge, above the confluence of the Sava into the Danube, where the fortress still stands today. Celts also lived in small, open and fortified settlements around the fort, called oppida. Since it is not known for sure where the Celtic fort was; some historians suggest that it was rather close to the necropolises in Karaburma and Rospi Ćuprija. Celtic settlements belonged to the La Tène culture.

The original military camp was probably occupied by the soldiers from the Legio VIII Augusta from 46 AD to 69. Early Singidunum reached its height with the arrival of Legio IV Flavia Felix which was transferred to the city in 86 AD and remained there until the mid 5th century. The presence of Legio IV prompted the construction of a square-shaped castrum (fort), which occupied Upper Town of today's fortress. Construction began at the turn of the 2nd century AD as since the early 100s, Legio IV Flavia Felix became permanently stationed in Singidunum. At first, the fortress was set up as earthen bulwarks and wooden palisades, but soon after, it was fortified with stone as the first stone fort in Belgrade's history. The remains can be seen today near the northeastern corner of the acropolis. The legion also constructed a pontoon bridge over the Sava, connecting Singidunum with Taurunum.

Rectangular castrum covered what is today the Upper Town and the Kalemegdan Park. The castrum had tall walls, built from the white Tašmajdan limestone and spread over the area of 16 ha (40 acres) to 20 ha (49 acres), being shaped as an irregular rectangle (approximately 570 by 330 m (1,870 by 1,080 ft)).

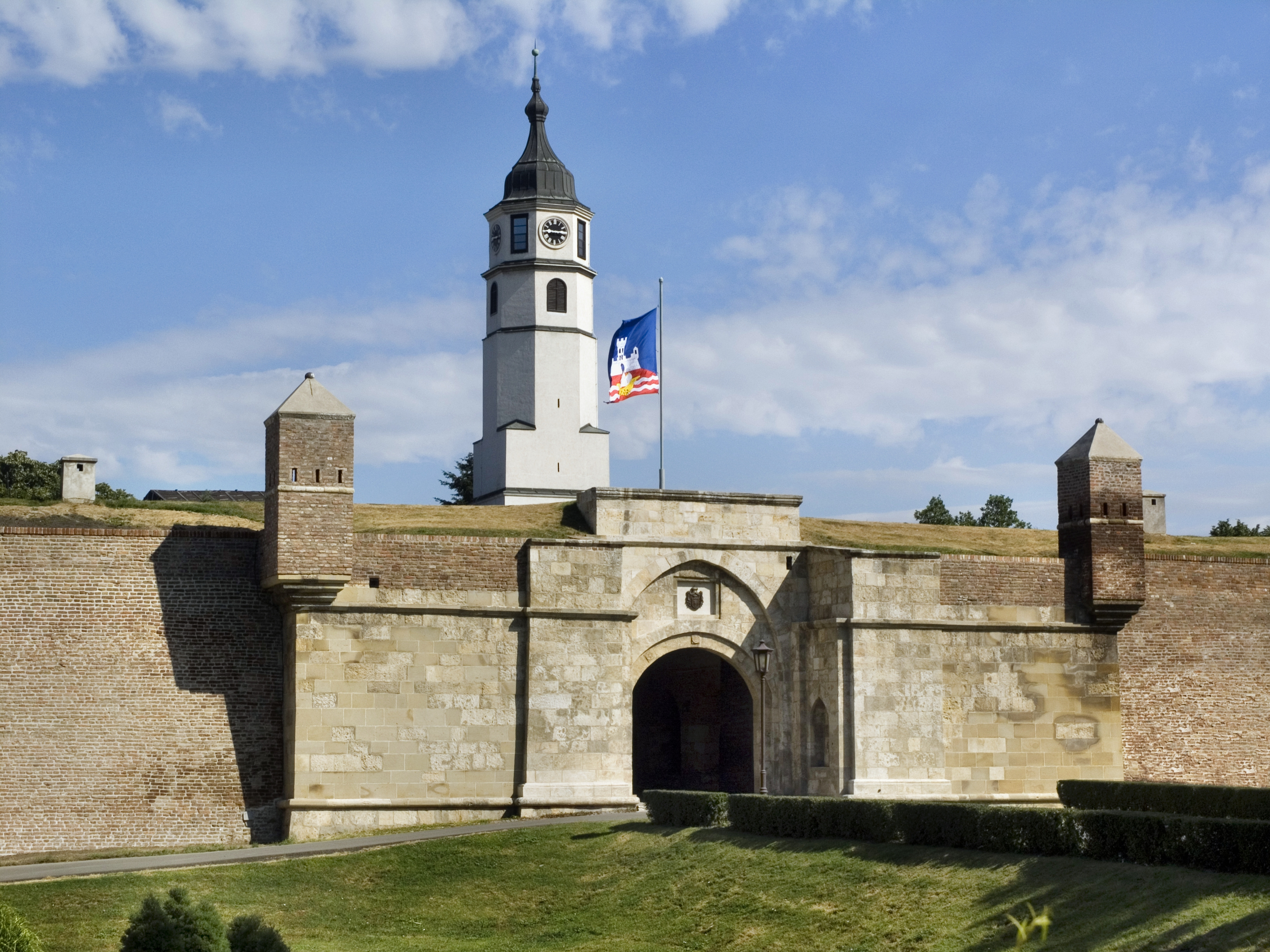
Stambol Gate.

=== Middle Ages ===
The Byzantine Emperor Justinian I rebuilt the fortress around 535. In the following centuries the fortress suffered continuous destruction under the Avar sieges. The Slavs (Serbs) and Avars had their "state union" north of Belgrade with the Serbs and other Slavic tribes finally settling in the Belgrade area as well as the regions west and south of Belgrade in the beginning of the 7th century. The name Belgrade (or Beograd in Serbian), which in most Slavic languages means a "white town" or a "white fortress", was first mentioned in AD 878 by Bulgarians. The fortress kept changing its masters: Bulgaria during three centuries, and then the Byzantines and then again Bulgarians. The fortress remained a Byzantine stronghold until the 12th century when it fell in the hands of the newly emerging Serbian state. It became a border city of the Serbian Kingdom, later Empire with Hungary. The Hungarian king Béla I gave the fortress to Serbia in the 11th century as a wedding gift (his son married the Serbian princess Jelena), but it remained effectively part of Hungary, except for the period 1282–1319.

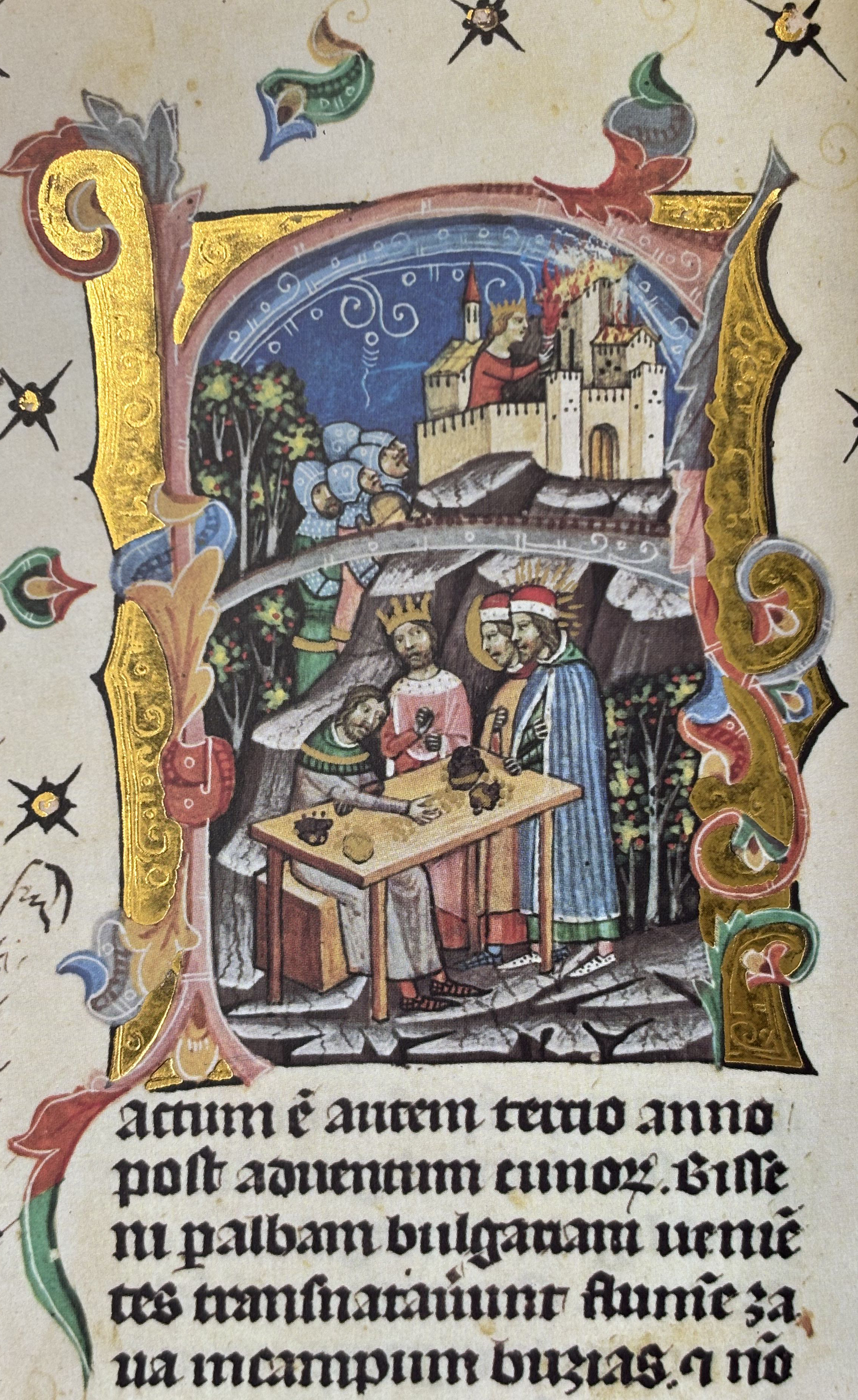
The 1071 Siege of Belgrade depicted in the Illuminated Chronicle

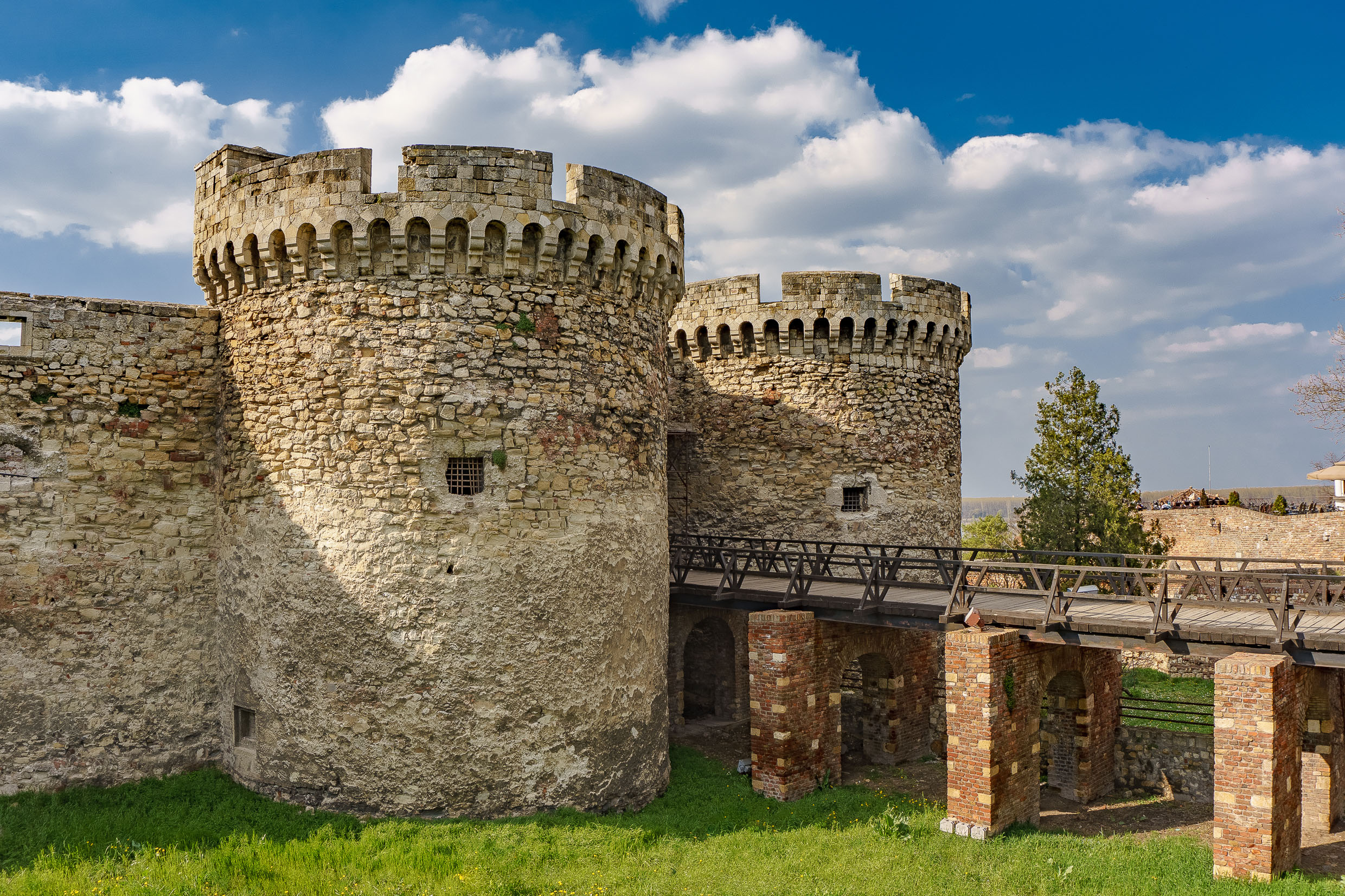
Zindan Gate

After the Serbian state collapsed following the Battle of Kosovo, Belgrade was chosen as the capital of Despot Stefan Lazarević in 1402. Major work was done to the ramparts which were encircling a big thriving town. The lower town at the banks of the Danube was the main urban center with a new built Orthodox cathedral. The upper town with its castle was defending the city from inland. Becoming a major trade and cultural center, Belgrade became a significant immigration town, with immigrants settling from other parts of Serbia, Dubrovnik, Bulgaria, Hungary, Germany, Italy and Venetia. Population blossomed, so the lower city of the fortress, which was the busiest part of the city, had to be significantly expanded.

Belgrade remained in Serbian hands for almost a century. After the Despot's death in 1427, it had to be returned to Hungary. An attempt by the Ottoman Sultan Mehmed II in 1456 to conquer the fortress was prevented by Janos Hunyadi (Siege of Belgrade), saving Hungary from Ottoman dominion for 70 years.

=== Early Modern ===
In 1521, 132 years after the Battle of Kosovo, the fortress, like most parts of the Serbian state, was conquered by the Turks and remained (with short periods of the Austrian and Serbian occupation), under the rule of the Ottoman Empire until the year 1867, when the Turks withdrew from Belgrade and Serbia. During the short period of Austrian rule (1718–1738), the fortress was largely rebuilt and modernized. It witnessed the Great Serbian Migration in the 17th century and two Serbian Uprisings in the 19th century, during the Turkish Period.

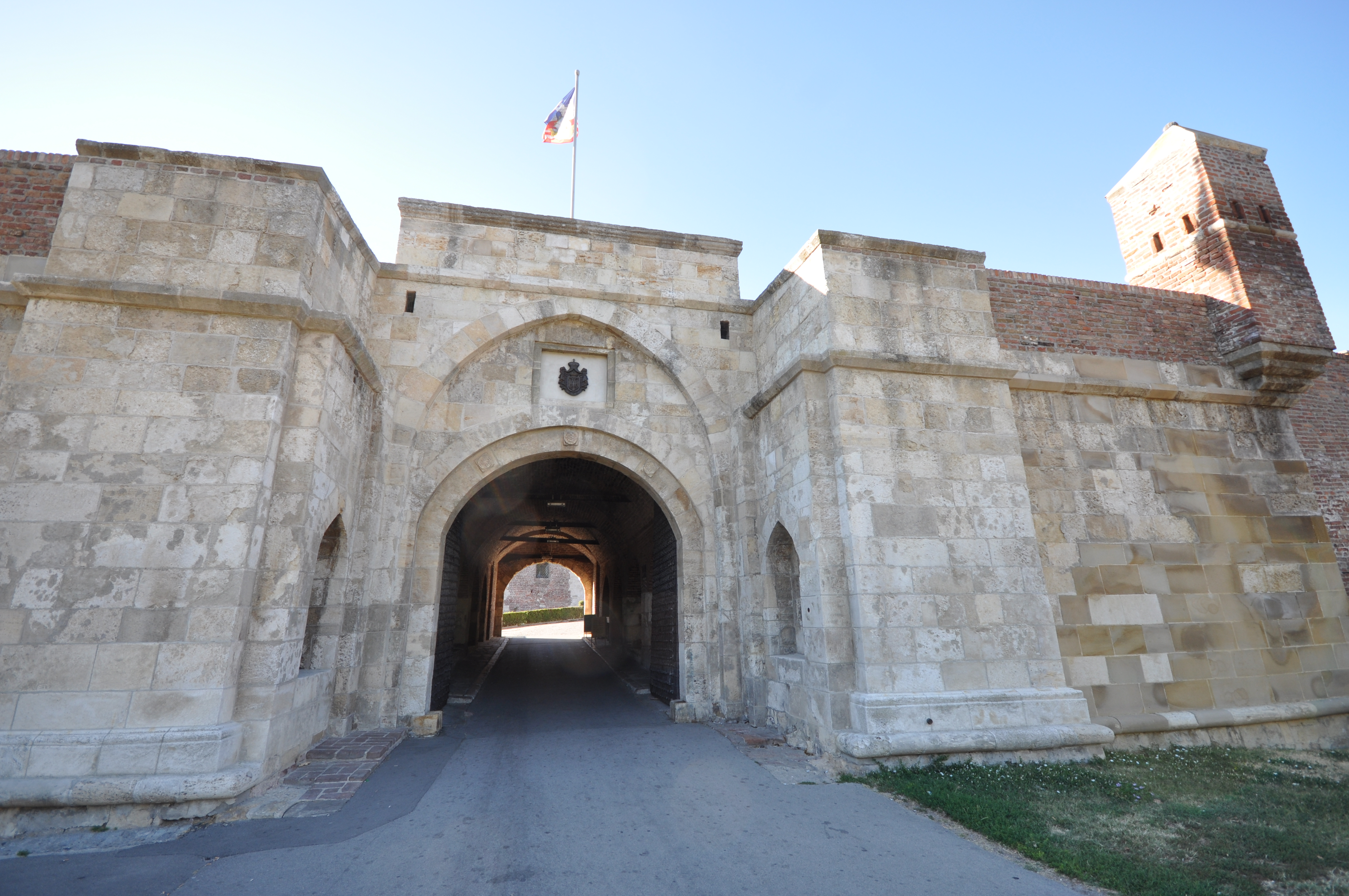
Inner Stambol Gate

During the Austrian occupation of northern Serbia 1717–39, several hospitals were established in Belgrade. The City hospital of Saint John was built within the fortress walls, but its exact location is not known. Emperor Charles VI signed the Belgrade City Statute in 1724 ("Proclamation on organizing German Belgrade"), which mentions city hospital, city pharmacy, medics and midwives. The German municipality had low incomes so it had to ask the state for help and beneficence. The hospital is mentioned in the 1728 Census. It was a hospital already in 1719, later becoming the residence of Thomas Berger, the head of the hospital. After his death, his daughter continued to reside in the building. The hospital (Stattspital) was moved to another location, into the newly constructed building in 1724. A small church was built next to it. This new hospital was quite small, with only 2 rooms, a kitchen and a basement, so it way not be the same city hospital.

Lazaret or a quarantine hospital is not mentioned in the documents, but it is safe to presume that it had to be formed during the viral outbreaks, as was usual in the time. The procedure in case of outbreaks was probably analog to the existing procedure in Buda, the capital of Hungary. Unidentified disease ravaged Belgrade in 1730. Viral epidemic killed a lot of people. During the course of only two weeks, just the Jesuits buried 220 people and themselves lost 3 missionaries. The extremely massive plague outbreak hit the city in October 1738. As the Austrian army retreated in front of the advancing Turks, numerous civilians fled to the fortress, many of them being contagious. Having so many people in a cramped space, triage was not possible so the plague spread quickly. There are reports of the dead lying in the streets for days as there was no one to bury them. The Austrian garrison was decimated and the corpses of the soldiers who died of plague were burned with their personal properties.

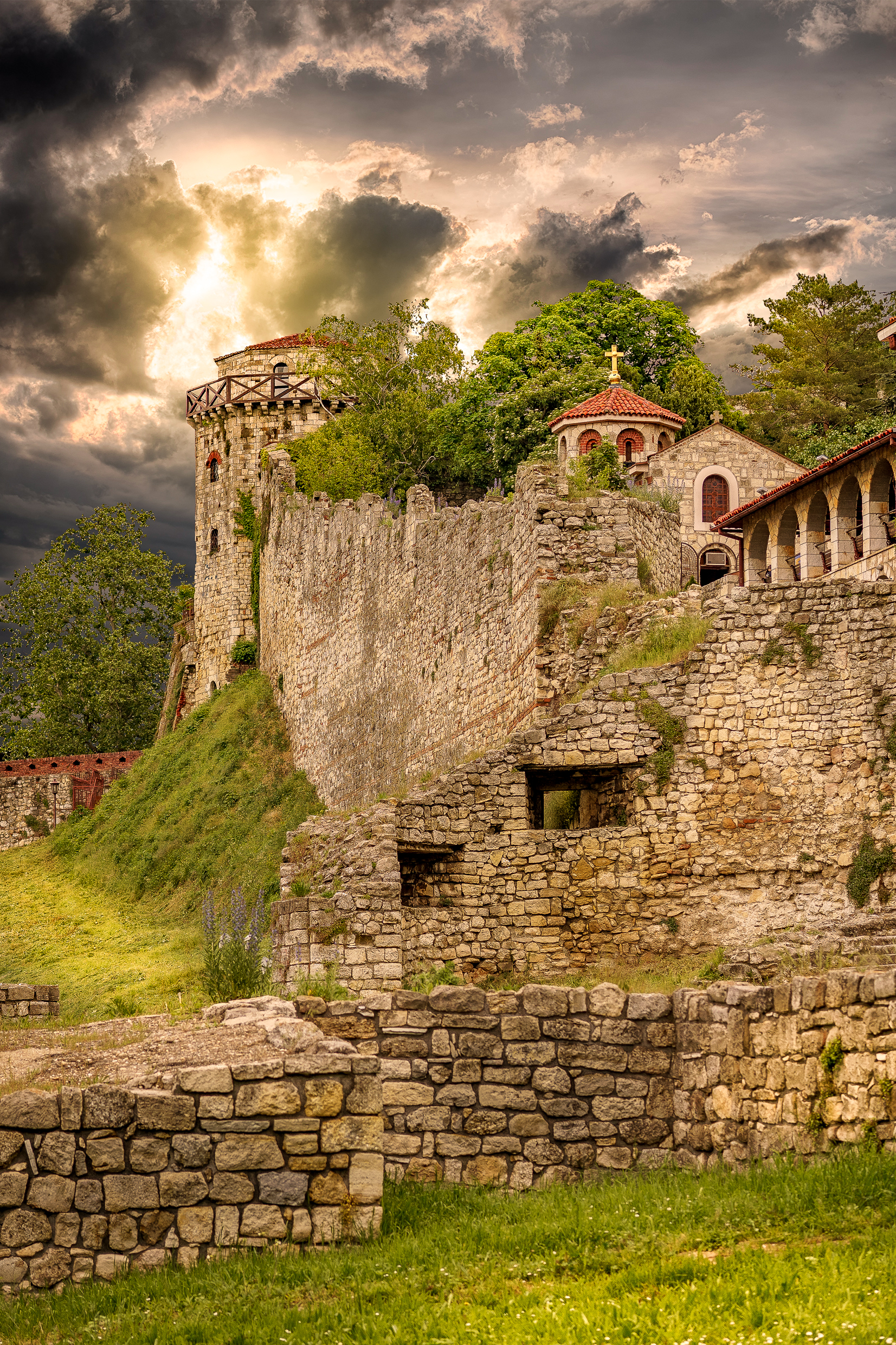
Jakšić's Tower

After Austria lost the Austro-Turkish War of 1737–1739, northern Serbia, including Belgrade, was returned to the Turks. One of the provisions of the 1739 Treaty of Belgrade stated that Austria had to demolish all the fortifications and military and civilian building it had constructed during the occupation. Many Baroque buildings were demolished within the fortress. However, Austria didn't demolish the buildings outside of the fortress walls. That way, the House at 10 Cara Dušana Street, built 1724–1727, in the neighborhood of Dorćol survived, being today the oldest house in Belgrade.

The 1837 plague outbreak almost brought to the war between the ruling prince Miloš Obrenović and the Ottomans in the fortress. The outbreak began in Ottoman Empire in 1836, which had no medical protocols of any kind at the time, and prince Miloš blocked the borders immediately imposing the mandatory quarantine. A group of plague infected Ottoman nizams on the way to Belgrade was halted at the border in Aleksinac and placed in the quarantine, but majority of them fled and continued to Belgrade, spreading the plague on its path (Ražanj, Paraćin, Jagodina, Ćićevac) and ultimately reaching the fortress in the spring of 1837. The prince ordered full and strong siege of the fortress by the Serbian guardsmen, cutting the fortress off completely for six weeks. The pasha complained and threatened from inside the fortress, initially hiding and denying the disease, but the fortress Ottomans were reluctant to start military skirmish in this condition. The besieging was successful as the plague never spread to Belgrade.

Four outer city gates, with the adjoining walls and ramparts were demolished from 1862 (Sava, Vidin and Varoš gates) to 1866 (Stambol Gate). After the Ottomans fully evacuated the inner fortress in 1867, Serbian troops took over, but as the state was still only autonomous (full independence was achieved in 1878), Serbia was only to "manage it" and was not acknowledged as the proprietor of the fortress by the neighboring Austria-Hungary. First squad of Serbian soldiers, under the command of colonel Svetozar Garašanin, ceremonially replaced the Ottoman guardsmen on 18 April 1867. First action by the Serbian authorities, just 5 days after the Ottomans left in April 1867, was to rebuild the Ružica Church.

After the Ottoman withdrawal, newspapers in Austro-Hungary continuously published stories, backed by the military experts, that the fortress became strategically obsolete and that, having no value of any kind, Austrian army could destroy it in 24 hours. In the autumn of 1867 citizens were awaken by the heavy artillery fire. Ruling prince Mihailo Obrenović sent two batteries to the fortress (where modern Monument of Gratitude to France is) and ordered them to fire at the fortress wall where the old wooden bridge was located. A barrage fire of 300 salvos from De Bange cannons shelled the fortress during the entire day. It remained unclear why the prince ordered this: he decided to demolish the fortress completely, as such stories spread among the citizens; he wanted to show to the Austrians that the fortress has its values and importance, and that it can't be destroyed in a day (despite all the shelling, only 15 m (49 ft) of rampart was destroyed); or he simply did it to spite the Austrians. The shelling also disturbed the citizens of Zemun, across the Sava, which was part of Austro-Hungary at the time, and some of the grenades which missed the target hit Austro-Hungarian soil, so the imperial government sent an official diplomatic note to Serbia, protesting the shelling and reminding the prince he is only a "caretaker" of the fortress.

After the takeover of the fortress, Serbian forces kept finding parts of the gallows, chains, gibbets and impalement stakes in the dungeons, used previously by the Ottomans to torture the prisoners. Official reports by the Serbian army hold claims by the soldiers of the "ghoulish, headless and limbless wraiths" and other abominations roaming the fortress. The army issued an order that, despite there was no enemy anymore, all guards must keep watch "at least in pairs". Mihailo's successor, prince and later king Milan Obrenović, ordered the leveling of the terrain in the eastern sections of the fortress and planting of the greenery and trees, which in time developed into the Kalemegdan Park.

=== Modern ===
After the Third Hatt-i sharif of 1833, issued by the Ottoman sultan Mahmud II, number of Turks remaining to live in Belgrade was limited to 6,000, including women and children, and a strong Turkish garrison. Only Turks were allowed to live in the Upper Town, while both Turks and Serbs were allowed to live in the Lower Town. The gates were guarded by the Turkish sentries, except when prince Miloš was visiting the Lower Town, when they were replaced with Serbian policemen. There were two administrators, one Turkish and one Serbian. The Turkish administrator had jurisdiction only over the Turkish population, but in the Turkish-Serbian matters, Serbian judge was presiding. In the mid-1830s there were 3,000 houses in the Lower Town of which 2,500 were owned by the Turks who rented them to the Serbs.

Later, while it was inhabited, the fortress formed one of the quarters in the administrative division of Belgrade. It was called Grad ("city") for administrative purposes and continued to be translated in the foreign languages as "fortress". According to the censuses, it had a population of 2,219 in 1890, 2,281 in 1895, 2,777 in 1900, 2,396 in 1905 and 454 in 1910.

Kalemegdan was the location of the second airport in Serbia, after one in the neighborhood of Banjica from 1910. A field in the Donji Grad was adapted for planes in January 1911. It was situated along the bank of the Sava river, from the old hammam or bathhouse (now the modern Planetarium) to the mouth of the Sava into the Danube. One of the flight pioneers, Edvard Rusjan, died in an airplane crash after taking off from this field and being hit by the gust of košava on 9 January 1911. Remains of Rusjan's plane were originally exhibited in Donji Grad and his funeral was one of the largest recorded in Belgrade. Surviving rib of this airplane became the first exhibit in the predecessor of the modern Aeronautical Museum Belgrade. Today, the area is used by the parachutists and paragliders and as the location of the air shows for sports and ultra-light aviation. In June 2021 it was announced that the memorial bench dedicated to Rusjan will be placed below the fortress and that surrounding green area will be named the Edvard Rusjan Park.

The fortress and the park were damaged during World War I. Serbian army had no proper weaponry to fight the Austro-Hungarian gunboats, so they freely fired at the city from the Sava. The city was especially damaged during the heavy bombardment in 1914–1915. Diplomat and author Radoje Janković described it in 1914: "Kalemegdan is "trimmed", the trees in the park are battered, the ancient ramparts of Singidunum crushed, all being hit by the heavy, modern artillery, from precisely measured distance and even more precisely unmeasured hatred". Heavy fighting occurred in the Lower Town in 1915, when Serbian forces, led by major Dragutin Gavrilović, persistently but ultimately unsuccessfully, fought the invading Austro-Hungarian army. Before full occupation, Austro-Hungarian army temporarily entered Belgrade, from 3 to 14 December 1914. Already on 4 December they erected gallows in fortress' Upper Town, and on several other locations around the town, for hanging civilians.

In 1928, building company "Šumadija" proposed the construction of the cable car, which they called "air tram". The project was planned to connect Zemun to Belgrade Fortress, via Great War Island. The interval of the cabins was set at 2 minutes and the entire route was supposed to last 5 minutes. The project was never realized, but the idea of the cable car was revived in the 21st century. Funiculars were also planned, to connect the Upper and the Lower Town. The entire Lower town was planned for demolition, with the plans including large amusement park, museums, artificial lake, zoo, and stadiums instead of the existing military barracks. Instead of everything, the railway was conducted around the foothills of the fortress, encircling it completely, and effectively cutting it off from the Sava river, which wasn't universally accepted among the architects and urbanists of the day.

During his visit to the 1936 Berlin Olympics, Yugoslav prime minister Milan Stojadinović was fascinated by the objects built for the games, especially by the grandiose Olympic Stadium. He instigated the Yugoslav Olympic Committee to nominate Belgrade as the host of the 1948 Olympics and invited Werner March, architect of the Berlin stadium, to visit Belgrade and design objects for the games. March came to Belgrade in May 1938 and suggested the Fortress' Lower Town as the location for the Olympic complex. Without architectural design competition or bidding, Stojadinović's government accepted his idea and gave him carte blanche regarding the design. The project was finished in 1939 and the architectural model was exhibited in October 1940 at the "Exhibition of the new German architecture" in the German pavilion at the Belgrade Fair.

In the early 1940, March began the preparatory works, as he also planned the partial remodeling of the fortress outside of the sports complex, too. He incited archaeological survey and invited German architectural historian Daniel Krencker to study the excavations. Within the scopes of the Nazi expansion of the megaprojects, and augmentation of the German historic role and importance in this region, Krencker praised March's project as the "artistic dream, which represents rare and major German cultural act which will contribute to the old German glory of Belgrade". Just few days after German scientists left the fortress, Germany attacked Yugoslavia on 6 April 1941. The Olympic complex was pushed aside, shifting the focus of the Germans to the archaeological exploration of the fortress during the war.

The fortress suffered further damage during World War II. Military Museum was damaged in the April 1941 bombing, and subsequently looted. It was immediately placed under the authority of the German Military Museums Chief, repaired, and reopened for public in July 1941. After almost two millennia of continuous sieges, battles and conquests, the fortress is today known as the Belgrade Fortress. The present name of Kalemegdan Park derives from two Turkish words, kale (fortress) and meydan (field), literally meaning "fortress field".

After World War II, before skiing facilities were built on the mountains further from Belgrade, the slopes of Kalemegdan (so as of Banovo Brdo, Košutnjak and Avala), were used by Belgraders for skiing. Also, immediately after the war, some parts of the fortress were closed for public. In some parts the new, Yugoslav People's Army was stationed, while others were closed because of the ammunition left behind.

In 2018 it was announced that the entire riverbanks section from the Branko's Bridge on the Sava, to the Pančevo Bridge on the Danube, will be transformed into the linear park, patterned after the High Line park in New York City and Zaryadye Park in Moscow. It would encircle the Belgrade Fortress. In April 2019 it was announced that the park will stretch for 4.7 km (2.9 mi), covering an area of 47 ha (120 acres). In August 2021, city expanded the project to 66 ha (160 acres), but only 22.8 ha (56 acres) will actually make the green corridor, while the rest will be privately owned residential buildings, commercial venues and sports fields. This caused negative comments from experts. New design would actually push people away from the river, to walk along the present boulevard which encircles the fortress. The fortress itself will end up being additionally degraded and devalued, so architects and archaeologists suggested surveys, explorations and conservation of the fortress' foothills instead. The park project was described as a smokescreen, with the actual purpose of selling the riverbanks to the private investors and elevating the real estate prices.

In 2022, new city administration headed by mayor Aleksandar Šapić included in the city's urban plan relocation of the Belgrade Zoo out of the fortress. In February 2023, Šapić announced relocation to the Ada Safari section of Ada Ciganlija island. City manager, Miroslav Čučković, explained the relocation: "Since the foundation of the new city administration...we made decisions which are connected to our dedication to spaces to which Belgraders were coming close to in all of these previous years. Those are spaces for which we think should have some new type of content and possibility to directly invest into them". Šapić added that the "political decision was made to handle this", and, if everything goes by the plan, the relocation might be finished in three years.

Public and experts' backlash against the project was massive, mostly regarding hastiness, arbitration, irrelevance, legality and selected location. Public speculated that the residents of the newly built affluent K-Distrikt residential complex across the zoo are bothered by the smell, or that some more lucrative structures might be built instead of the zoo on such exceptional location, since "direct investments" were given as one of the reasons. Šapić then retreated a bit, stating this is just a "political idea" which is not hastily made, that only now analyses and surveys will be done to check the viability, that nothing will be built instead of the zoo but the fortress will be conserved instead, and that there is no set time frame for the project.

== Archaeology ==
=== World War II ===
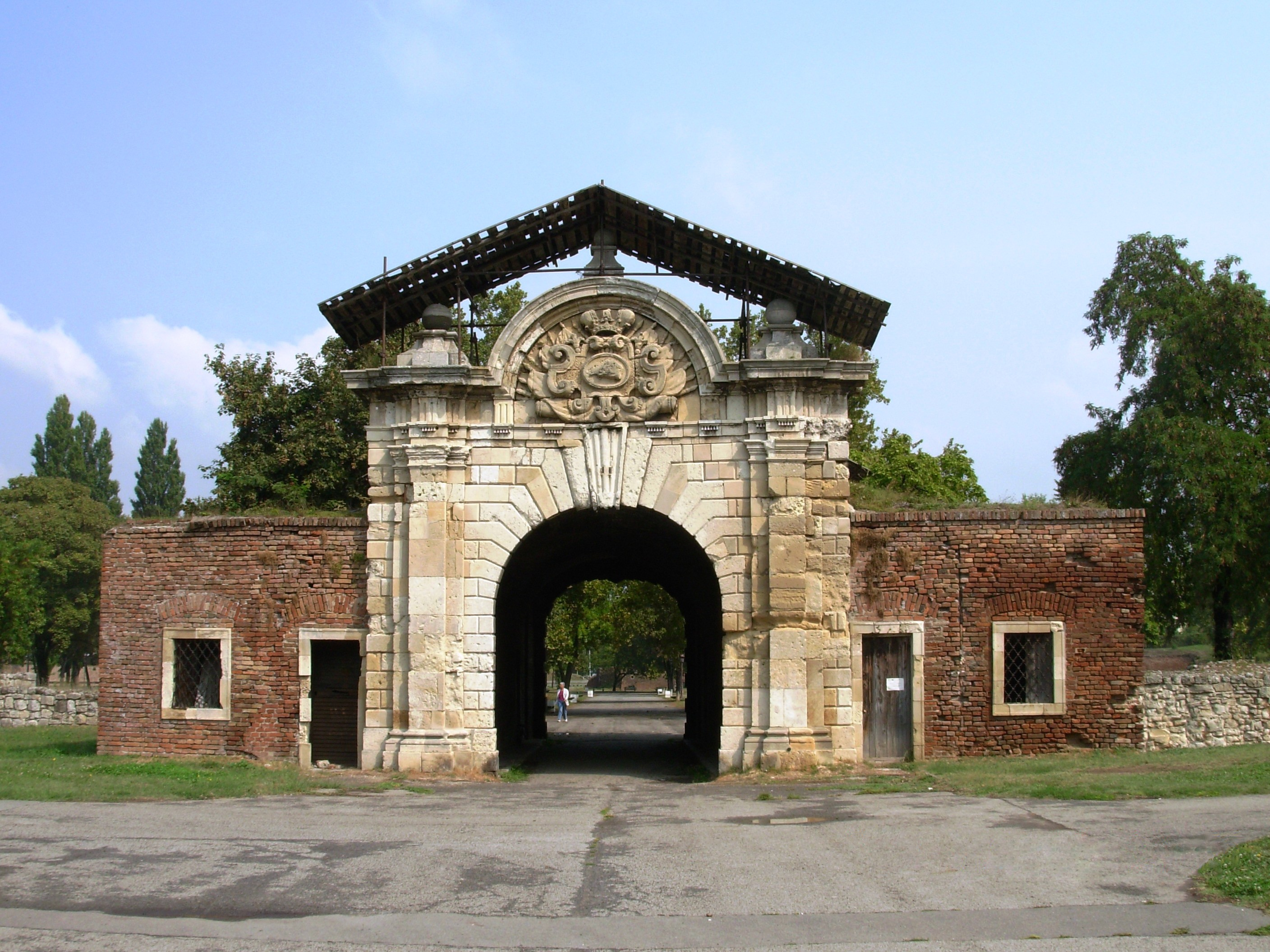
Gate of Charles VI.

Already in April 1941, professor and major Johann von Reiswitz was appointed to the Referat for the Protection of the Cultural Values in Serbia. He saved numerous cultural objects in Serbia, which won him praise even from some Serbian historians after the war. On 20 October 1941 the Lower Town was fenced on his orders of keeping and protecting the fortress. He also began archaeological digging. However, the right to dig in the fortress was asked from both the pseudo-scientific organization Ahnenerbe and the Main Work Group Southeast of the Reichsleiter Rosenberg Taskforce. Pressured financially and politically, von Reiswitz felt he must side with one of them, so he arranged the participation of Ahnenerbe with organization's head Walther Wüst in October 1941. Based on this, collaborationist Minister for Education and Religion Velibor Jonić issued the "permit on monopoly" to Ahnenerbe's Secretary General Wolfram Sievers in February 1942.

Austrian prehistorian Friedrich Holste was selected to conduct the survey, but he was killed in May 1942 near Kharkiv, Ukraine, before reaching Belgrade. He was replaced with Wilhelm Unverzagt, director of the Berlin's Museum for Prehistory and Early History. Joined by Sievers and Herbert Jankuhn, Heinrich Himmler's close associate, Unverzagt began targeted digging, searching for the material proof to confirm the German idea of transforming Belgrade into Prinzeugenstadt. He specifically searched for the monumental gate at the entry into the Lower Town, built during the Nicolas Doxat's rebuilding of Belgrade under the orders of Prince Eugene of Savoy in the 1720s and 1730s. The gate was named after the Holy Roman Emperor from that period, Charles VI. Already on 15 July 1941, secretary in the Reich Ministry of the Interior Wilhelm Stuckart sent memo, asking for Belgrade to be transformed into the "Reich's Fortress". It was to be connected military with the copper and gold Bor mines and the Danube's Iron Gates gorge, to create the Banat area protection zone. This zone was intended to become Eugenia, or Prinz Eugen's District, where Danube Swabians were to settle and expand.

The digging lasted through 1942 and 1943, when it was stopped after the Allied bombing of Belgrade began. By 1943, the Germans completely rebuilt the Gate of Charles VI, in greatest detail. Reconstruction included the cartouche with the initials of the emperor on the capital from the outer side, and the supposed coat-of-arms of never-existing Tribalia, on the inner side (boar with an arrow pierced through the head). As the motif of this coat-of-arms appeared in medieval Serbian seals and was adopted as part of the Serbian coat-of-arms after First Serbian Uprising in 1804, it was meant to show the incorporation of Serbia into the western empire. The gate was damaged already during the heavy Allied Easter bombing in April 1944.

It is not known whether Ahnenerbe was searching for something specifically or just wanted to falsify the route by which Aryans reached Germany from the Middle East. Some surviving documents show that they discovered remains of Celtic and Gothic settlements, a trench from the Roman period and relics from the Austrian rule after the conquest of Eugene of Savoy. Some sources claim that after the bombing started, documentation and part of the artifacts were transported to Lebus, in Germany and are considered to be lost. Others claim that the entire material was stored in the Belgrade City Museum. What is known for sure is that during the "terrain cleaning" in 1941–1942, the Germans completely destroyed the foundations of the Austrian artillery barrack built in the 1723-1736 period.

=== Post war ===
On 29 February 1952 the city adopted the "Decision on protection, adaptation and maintenance of the people's park of Kalemegdan" which set the borders of the protected areas as the rivers of Danube and Sava and the streets of Tadeuša Košćuškog and Pariska. In 1962, Belgrade's Institute for the cultural monuments protection expanded the zone to several blocks across the streets. Detailed plan on Kalemegdan from 1965 provided that, despite the immense archaeological value that lies beneath the fortress ground, basically only what was discovered by that time can be explored, restored or protected. That caused the problem both for the expansion of the park but even more for the further exploration of the fortress' underground. Best example is the Lower Town where neither the park fully developed nor the remains of the former port, which was located there, are visible.

The area of the fortress is 66 ha (160 acres). By 2000, only 5% of that area was archaeologically surveyed, and by 2010 that number rose to 12% or 8 ha (20 acres). Based on the findings so far, it is estimated that during the rule of despot Stefan Lazarević in the first half of the 15th century, when Belgrade became capital of Serbia, the city within the fortress had 5,600 to 12,000 inhabitants. Archaeological examinations were done on the following locations:

- Upper Town in the inner fortress; surveyed 1948–2009; found remains belong to the Prehistory, Antiquity, Middle Ages and Turkish-Austrian period
- waterfront rampart in Lower Town 1963–2010; Middle Ages and Turkish-Austrian period
- Kalemegdan Park 1973–2010; antiquity, Middle Ages and Turkish-Austrian period
- Belgrade Zoo 1988; antiquity, Middle Ages and Turkish-Austrian period

In September 1969 major discoveries were announced. The appearance of the Lower Town was almost completely changed after the excavation. The medieval cobblestone was uncovered, so as the old ramparts and gates. In the process, the Lower Town was made more accessible to the visitors, including the new stairway and reconstruction of the part of the medieval rampart. In the Upper Town, four large, massive pillars from the period of despot Stefan Lazarević (15th century) were discovered. They are remains of the medieval bridge which was located in front of the main entry into the inner fort of the city. The fort was surrounded by the deep trench. It was previously known that an inner, bascule bridge existed within the fortress, which survived until the 17th century, but its exact location and type of construction were unknown.

The explored sections after 2000 include the access downhill path to the Small Staircase in Kalemegdan Park, the bastion on the Sava slope, the gates of King, Sava, Dark and Karađorđe, the Great Ravelin, etc. During the 2017 reconstruction of the Mehmed Paša Sokolović's Fountain, next to Defterdar's Gate in the Gornji Grad, several archaeological discoveries were made. Remnants of the Roman castrum, two urns from the Bronze Age and remains of the Neolithic object were discovered. The findings were conserved and reburied.

== Features ==
Belgrade Fortress is generally divided into four sections. The four sections, two of which make the fortress itself (Donji and Gornji Grad) and two make Kalemegdan park today, were divided by the Tsarigrad Road, on the location of modern pedestrian path next to the Cvijeta Zuzorić Art Pavilion.

=== Lower Town ===
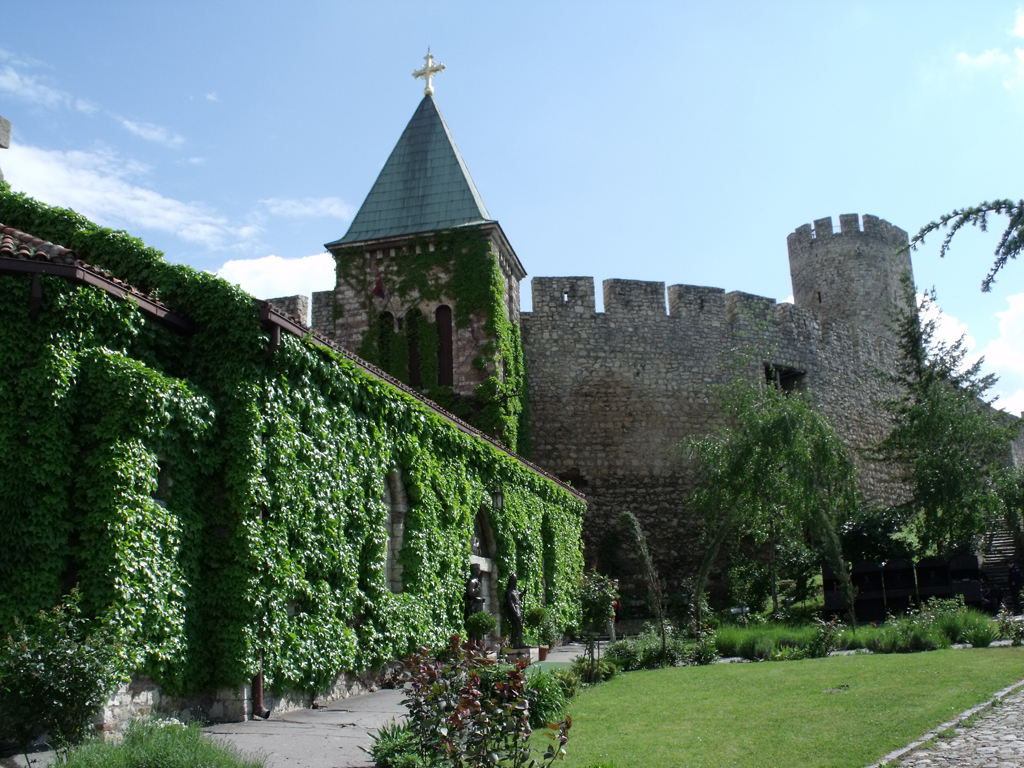
Ružica Church

Donji Grad (Доњи Град); occupies the slope towards the riversides, from the top spot (ridge where "The Victor" is). Between the lowest section and the Danube is Kula Nebojša ("Impregnable, Fearless, or Daredevil Tower"), which has been turned into a museum of the Greek revolutionary Rigas Feraios, who was strangled by the Turks in this tower and his corpse thrown into the Danube. Donji Grad, like the neighboring Savamala, frequently suffers from flooding, and Kula Nebojša suffered extensive damage during the major floods of 2006. The Orthodox churches of Ružica (former Austrian gun depot) and Sveta Petka are also located in this area, as is the Belgrade Planetarium.

The modern church of Sveta Petka was projected by architect Momir Korunović. Construction began in the first half of the 1930s, on the location of an old chapel. It was consecrated on 27 October 1937, the feast day of Parascheva of the Balkans, called Petka in Serbian.

During the tenure of mayor Dragan Đilas (2008–13), the idea of expanding the zoo to Donji Grad, which it occupied prior to the World War II, resurfaced, but the experts were against it. The urban plan for the fortress from 1965 already projected the complete relocation of the zoo outside of the fortress, to some suburban locations, which in later plans included Veliko Blato, Stepin Lug or Jelezovac. The expansion of the zoo would cut the pedestrian communication between the Danube's and Sava's parts of the fortress, which was already cut in 1949 but was restored in 2009 with the reconstruction and opening of the Sava Gate. Also, it would prevent the exploration of Donji Grad, which is still largely unexplored and leave the Gate of Charles VI, a masterpiece of Balthasar Neumann, within the zoo itself. As of 2017, the zoo was not relocated but the idea of expansion was dropped, too.

Apart from the protection of the fortress as the cultural monument, parts of the Lower Town, and the slope which separates it from the Upper Town are protected as a natural monument. The area was included in the first protection of the fortress in 1946. In 1968 two areas were separately protected: "Maritime Neogenic Ridge - profile under the Pobednik monument in Kalemegdan" and "Geological-geographical layers at Kalemegdan locality, at the Pobednik monument". Serbian Environmental Agency drafted a study on the area and submitted it to the government in 2017. In February 2021, the government joined two previously protected area and expanded the protected area to 14.07 ha (34.8 acres), establishing a natural monument of Kalemegdan Sandbank. The area is a unique geological feature in Serbia, as the remains of the sea ridge of the oldest stage in the history of the Pannonian Sea. Those include sediments originating from the middle, Badenian stage of the Miocene period. The cliffs are thought to have a historical importance also - the Slavic name of Belgrade, white town, according to one of the theories, originates from the exposed white layers of Miocene limestone on top of which the city was built.

==== Church of the Dormition of the Most Holy Mother of God ====
The Church of the Dormition of the Most Holy Mother of God, which also served as the cathedral church, was built sometimes in the 12th century, during the restored Byzantine rule. The church contained a miraculous icon of the Mother of God. It is recorded that the Byzantine princess and Serbian queen Simonida worshiped the icon in 1315 when she visited Belgrade. The structure itself was a large, three-nave church with a large dome. As Belgrade was generally neglected in the second half of the 14th century, the church also deteriorated a lot.

When the Hungarians handed over the city to Serbian despot Stefan Lazarević, he began massive reconstruction of the fortress, including the church, which was restored and expanded. Chronicler Constantine the Philosopher described the church, including the famed icon of the Mother of God, relics of Saint Petka and Saint Empress Theophano (relocated to Belgrade after the fall of Bulgaria to the Ottomans), icons of the Twelve apostles (six on both sides), and the reliquary containing a hand. Despot added the choirs and the monastery complex around it. The church became the seat of the Metropolitan of Belgrade, this time of the Serbian Orthodox Church, and he was proclaimed the "exarch of all Serbian lands".

Over two decades later, when Belgrade was returned to the Hungarians, the building of the Metropolitan's Seat was built next to it. On the very day the Ottomans conquered Belgrade, 29 August 1521, they turned the church into the mosque. The cross was removed from the top of the roof, the icons were painted over and the church bells were remelted. Already tomorrow, Ottoman sultan Suleiman the Magnificent observed the main Islamic Friday prayer, the jumu'ah namaz, in the former church. When Suleiman resettled Belgrade Christians to Constantinople, they took with them the icon of the Mother of God and relics of Saint Petka and Saint Theophano. Part of them were settled in the Istanbul's neighborhood today known as Belgradkapı, or Belgrade Gate, where they built the Church of Theotokos, and presumably kept the icons and relics. Interiors and all the relics in this church were destroyed during the 1955 Istanbul pogrom.

Close to the church, the Ottomans dug into the ground a large gunpowder magazine. During the Austrian attack under the Eugene of Savoy, the Austrian army directly hit the magazine on 17 August 1717 causing an explosion which demolished almost all structures in the Lower Town, including the church. During their massive reconstruction of the fortress, and construction of the Baroque Belgrade which ensued in 1720–1739, the Austrians never reconstructed the church. Furthermore, in order to level the terrain in the Lower Town, they completely demolished the church ruins. Today, it is not known for neither where the church was exactly located, nor what its exterior looked like.

The only surviving part of the church are remains of the marble lintel with the incomplete ktetor's inscription by despot Stefan Lazarević: В Христа Бога благоверни деспот Стеф...Београдске обнових место сие и призидах певнице и...придржеш... It was accidentally discovered in 1967. Larger remains of the Metropolitan's Seat were discovered in 1977. They include arched open walls of the former porch. In February 2021, city announced it will finance the archaeological surveys on the locations where the church may have been built, in hope that at least the foundations of the church are preserved being buried underground.

=== Upper Town ===
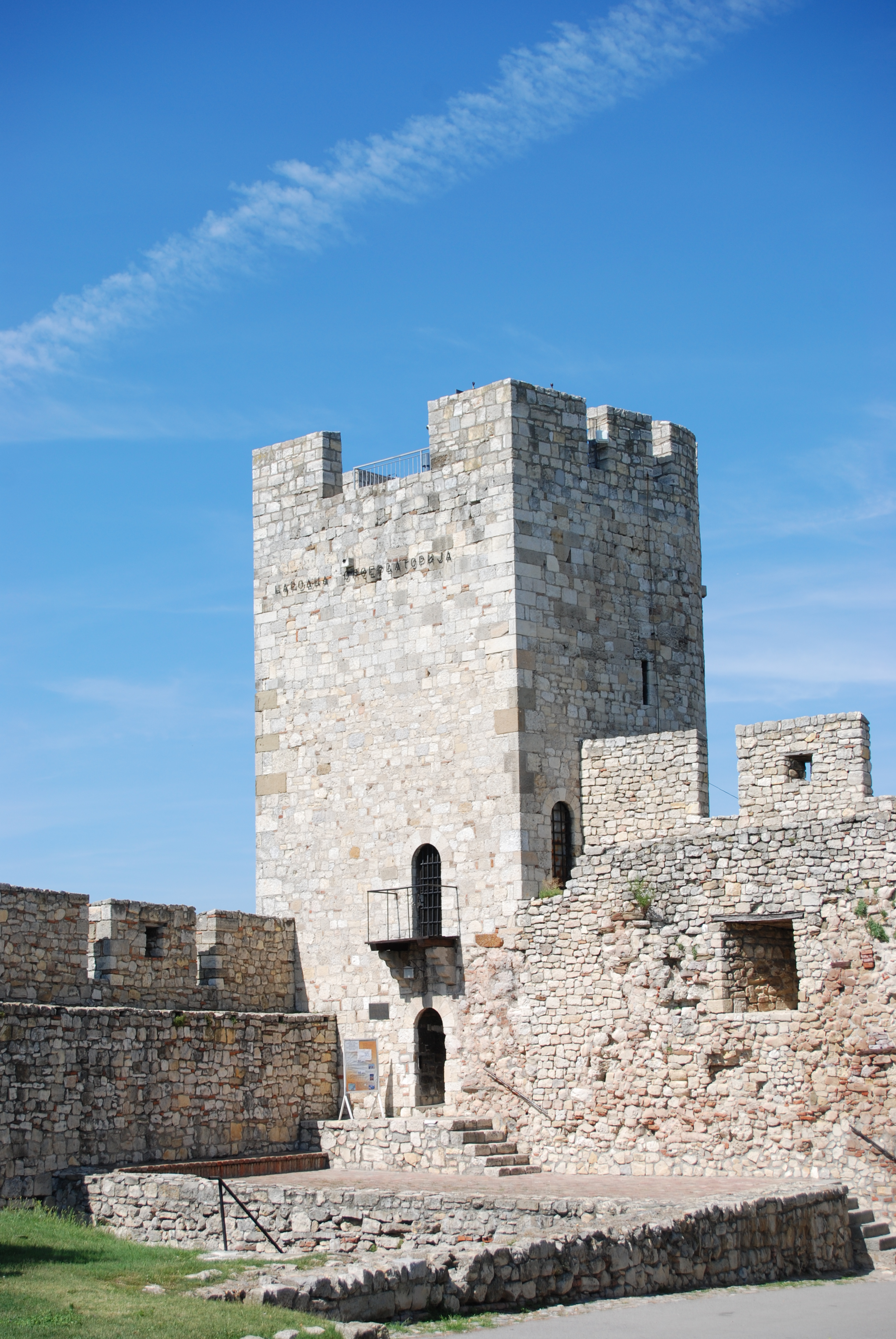
Despot Stefan Tower

Gornji Grad (Горњи Град), the upper section of fortress, turned into a park, with beautiful promenades and the statue of "The Victor" (Serbian: Pobednik), the so-called "Roman well" (Serbian: Rimski bunar), actually built by the Austrians, the Popular Observatory (since 1963) in the Despot Stefan Tower, the türbe (tomb) of Damad Ali Pasha, Mehmed Paša Sokolović's Fountain, tennis and basketball courts, etc.

==== Gunpowder magazine (ca 1720s) ====
Also adapted for visits is the Great Austrian gunpowder magazine, built during the Austrian occupation of Belgrade 1718–39, after they destroyed the old one during the 1717 Siege of Belgrade. They directly hit the magazine with a cannonball and the explosion which followed allowed the Austrians to capture the city. The object is located below the 7 m (23 ft) tall rampart. The magazine is today embellished with the artifacts from the Roman period which were discovered in or around the fortress: tombstone stelae, monuments, altars and the Sarcophagus of Jonah, which originates from the 3rd century AD. It was arranged and opened for visitors in 2014.

One of the Roman marble monuments, exhibited since 2012, was the so-called Herkulanka (after Herculaneum, where first such sculptures were discovered in the 18th century). They were usually honorary representations of important women. Estimated to be work of some local sculptor to represent one of the more important female residents of Singidunum, it was made in c.300 and was found close to the Military Museum. The represented woman is rich, in heavily draped chiton, with the himation mantle wrapped over the arm and head. In May 2020, there was a break in the magazine's lapidarium, and the Herkulanka was vandalized and broken.

==== Roman well (ca 1720s) ====
The present facility, called the Roman Well, is neither Roman nor a (water) well. It is located along the southwest rampart of the Upper Town, in the vicinity of the Pobednik monument and the "King's Gate". An underground object existed during the mediaeval period and is referenced by Constantine of Kostenets during the rule of Despot Stefan Lazarević, in the first half of the 15th century. It apparently was a dungeon as it was mentioned during the 1456 Siege of Belgrade when 30 Hungarian conspirators died in it after their scheme to let the Turks into the fortress and surrender the city to them was thwarted. They were to be paid by the Turks, but were discovered and dropped into the pit with ropes. They were left there without food and after they began losing their minds from hunger, they were thrown knives to kill each other. Turkish traveler Evliya Çelebi in 1660 wrote about the object as the grain silo.

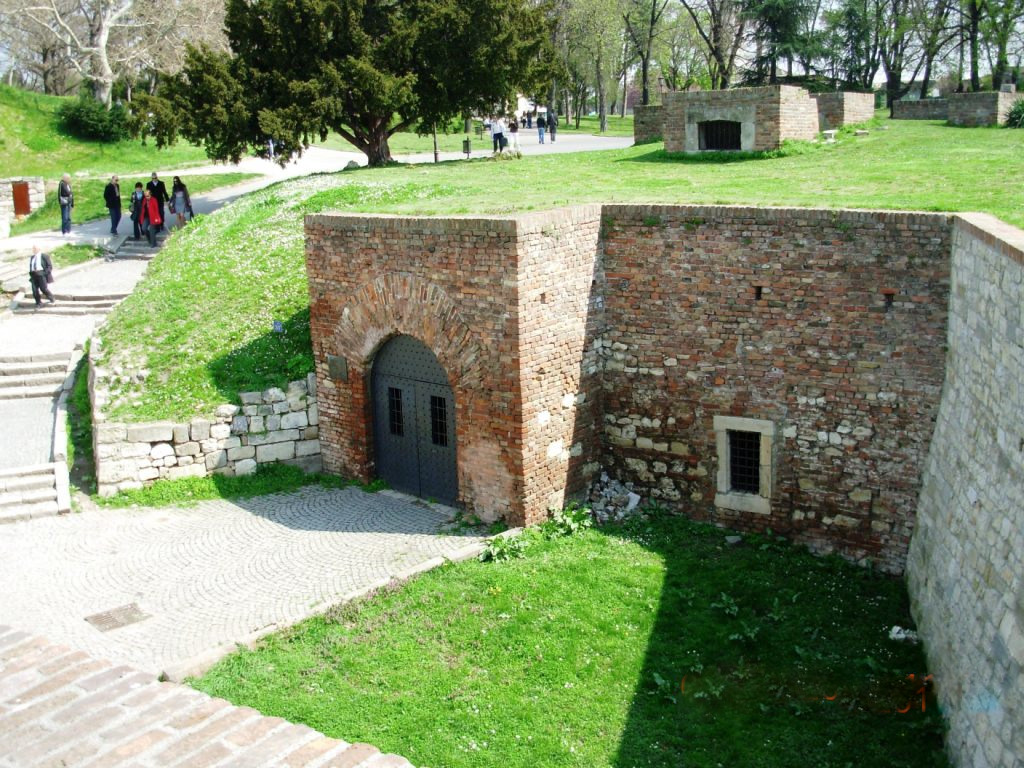
Entrance to the Roman well

After the Austrians occupied the northern Serbia in 1717, it was obvious that there is a problem of providing water for the city within the fortress. Main sources were two large rivers, Danube and Sava, but as Belgrade was quite often under siege or a battleground, it wasn't practical as the rivers would become unreachable during the sieges so they searched for an alternative. Within the scopes of a massive construction and reconstruction of Belgrade in the Baroque manner, from 1717 to 1731 a present facility was dug and a complex wooden mechanism was installed to lift the water up from the pit of 50 m (160 ft). It was designed by Balthasar Neumann. Austrians originally intended to dig a proper water well. They descended to 54 m (177 ft), which is below the water level in the Sava, but found no water and actually hit the impervious rock layer. Then they decided to adapt it into the cistern and to conduct all surface water into it.

The mechanism was manually operated, worked on the lever principle and had 12 segments, or pistons, which all worked at the same time when operated. Water was then "climbing", being poured from one vessel into another. Being made of wood, it either rotted away completely or was burned in the subsequent battles, but sometimes it is mentioned as the beginning of the "industrial period" in Belgrade. The copy of the schematics is still being kept in the library of the Matica Srpska in Novi Sad. Neumann also constructed a double spiral staircase which descends 35 m (115 ft) down the shaft and based it on the staircase in the Saint Peter Well in Orvieto, Italy, in 1527 by Antonio da Sangallo the Younger. The diameter of the shaft is 3.4 m (11 ft). The staircase has 212 steps and there is a small corridor at the bottom which connects two sections of the staircase, but it is usually flooded. On Austrian maps, it is named the Great Well, but when Serbian rebels liberated Belgrade from the Ottomans in the early 19th century they gradually named it the Roman Well as the common belief at the time was that all old buildings were Roman.

In 1940 the Yugoslav Royal Army emptied the well, measured it and cleaned it. Because of that, during the World War II an urban myth spread through Belgrade claiming that the gold from the National bank of the Kingdom of Yugoslavia was hidden in the well. German occupation forces sent three divers to check the bottom of the well, but all three disappeared. Some of the Yugoslav soldiers apparently carved a number "1940" near the bottom of the well.

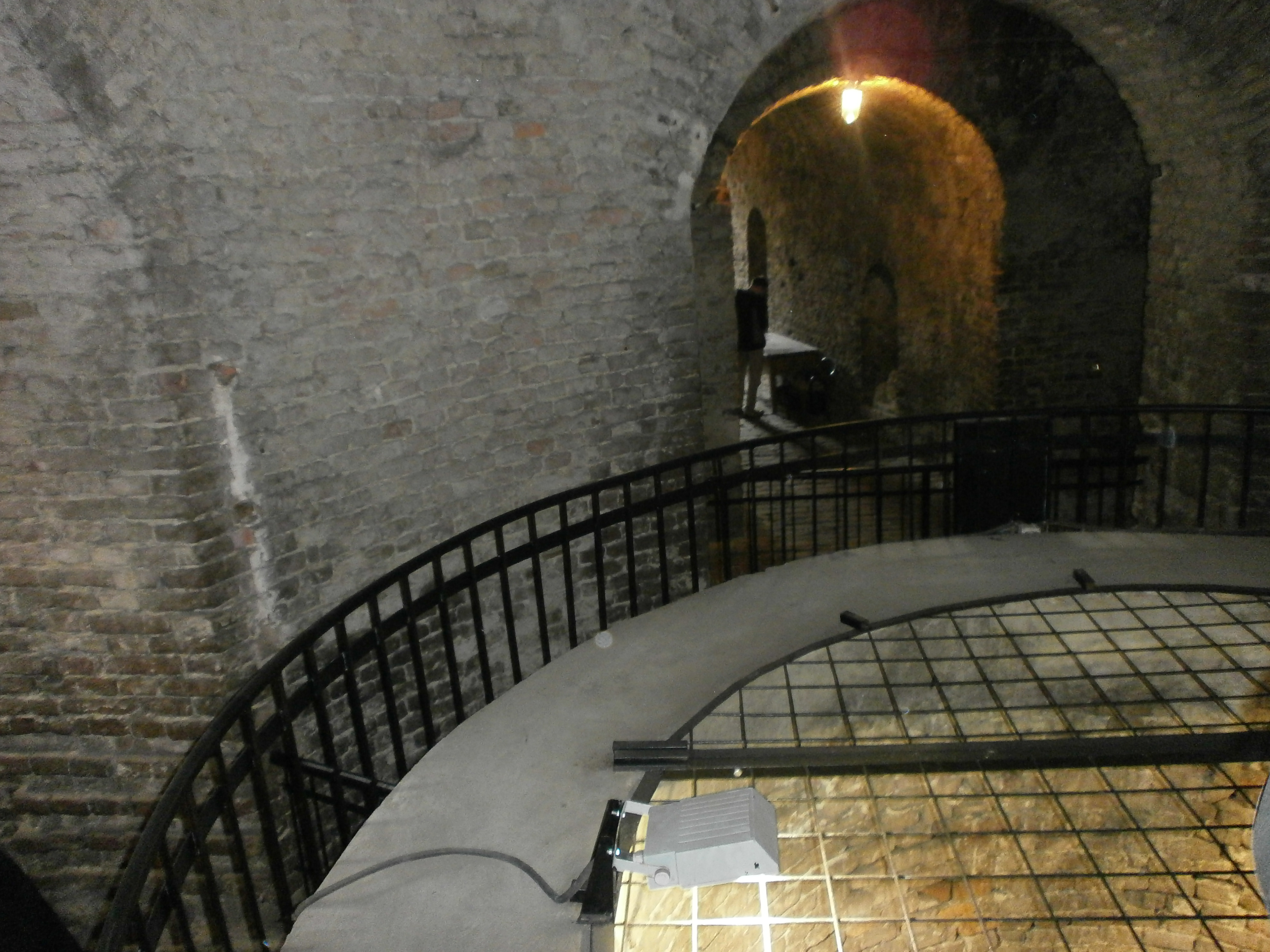
Roman well

In 1954 a man threw his mistress into the well. Police wanted to prove that he killed her so the divers were dispatched to find the body, but they failed. Still, her body resurfaced ten days later. This story served as an inspiration for Dušan Makavejev when he wrote and directed the movie Love Affair, or the Case of the Missing Switchboard Operator in 1967. In 1964 Alfred Hitchcock visited the well and praised the "ambience". In 1967–1968, new exploration of the object was conducted. The divers discovered that the bottom is full of sludge and retrieved a number of skeletons, several animal ones and two human. In 1987 the divers explored whether there is a connection between the well and the Sava, but found no tunnel. The bottom was flat, there was one park bench in the water and a huge number of coins. The Roman Well served as an inspiration for another movie Lavirint, which was nominated by Serbia for an Oscar in 2002. During the 2006 dive, a miniature, 5 mm (0.20 in) long amphipoda, previously undiscovered in Serbia, was found. It was closed in 2007, reconstructed and reopened in March 2014, but as of 2017 the upper section is open for visitors while the descent is forbidden due to the safety reasons.

Divers explored it again in November 2017. The bottom wasn't flat anymore as the bench and coins were covered with a thick layer of some 15 m^{3} (530 cu ft) of construction waste, iron bars, reflector lights, wired trash bins, etc., which all made the well 1.5 m (4 ft 11 in) shallower. Cans, plastic bottles and lids were floating on the water, while a pile of new coins formed. The divers suggested that the well should be cleaned at least once a year. Still, the water was unusually clear, with artificial reflector light it was transparent all the way to the bottom, or 14 m (46 ft) and had a temperature of 12 °C (54 °F). After 300 years, speleothems began to form near the bottom of the well.

The well remains one of the most "mysterious" and "freighting" structures in Belgrade. An entire mystical body of fringe stories developed around it, all including the idea that it is much older. From the claims that it existed during the despot Stefan Lazarević's rule, or actually during the Roman period itself, being built by the soldiers from the Legio IV Flavia Felix, to the claims that it is a "navel of the world" and descend in the Hades, used by Orpheus during his search for Euridice. While a structure called "bunar" was mentioned in some texts regarding the Lazarević period, it was actually a food storage. There are also tales of the well being connected with the network of lagums, underground corridors in Zemun, across the Sava. Since 2007, city began making and amending plans for well's reconstruction, even calling it a priority due to its bad shape, but as of 2023 it has not been renovated.

Existence of another water well, sort of a "twin" of the Roman well, is not widely known today. This well, built on the same principle and being about the same depth, is located away from the fortress, below the modern Monument to Vuk Karadžić in the Vukov Spomenik neighborhood.

==== Damad Ali Pasha's türbe (1784) ====
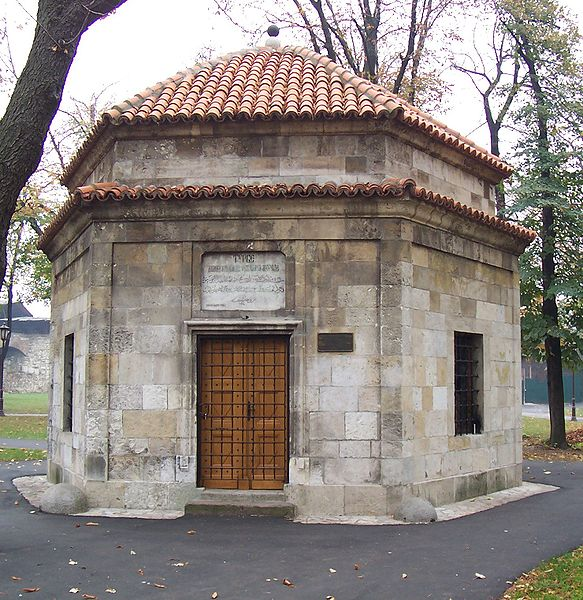
Damad Ali Pasha's türbe

The türbe is located on the central plateau of the Upper Town and is one of the few remaining monuments of Islamic architecture in Belgrade. It was named after Damad Ali Pasha, a Grand Vizier of the Ottoman Empire 1713–16, during the reign of Sultan Ahmed III. The mausoleum, however, is younger. It was built in 1784 over the grave of Izzet Mehmed Pasha, another Grand Vizier and a muhafiz, or governor, of Belgrade. The türbe was badly damaged during the First Serbian Uprising, so the Ottoman governor of Serbia, Marashli Ali Pasha, reconstructed it in 1818–19 and dedicated it to Damad Ali Pasha. Another two muhafiz, this time administering only the fortress as Serbia gained autonomy, were buried in the türbe: Selim Sirri Pasha in 1847 and Hasan Pasha in 1850.

The mausoleum is made of stone, with a regular hexagonal base. The sides are 4 m (13 ft) long, it is 7 m (23 ft) tall with a diameter of 8 m (26 ft). A thorough renovation began in May 2017 and should be finished by October. The wiring and the roof are replaced, the floor was drained and the inner and outer conservation was done. Old roof tiles were broken so the water poured inside. The roof tiles, which were not the original roof cover, were replaced with the lead cover and new, modern roof tiles, rotten wooden floor was replaced with the brick slabs and the wooden covering of the tomb was also replaced.

==== Museum of Natural History (1830s-1840s) ====
The venue is located on the Great Ravelin. It was built in the 1830s or the 1840s. It originally served to house Ottoman guardsmen, so it is not a spacious object, covering 100 m^{2} (1,100 sq ft). In 1957, the Museum of Forestry and Hunting was relocated from the Residence of Prince Miloš in Topčider into the building. In 1973, the museum was annexed to the Museum of Natural History. After the Museum of Forestry and Hunting was officially abolished in 1994, the building became a gallery of the Museum of Natural History. It has 35,000 visitors yearly.

==== Institute for the Protection of Cultural Monuments (1904) ====
The original building was built from 1902 to 1904, to serve as the headquarters of the Serbian General Staff. It was demolished during the Austro-Hungarian bombing of Belgrade across the Sava in October 1915. It was decided to build the new headquarters on the same location. In the post-war situation, when funds were low and urgency was needed to repair the damages, it was decided to erect two temporary structures. One building was constructed on the location of the First Southwest Rampart's bastion, while the other one was built on the foundations of the 1904 building.

The rebuilt building was designed by Janko Šafarik, in the typical manner of 19th-century Serbian urban architecture. Facade and surrounding features include socle made of natural stone, side staircase of artificial stone, and fence and candelabra made of cast iron. When the general staff was moved into the new building in the Kneza Miloša Street in 1928, the building in the fortress was turned into the Military museum. In 1956, the museum was relocated to the nearby, much larger building of the Military and Geography Institute, the auxiliary building on the rampart was demolished, and the Institute for the Protection of Cultural Monuments moved into the remaining building in 1961. The building's facade was fully renovated in the fall of 2021.

==== Bunker (1948–1949) ====
In 1948, after the Informbiro resolution and the ensuing Tito–Stalin split, a construction of the defensive bunker began on the fortress. In the process, the 5 m (16 ft) thick rampart of the original Nebojša Tower was discovered. It was destroyed and by 1949 the bunker which covers 200 m^{2} (2,200 sq ft) was finished. The tallest point of the bunker is the cannon dome which was used for the artillery and military units. Abandoned later, it was adapted for the tourists and opened in December 2012. It has parts of the authentic inventory from the 1950s: safety doors, beds, ventilation, water tanks, etc.

==== Basketball monument (2018) ====
On 12 December 2018, a monument officially called "Monument to the Founding Fathers of Serbian and Yugoslav Basketball School" was dedicated. The date was symbolic, as it also marked 95 years since the first basketball arrived in Serbia and 70 years since the founding of the basketball association. The monument is located in a small park area between the basketball courts of "Partizan" and "Crvena Zvezda".

As written on the inscription, the monument is dedicated to the members of the Yugoslavia national basketball team which qualified for the 1950 FIBA World Championship in Argentina. Four players from this team became members of the FIBA Hall of Fame: Nebojša Popović, Aleksandar Nikolić, Radomir Šaper and Borislav Stanković. The sculpture was built on the initiative of the former basketball player Nataša Kovačević. The monument was designed by sculptor Radoš Radenković, symbolizes "fight for global affirmation" and represents three stylized arms reaching for a basketball.

=== Great Kalemegdan Park ===
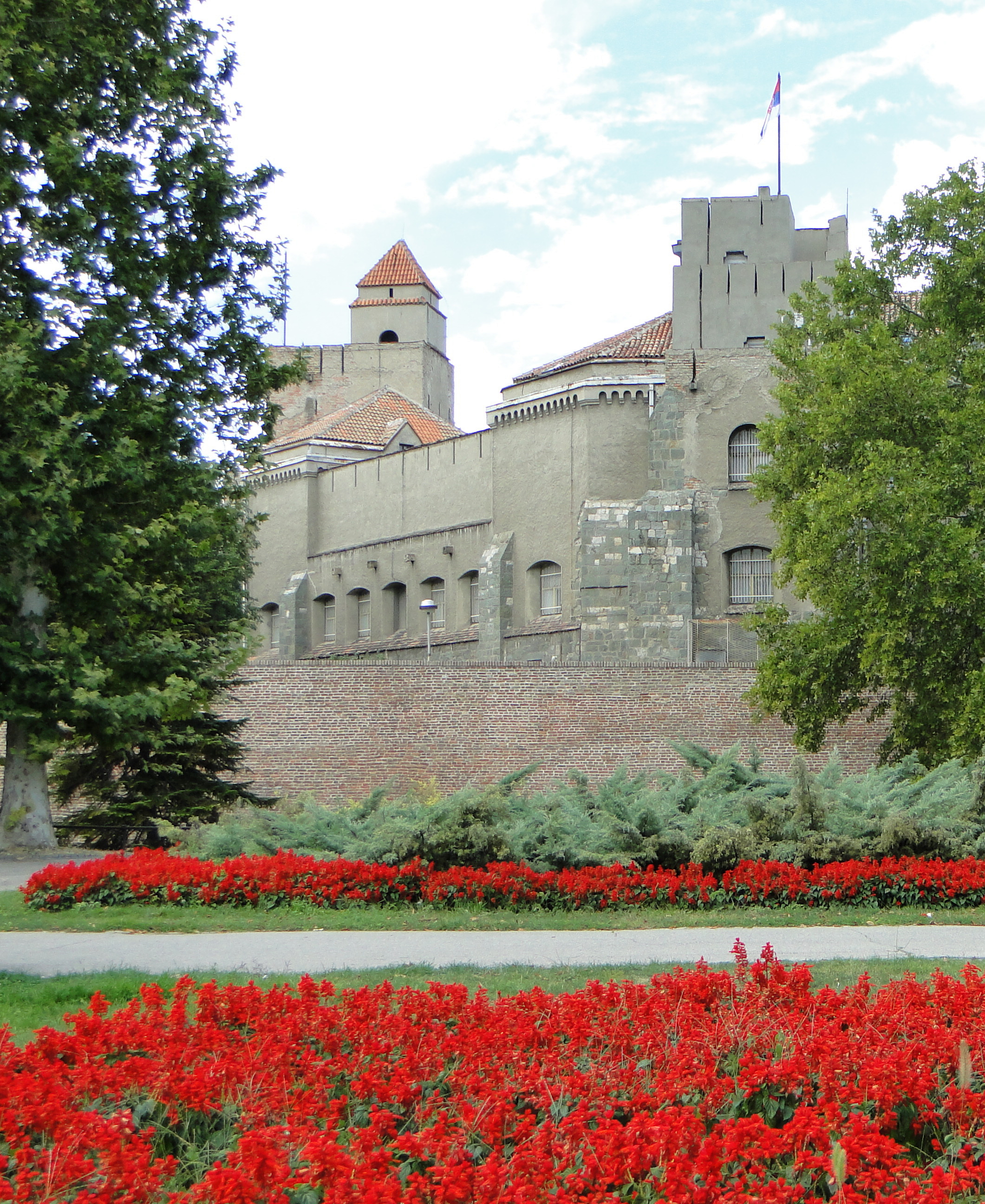
Military Museum

Veliki Kalemegdanski park (Велики Калемегдански парк) occupies the southern corner of fortress, with geometrical promenades, the Military Museum, the Museum of Forestry and Hunting, and the Monument of Gratitude to France. At the location of the Monument of Gratitude to France there was a monument to Karađorđe which was dedicated on 21 August 1913, a work of Paško Vučetić. There was a relief with various figures on the sides of the pedestal and Karađorđe's grandson, king Peter I of Serbia attended the dedication. During the Austro-Hungarian occupation of Belgrade in World War I, the Austrians planned to erect the bronze monument to their emperor, Franz Joseph I on that very spot so they melted the Karađorđe's monument to reuse the bronze. When the Franz Joseph monument was being shipped to Belgrade in 1918, Serbian forces captured the ship and confiscated the statue. It was later melted into three church bells, largest of which still tolls from the belltower of the Ružica Church today.

==== Gondola lift ====
In August 2017 the construction of the gondola lift, which would connect Kalemegdan with Ušće was announced by the city government for 2018. Construction was confirmed in March 2018 when the idea of a pedestrian bridge was dropped after it has been described as "complicated" and "unstable". On the Kalemegdan side, the station will be dug into the hill, 1m (3 ft 3in) below the fortress' Sava Promenade. There is a cave 7 m (23 ft) below the projected station, so there is a possibility that the cave will be adapted for visitations and connected to the future gondola station by an elevator. On the Ušćе side, the starting point will be next to the Skate Park, across the Ušće Tower. The entire route is 1 km (0.62 mi) long, of which 300 m (980 ft) will be above the Sava river itself. Estimated cost is €10 million and duration of works 18 months. Already existing criticism of the project continued, from the officially used name (gondola instead of a traditional Serbian žičara) and chosen location, to the route, especially the Kalemegdan station which is a collapsible locality above the cave, in the area already prone to mass wasting. Park of the Non-Aligned Countries in the neighborhood of Kosančićev Venac was proposed as the better solution.

Cutting of 47 trees in the park, because of the gondola lift began in March 2019. The pine trees were 50 to 60 years old. With an enlarged price of €15 million and unified opposition to the project by the environmentalists, architects and urbanists, with additional cutting of over 100 trees in Ušće park across the river, this prompted popular protests. Citizens organized and as the city was cutting the trees, they were planting new seedlings. Drilling also began and it was announced that the stone wall will be partially demolished, too. Municipality of Stari Grad also organized protests, demolishing fences on the construction site, filing complaints and fines against city and government officials and announcing 24-hours watch on site and demolition of any structure built in the meantime. Construction of the gondola lift is prohibited by the current Belgrade's General Regulatory Plan from 2016 which stipulates that construction of the "cables for the alternative transportation and recreation" is forbidden in the area of the Belgrade Fortress.

In March 2020, Belgrade Fortress was voted one of the Europe's 7 most endangered heritage sites by the pan-European cultural heritage organization Europa Nostra, specifically due to the planned construction of the gondola lift.

=== Little Kalemegdan Park ===
Mali Kalemegdanski park (Мали Калемегдански парк) occupies the area in the eastern section, which borders the urban section of Belgrade. The northern section of Little Kalemegdan Park is occupied by the Belgrade zoo, opened in 1936. The Cvijeta Zuzorić Art Pavilion is also located here.

== Overview ==
Kalemegdan is the most popular park among Belgraders and for many tourists visiting Belgrade because of the park's numerous winding walking paths, shaded benches, picturesque fountains, statues, historical architecture and scenic river views (Sahat kula – the clock tower; closed in 2007 for the reconstruction, reopened in April 2014, Zindan kapija – Zindan gate, etc.). The former canal which was used for city supplying in the Middle Ages is completely covered by earth but the idea of recreating it resurfaced in the early 2000s. Belgrade Fortress is known for its kilometers-long tunnels, underground corridors and catacombs, which are still largely unexplored. In the true sense, fortress is today the green oasis in the Belgrade's urban area.

As a combination of several habitats (parkland with old trees, fortress, landscape view of rivers and forested Veliko Ratno Ostrvo), Kalemegdan may be interesting for overseas tourists-birdwatchers as it provides a snapshot of local bird fauna. It is also important as the resting spot for small passerine birds on migration, before or after crossing the rivers Sava and Danube. Kalemegdan has its own eBird hotspot and associated webpage at Kalemegdan Hotspot

The Belgrade Race Through History, an annual 6 km footrace, takes place in the park and fortress as a way of highlighting the history and culture of the area.

The Belgrade Fortress was nominated by the Serbian government for the UNESCO's World Heritage Site. Architects and urbanists think that possible inclusion on the list will protect the fortress from "aggressive transitional construction". In that case, the outlines of the fortress and a panoramic view on it will have to be preserved. The perceived visual pollution encompasses several objects. A gigantic object, a late 2000s project by the Zaha Hadid's studio, on the northern side of the fortress, down the slope of Danube. The project, despite some preparatory works, still didn't start off. The other was the spiral project "Cloud" by Sou Fujimoto, which was to connect the Sava port to the fortress, but the project was scrapped after 2013 when the mayoral tenure of Đilas ended. The third project is controversial Belgrade Waterfront project.

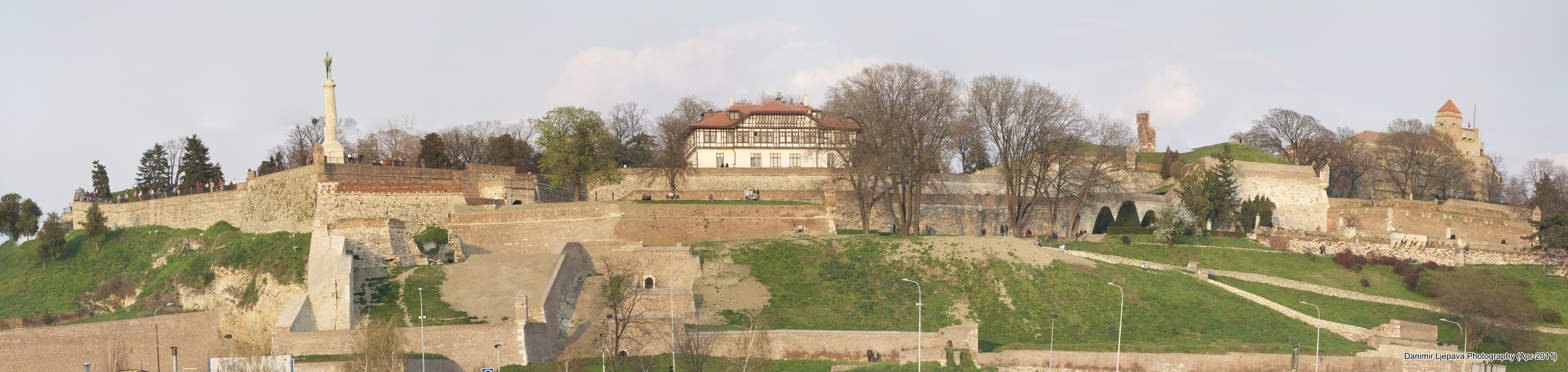
Walls of Belgrade Fortress—panoramic view from the river

The fortress in general functions as a major archaeological, artistic and historical treasury. As of 2014 it comprised:

- 19 memorial busts of important people from Serbian history, science and arts (Jovan Skerlić, Miloš Crnjanski, Jovan Dučić, Đura Daničić, Stevan Mokranjac
- 18 registered archaeological digs (horseshoe towers, remnants of the Metropolitan's palace, Roman Castrum, building of the main guards)
- 6 monuments and memorials (Pobednik, Monument of Gratitude to France, Despot Stefan Lazarević's Monument)
- 4 restaurants and coffee shops
- 4 sports terrains
- 3 sculptures ("Genius of death", "Tired fighter", "Partisan with children")
- 2 fountains ("Awakening", "Fisherman")
- 2 drinking fountains ("Japanese", "Mehmed Paša Sokolović")
- 2 churches (Ružica, Saint Petka)
- 2 galleries (of the Natural Museum, Inner Stambol Gate)
- 2 museums (Military Museum, Nebojša Tower)
- Cvijeta Zuzorić Art Pavilion, City Institute for the protection of the cultural monuments, Belgrade Planetarium, Luna Park, Belgrade Zoo, People's Observatory, Music Pavilion, Serbian Academy of Sciences and Arts' Archaeological Institute's Science and Research Center for the Fortress, Memorial Ossuary for the 1914–15 defenders of Belgrade
- Tomb of People's Heroes, containing the remains of the Communist party members and war heroes Ivan Milutinović, Đuro Đaković, Ivo Lola Ribar and Moša Pijade. The tomb was built for the first three in 1948, using the granite slabs intended for the construction of the Church of Saint Sava. Stevan Bodnarov sculptured their busts in 1949. After his death in 1957, Pijade was also buried in the tomb, and his bust, work of Slavoljub Stanković, was added in 1959. The complex was declared a cultural monument in 1983. Since the 1990s, the tomb has been frequently vandalized. After being vandalized three times in one year, members of organizations claiming Communist heritage organized citizens' watches to guard the tombs in December 2020, but desecrations continued in 2021 and 2022.

== Gallery ==
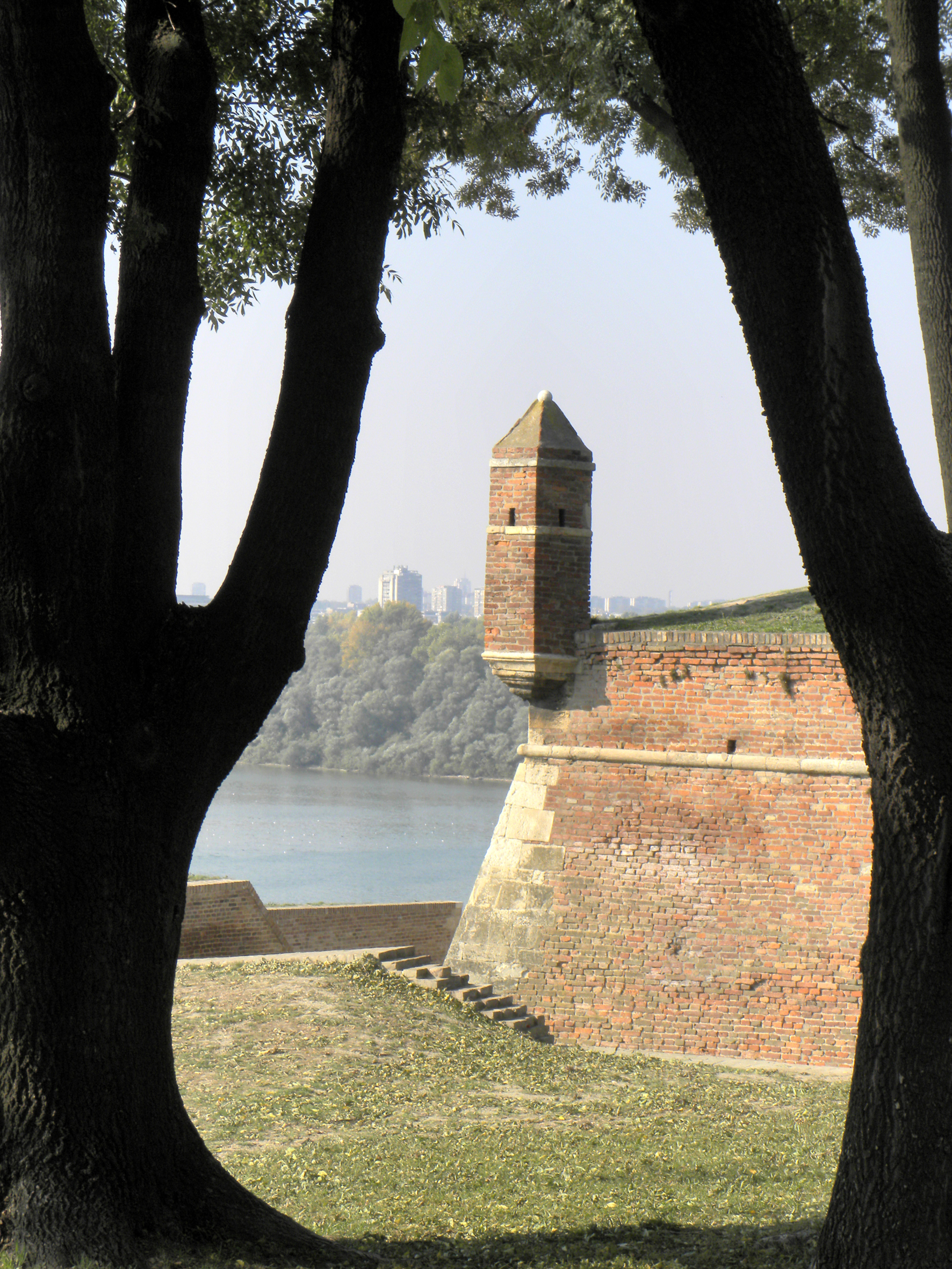

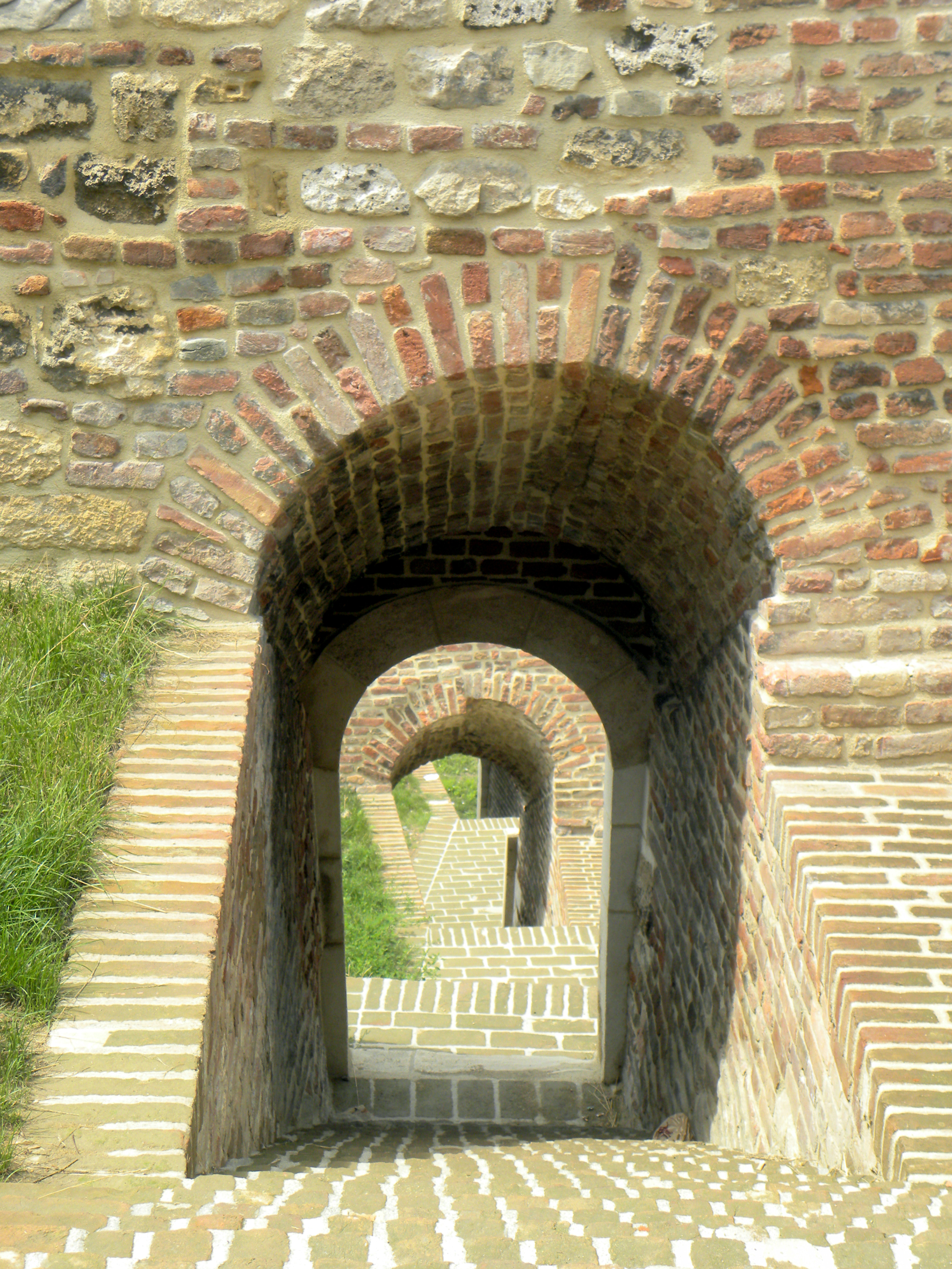

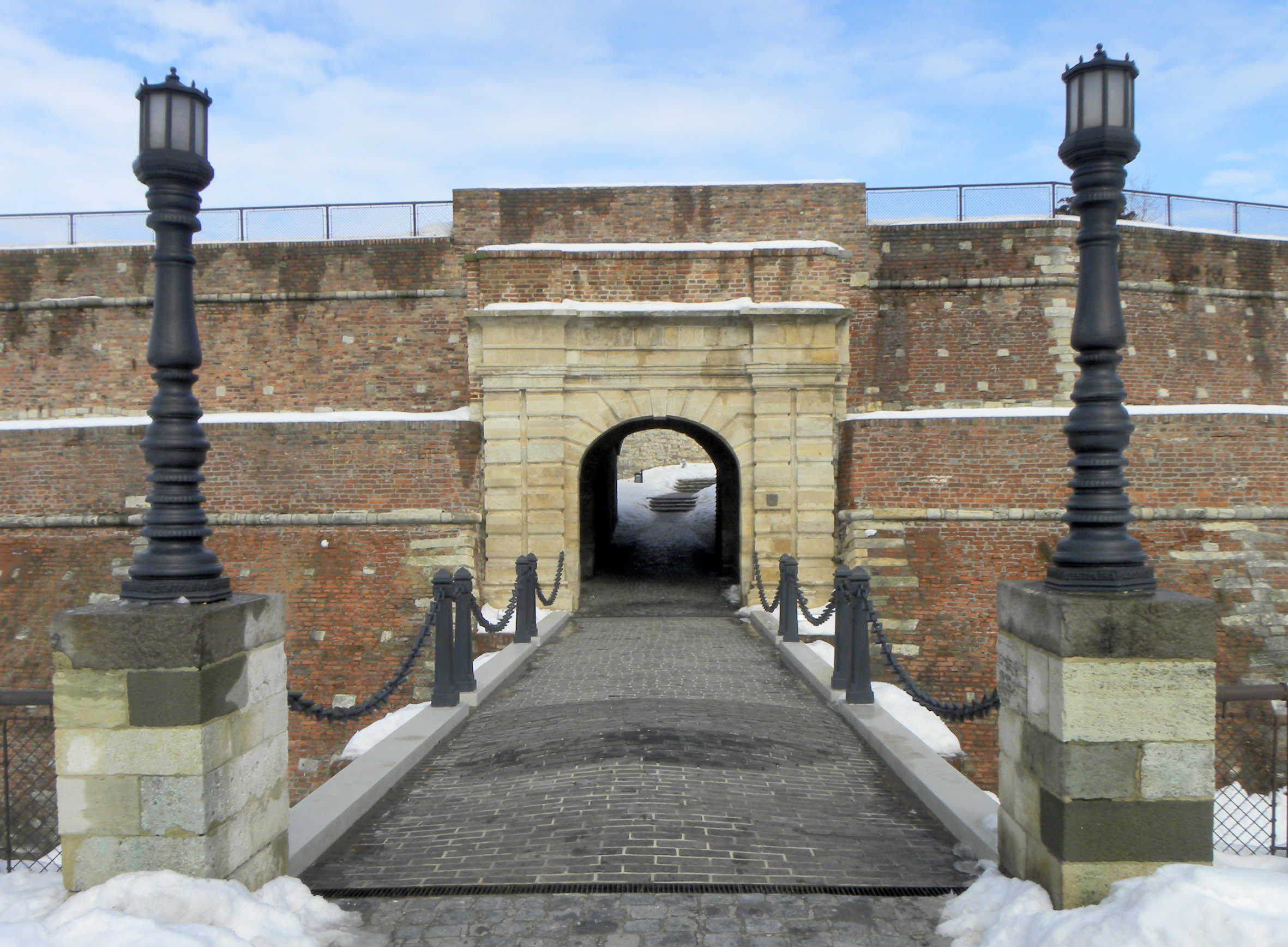

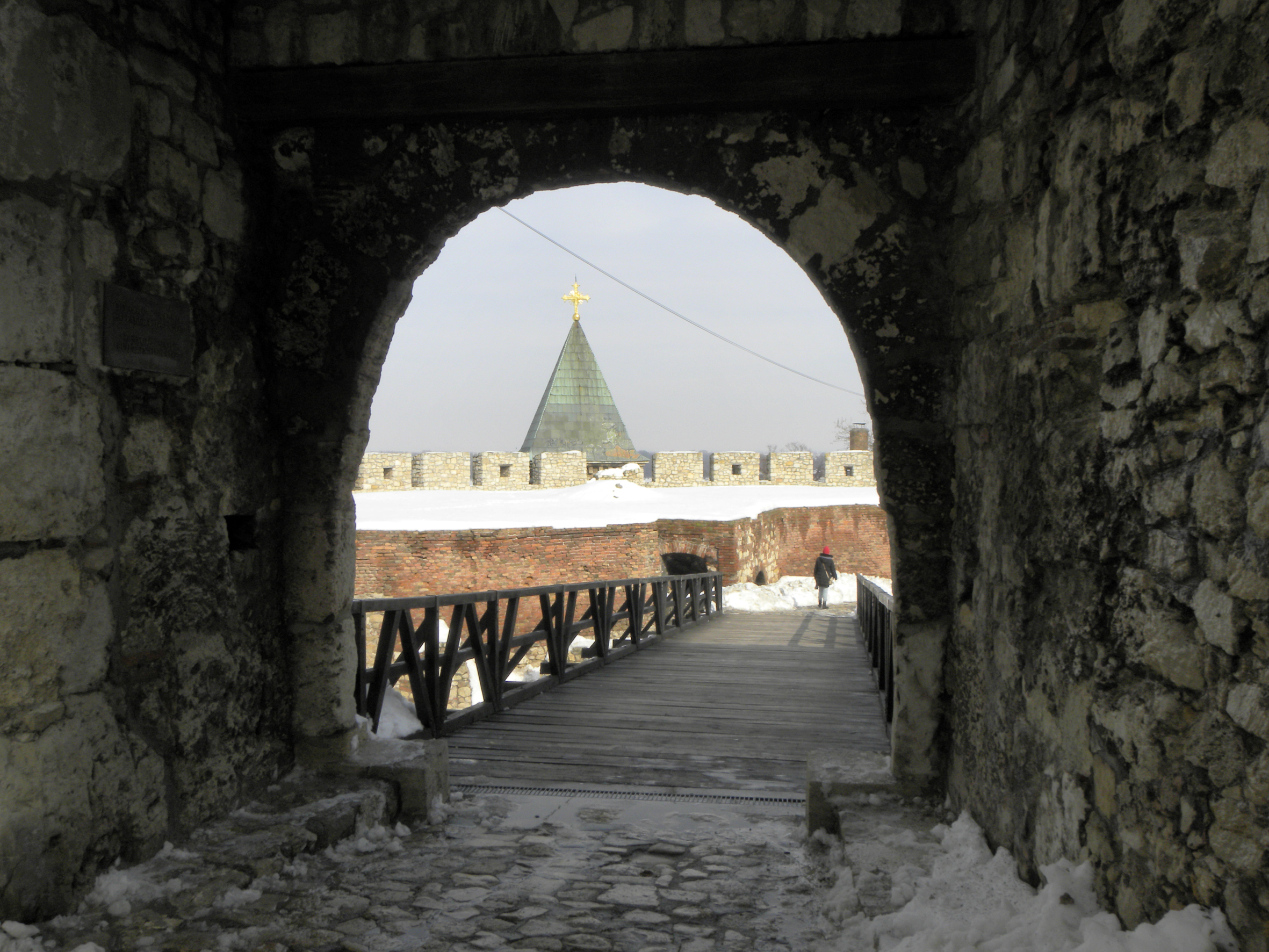

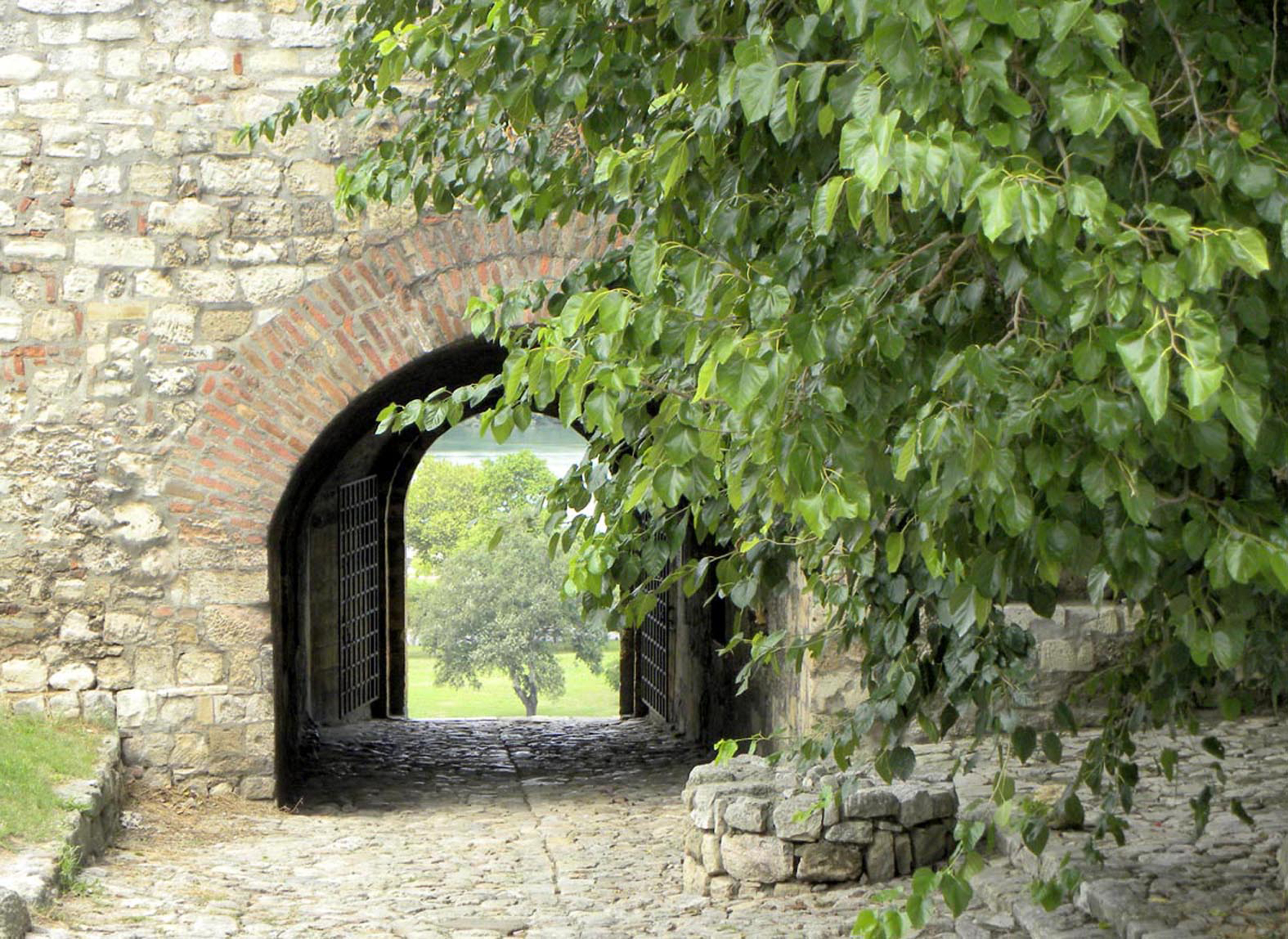

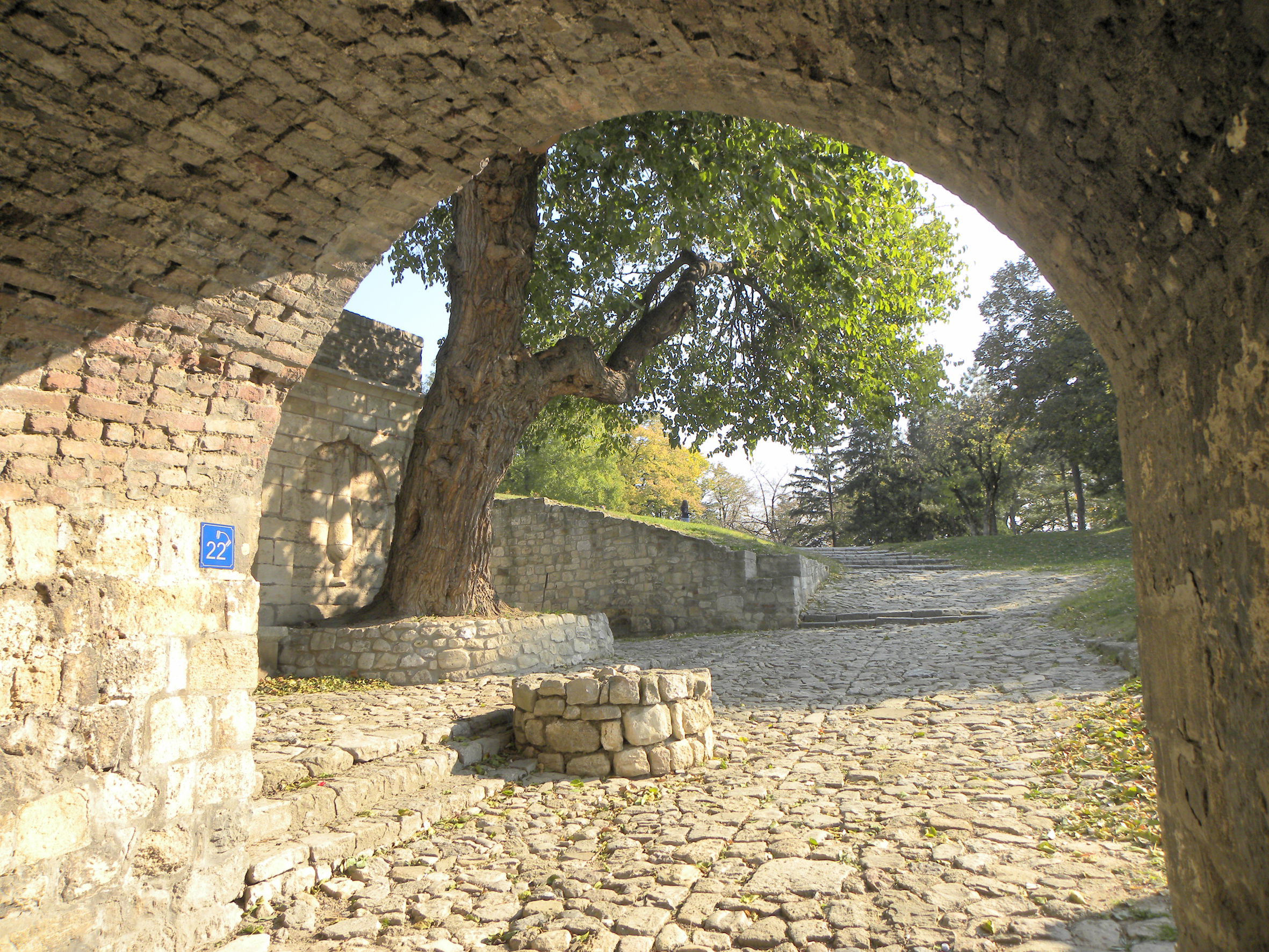

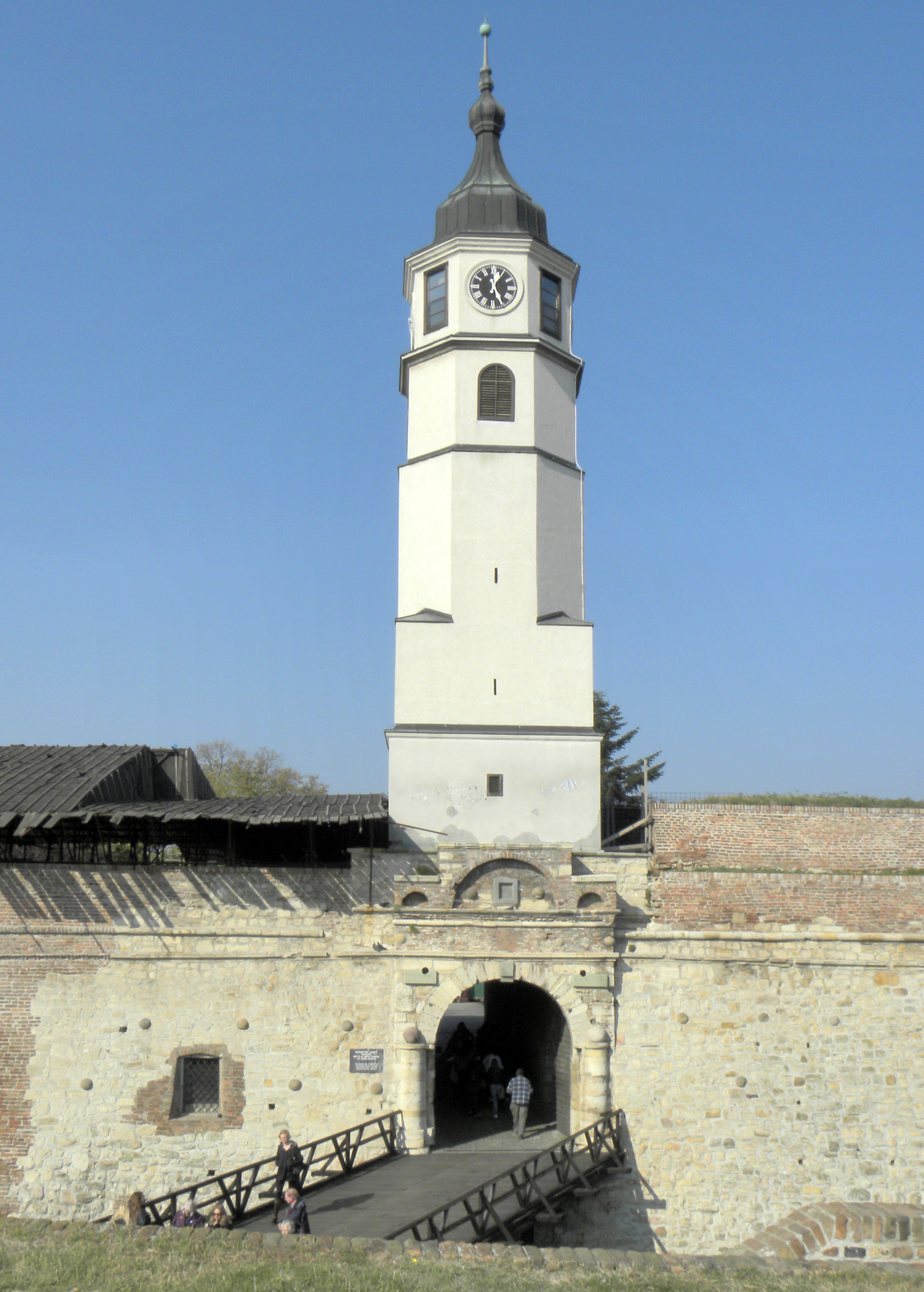

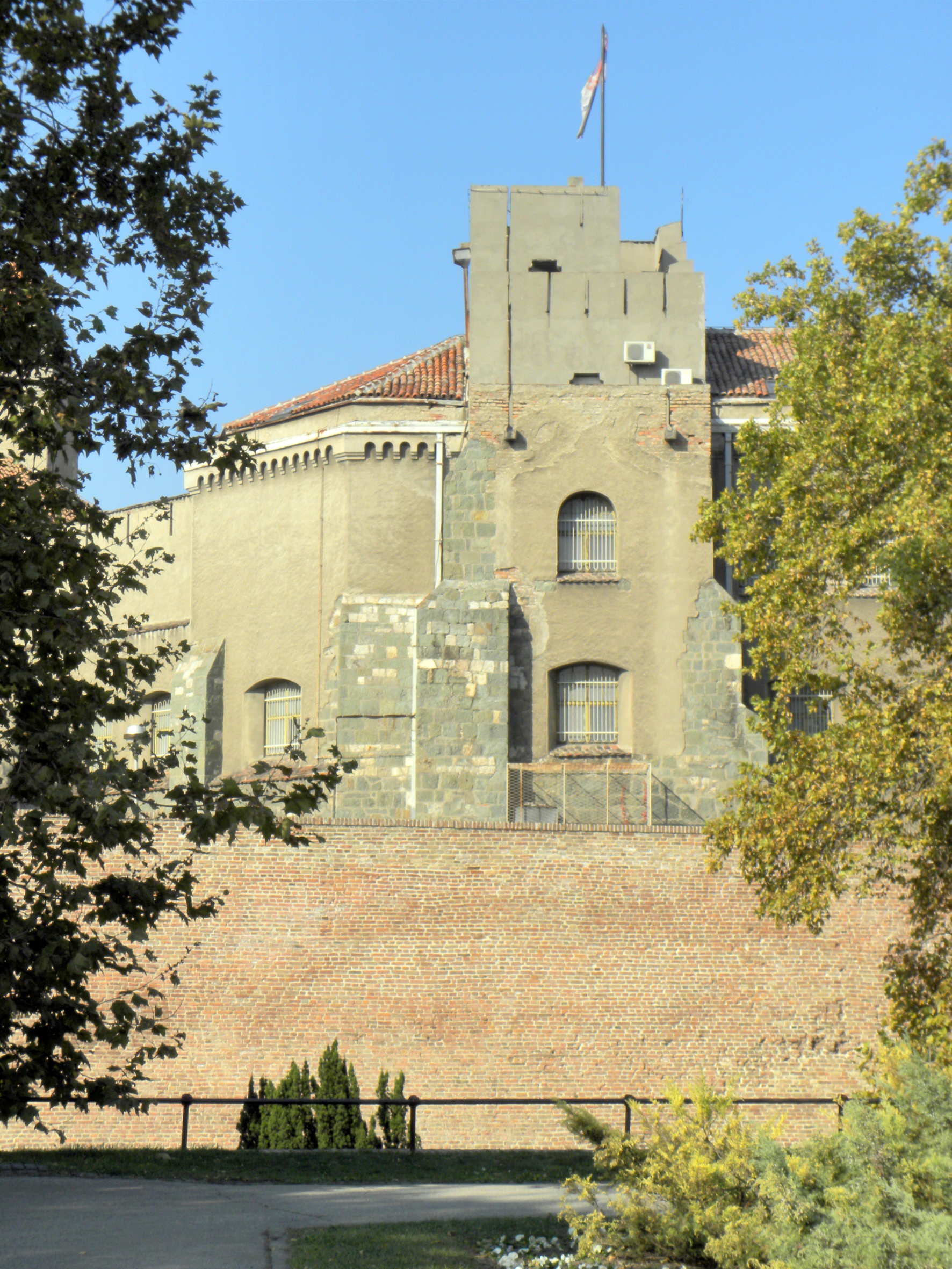

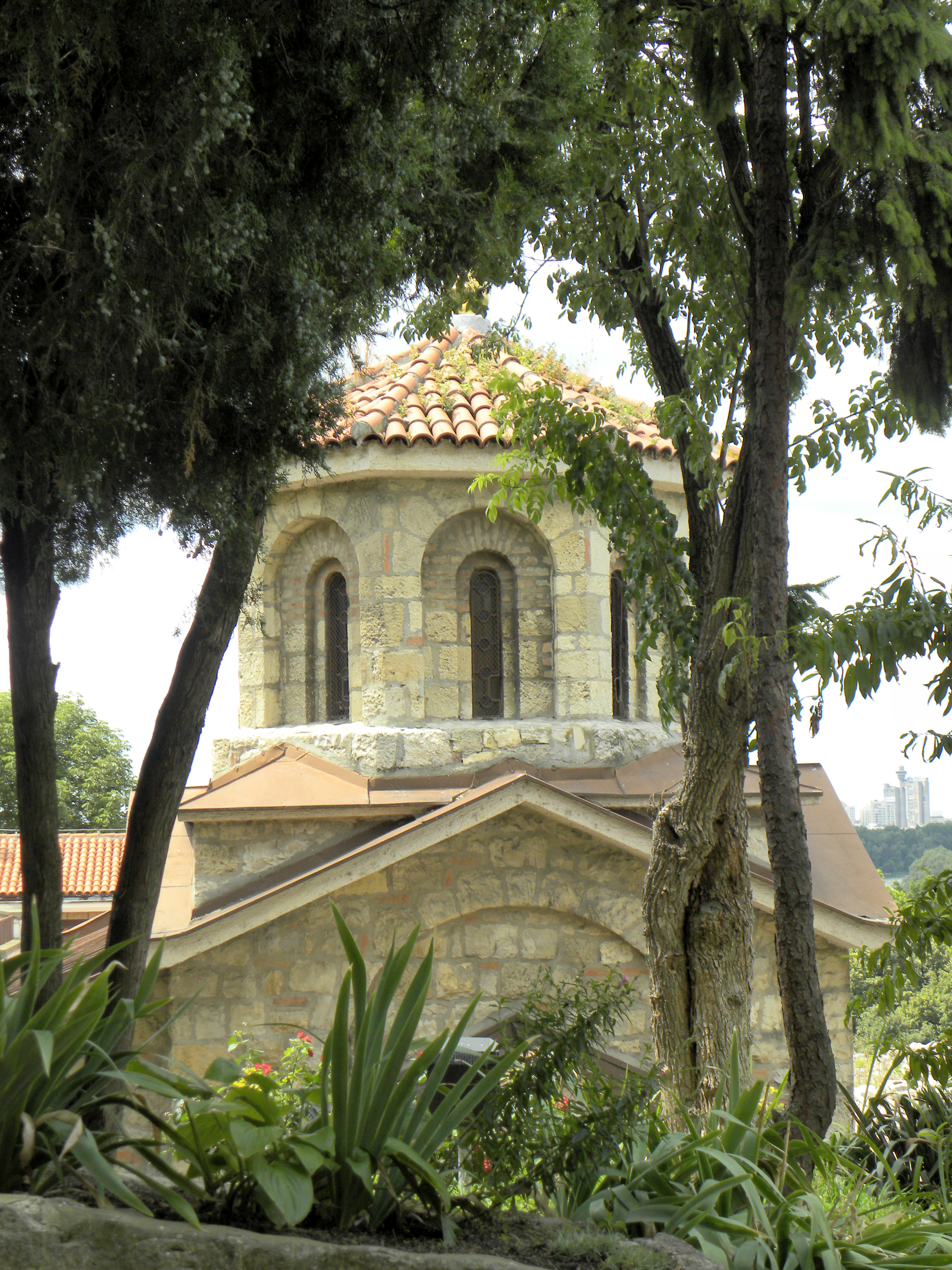

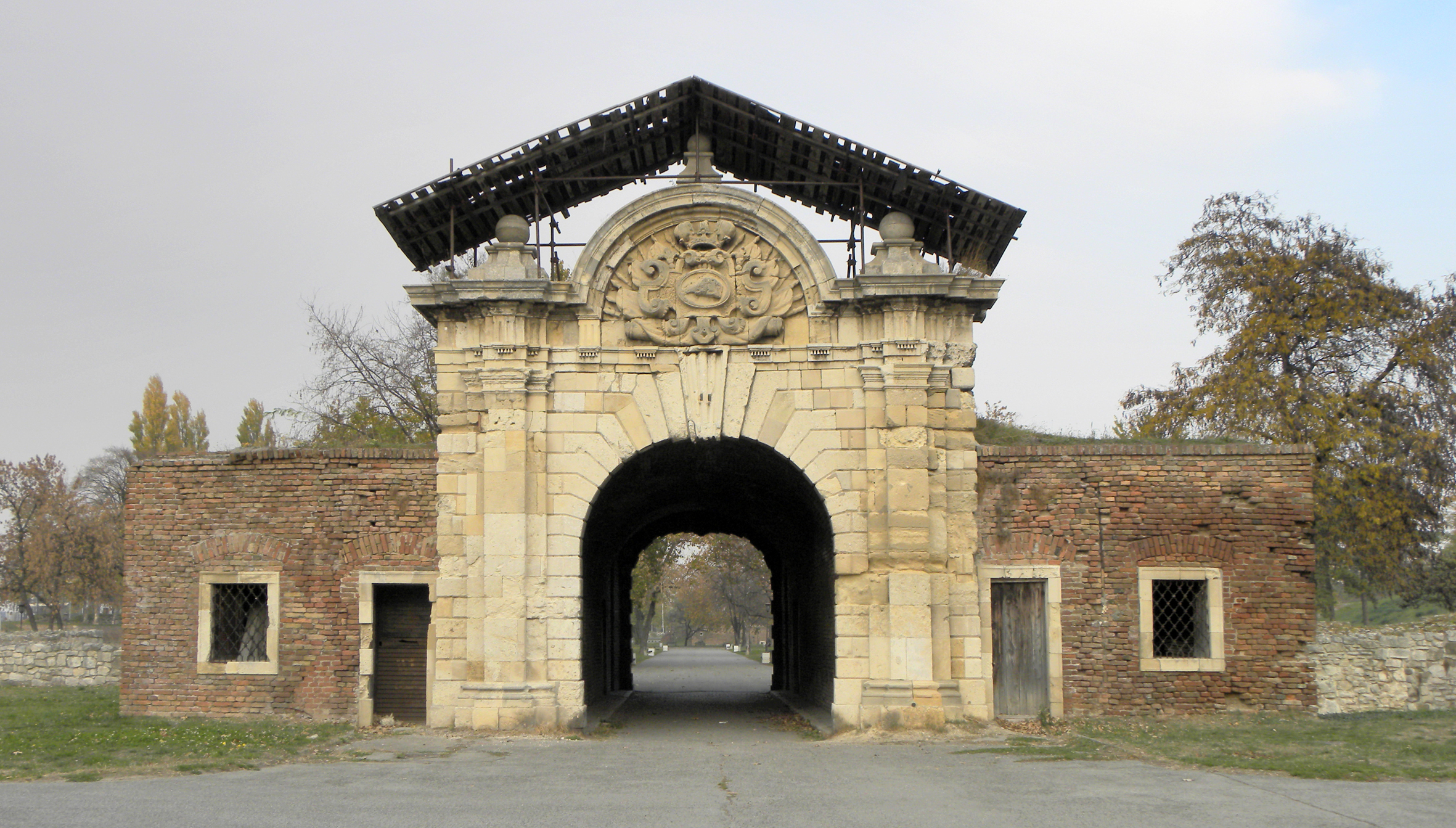

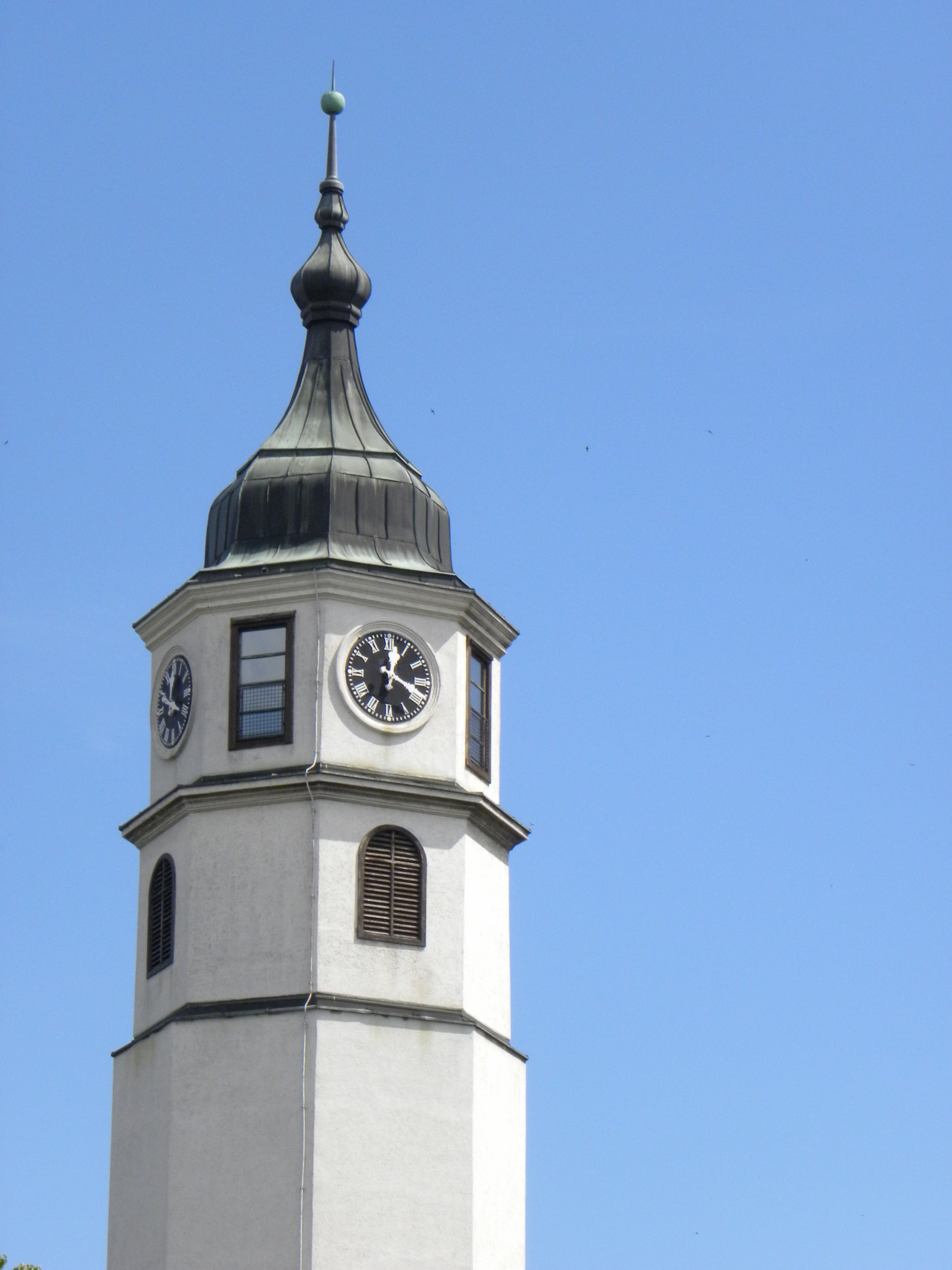

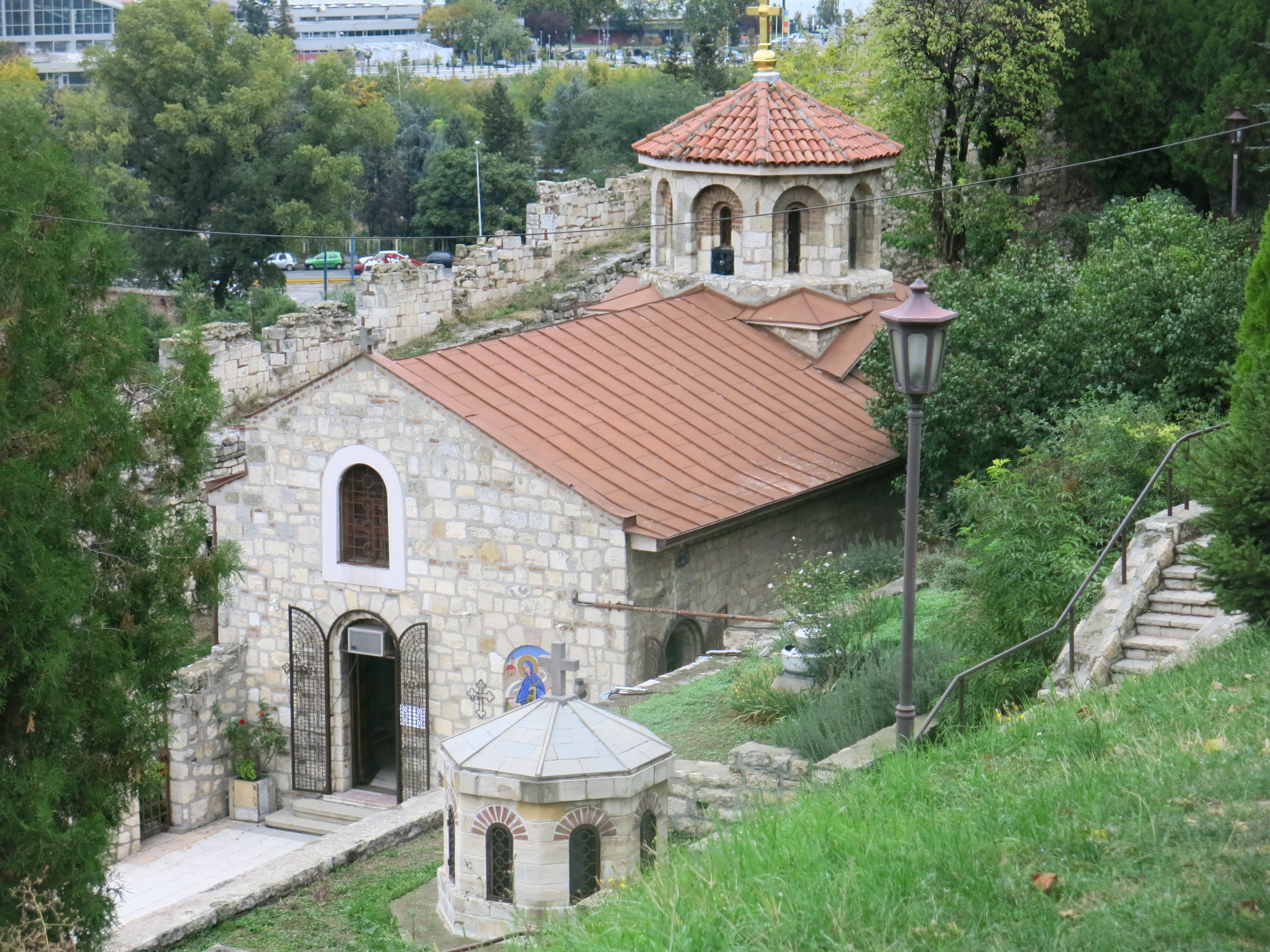

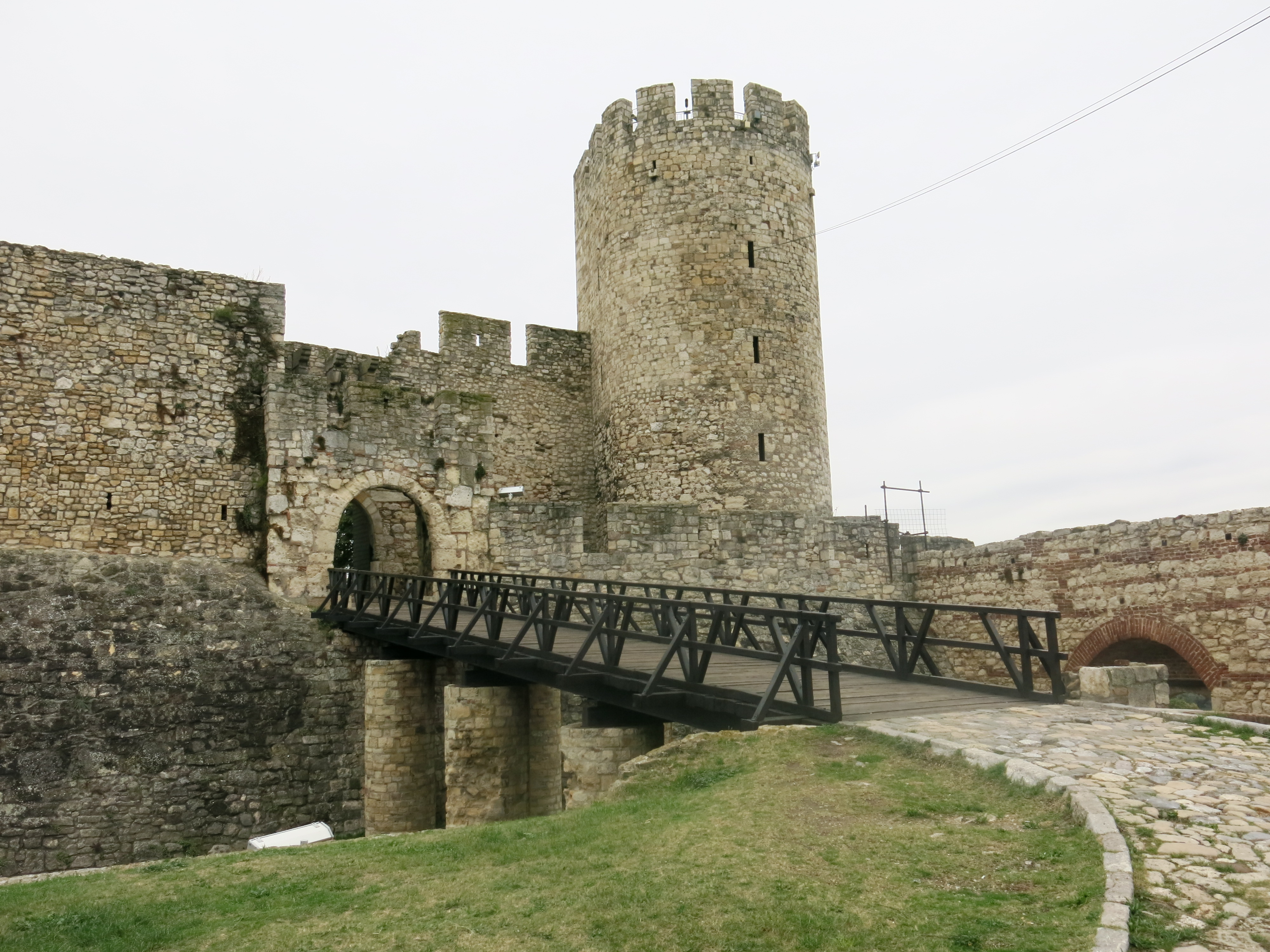

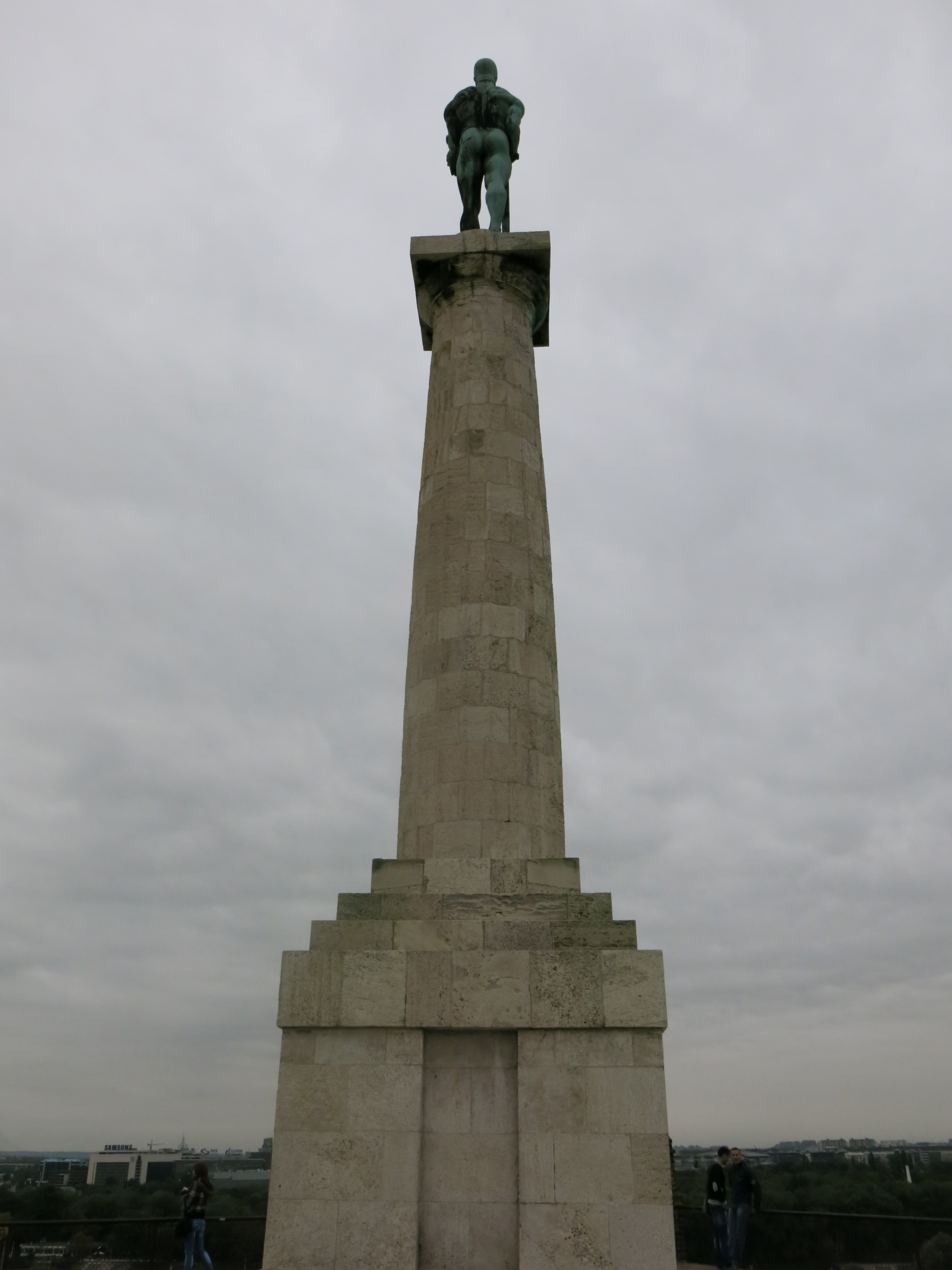

== See also ==
- Monument of Culture of Exceptional Importance
- Gates of Belgrade
- Tourism in Serbia
- Military Museum
- Ružica Church
- List of Ottoman military governors of Belgrade Fortress
