= Blank endorsement =

Endorsement of a negotiable instrument

Blank endorsement of a financial instrument, such as a cheque, is only a signature, not indicating the payee. The effect of this is that it is payable only to the bearer – legally, it transforms an order instrument ("pay to the order of (the payee)") into a bearer instrument ("pay to the bearer"). It is one of the types of endorsement of a negotiable instrument.

It is "an endorsement consisting of nothing but a signature and allowing any party in possession of the endorsed item to execute a claim."

A blank endorsement is a commonly known and accepted term in the legal and business worlds.

This is also called an endorsement in blank or blank endorsement.

The prevalent spelling in American English is endorsement; the minority convention, indorsement, is found in older American documents, although the revised Uniform Commercial Code Article on negotiable instruments retains the older spelling.

== See also ==
- Banking
- Bearer bond
- Blank cheque
- Draft
- Forged endorsement
- Promissory note
