= Blank cheque =

Metaphor for a vague agreement

A blank cheque or blank check in the literal sense is a cheque that has no monetary value written in, but is already signed. In the figurative sense, it is used to describe a situation in which an agreement has been made that is open-ended or vague, and therefore subject to abuse, or in which a party is willing to consider any expense in the pursuance of their goals. The term carte blanche (borrowed from French; lit. 'white card') is used in a similar way.

== Literal meaning ==
Cheque writers are advised to specify the amount of the cheque before signing it. A blank cheque can be extremely expensive for the drawer who writes the cheque, because whoever obtains the cheque could write in any amount of money, and might be able to cash it (if the current account or checking account contains sufficient funds, and depending on the laws in the specific country). Under American law, a blank cheque is an example of an "incomplete instrument" as defined in the Uniform Commercial Code's Article 3, Section 115 (a). Writing an amount in a blank cheque, without the authority of the signer, is an "alteration". It is legally equivalent to changing the numbers on a completed (non-blank) cheque.

== Metaphorical meaning ==
=== In finance ===
A "blank cheque company" refers to a company in development that has no specific business plan, such as a special-purpose acquisition company.

=== In politics ===
- On July 5, 1914, Germany gave Austria a "blank cheque" in handling its punishment of Serbia regarding the assassination of the heir to the Austrian throne. It led to the start of the First World War. German Chancellor Theobald von Bethmann Hollweg told the Austrian ambassador in Berlin that the Austrian Emperor had the support of the German Kaiser:
  Finally, as far as concerns Serbia, His Majesty, of course, cannot interfere in the dispute now going on between Austria- Hungary and that country, as it is a matter not within his competence. The Emperor Francis Joseph may, however, rest assured that His Majesty will faithfully stand by Austria-Hungary, as is required by the obligations of his alliance and of his ancient Alliance.
- In March 2003, Gordon Brown, the British Chancellor of the Exchequer, "effectively offered a blank cheque for war against Iraq", and would thus "'spend what it takes' to tackle Iraq's weapons of mass destruction".

=== In literature ===
Sir Arthur Conan Doyle used the term carte blanche in several of his Sherlock Holmes stories.

- "A Scandal in Bohemia":

"Then, as to money?"
"You have carte blanche."
"Absolutely?"
"I tell you that I would give one of the provinces of my kingdom to have that photograph."

- "The Adventure of the Beryl Coronet":

"I understand that you give me carte blanche to act for you, provided only that I get back the gems, and that you place no limit on the sum I may draw."
"I would give my fortune to have them back."

Dame Agatha Christie uses the term carte blanche in her first published book where she introduced Hercule Poirot to the reading public.

- "The Mysterious Affair at Styles" Chapter XII The Last Link:

"Madame, I have your permission to hold a little reunion in the salon? It is necessary for everyone to attend."
Mary smiled sadly.
"You know, Monsieur Poirot, that you have carte blanche in every way."
"You are too amiable, madame."

== See also ==
- Blank endorsement
- List of political metaphors
- Cheque#United States
- Blank Check (1994 movie)
- Tabula rasa
- The dictionary definition of carte blanche at Wiktionary
- Blank Check with Griffin and David (American film podcast)
