= Kamendin =

Coordinates: 44°52′24″N 20°19′45″E

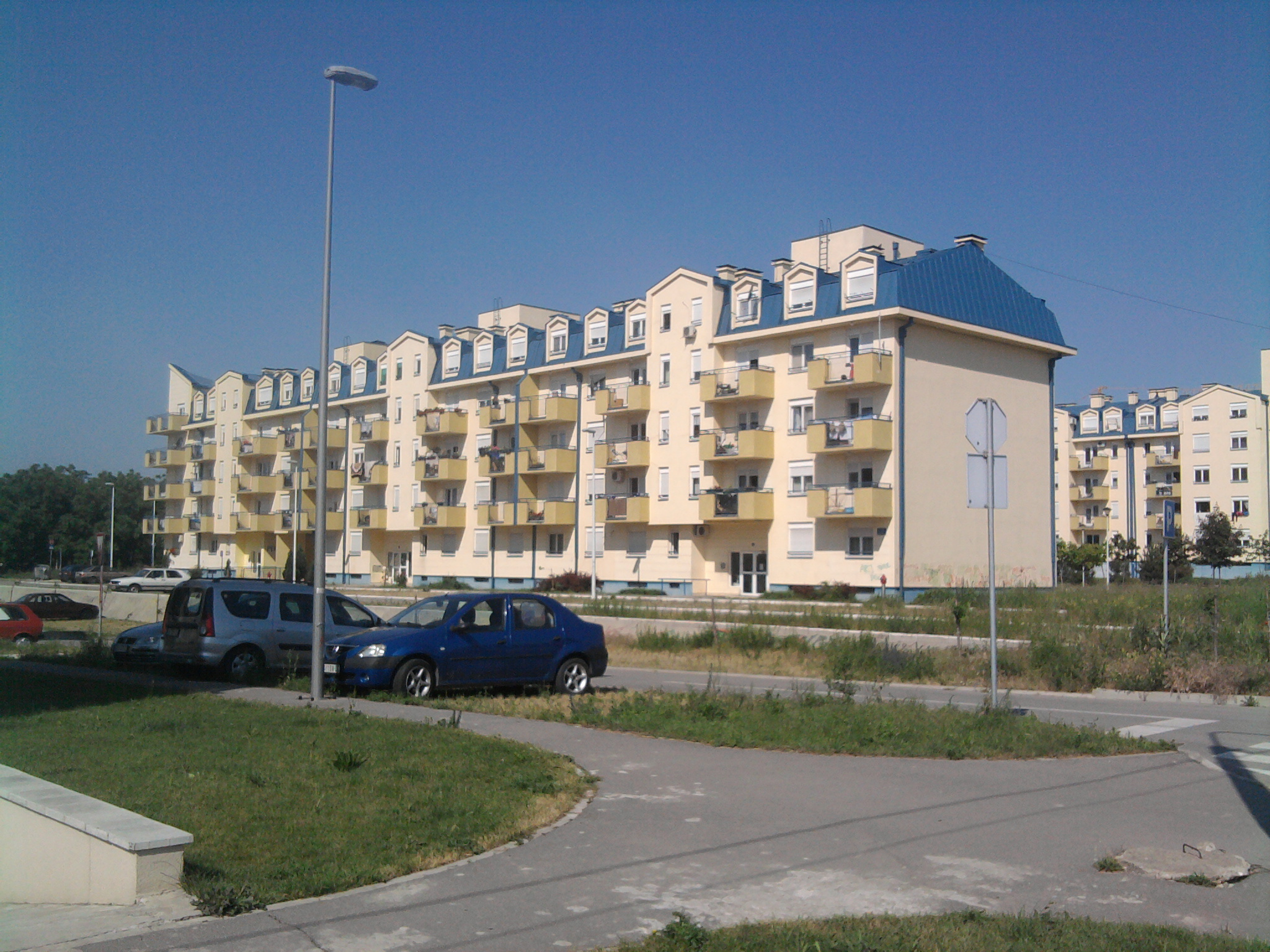
- Residential building in the neighbourhood
- Interactive map of Kamendin
- Country: Serbia
- District: City of Belgrade
- Municipality: Zemun
- Time zone: UTC+1 (CET)
  - Summer (DST): UTC+2 (CEST)

Kamendin (Serbian Cyrillic: Камендин) is an urban neighborhood of Belgrade, the capital of Serbia. It is located in Belgrade's municipality of Zemun, in the northwest section of Zemun. It is a part of Zemun Polje.

It extends to the north in the direction of Batajnica, while in the southeast it makes an urban connection in the direction of the Nova Galenika and Goveđi Brod industrial zones. The neighborhood was constructed in the 1990s and was intended as the eastern extension of Zemun Polje and the future urban connection of the urban Zemun and Batajnica. A residential area with short buildings, it has many so-called social dwellings, for refugees and displaced Romani families and is generally not considered an attractive location despite being one of the newest neighborhoods of Belgrade.

In November 2017 a construction of 270 new apartments for refugees from the Yugoslav wars began. The project's deadline was January 2019, when 800 people were expected to move into the new buildings.

== Sources ==
- "Kamendin". Novosti.
- "Kamendin". Novosti.
