= Dobanovci =

Dobanovci Добановци
- Town
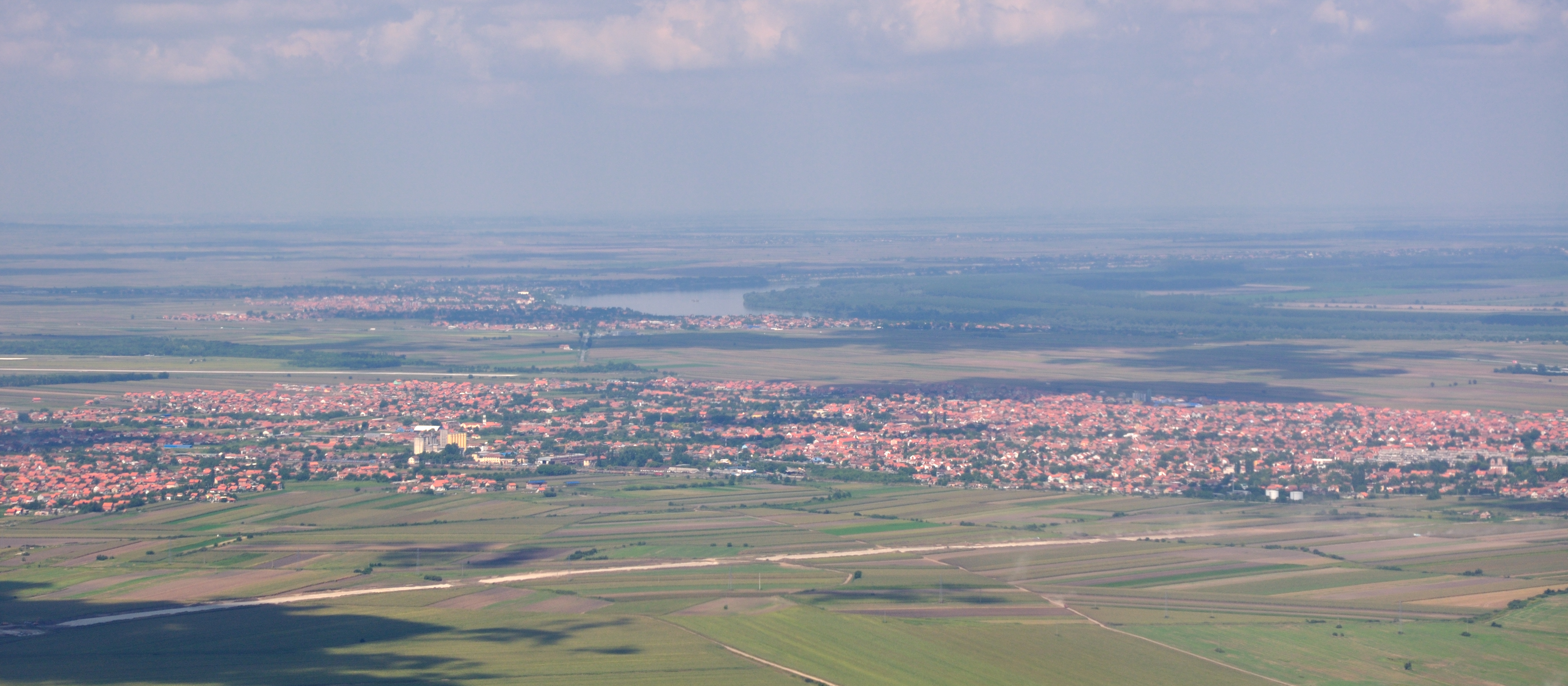
- Interactive map of Dobanovci
- Coordinates: 44°50′N 20°14′E
- Country: Serbia
- Municipality: Surčin

Area
  - Total: 55.68 km^{2} (21.50 sq mi)
- Elevation: 73 m (240 ft)

Population (2011)
  - Total: 8,503
  - Density: 152.7/km^{2} (395.5/sq mi)
- Time zone: UTC+1 (CET)
  - Summer (DST): UTC+2 (CEST)
- Postal code: 11272
- Area code: +381(0)11

Dobanovci (Serbian Cyrillic: Добановци) is a suburban neighborhood of Belgrade, Serbia. It is located in Belgrade's municipality of Surčin.

Dobanovci is located in the eastern Syrmia region, 25 km west of downtown Belgrade, between the Belgrade-Zagreb highway and the channeled stream of Galovica. It is the northernmost settlement in the municipality, 6 km northeast of the municipal seat of Surčin, close to the border of the Zemun municipality.

== History ==
Baden culture graves and ceramics (bowls, anthropomorphic urns) were found in the town.

First official mention of the town was in 1404 when its name appeared in the tax paying lists. Officially was proclaimed a settlement in the 18th century. Apparently the name comes from the title 'ban', just as the relatively close settlements of Novi Banovci (new ban's place) and Stari Banovci (old ban's place) both in the province of Vojvodina, in which case Dobanovci would mean '(the town) next to the ban's place'.

Until the early 1960s Dobanovci had its own municipality which was then annexed to the municipality of Surčin.

== Demographics ==
Despite its typical rural appearance, Dobanovci is officially classified as an urban settlement (town). It is the second largest settlement in the Surčin municipality, after the municipal seat and has a constant population growth. Dobanovci stretches southeast to Surčin and to the north in the direction of the settlements of Grmovac and Ugrinovci, forming one almost continuing ring-shaped built-up urban area in eastern Syrmia (Dobanovci-Surčin-Bežanija-Bežanijska Kosa-Plavi Horizonti-Altina-Zemun Polje-Busije-Ugrinovci-Grmovac). Population of Dobanovci according to the official censa:

- 1921 – 3,036
- 1931 – 3,298
- 1953 – 3,519
- 1971 – 6,741
- 1981 – 7,592
- 1991 – 7,691
- 2002 – 8,128

The only two significant ethnic groups (by census 2002) are Serbs (7,524 or 92,57%) and Slovaks (232 or 2,85%).

== Economy ==
As many formerly rural suburbs of Belgrade, Dobanovci has developed a typical suburban agriculture, mostly greenhouse cultivated vegetables. Several branches of industry developed in the past few decades, like footwear, food, brickworks and the repair facilities for tractors and agricultural machines.

Dobanovci is a major traffic junction. It is located on the Belgrade-Zagreb highway (E70), on the point where the future, still uncompleted Belgrade beltway separated from the highway. Also, Dobanovci has a train station the Belgrade's internal freight railway Batajnica–Surčin–Ostružnica–Železnik–Resnik which generally follows the route of the beltway. Several local roads also connects it to Surčin and Grmovac-Ugrinovci.

== Singidunum ==
In November 2019 it was announced that a completely new settlement will be built near Dobanovci Interchange on the beltway. The complex will cover 220 ha (540 acres). Named Singidunum, the settlement is planned as the typical satellite city which should include industrial park, residential zone, commercial-business center, medical center, green areas, etc. Economic facilities are planned for 9,700 workers. Residential area is projected to have apartments for 30% of the workers, which is 3,000 units, or 9,000 inhabitants, more than Dobanovci itself.

In August 2023, President of Serbia Aleksandar Vučić announced construction of the 18 km (11 mi) long railway from the Prokop station to the Belgrade Nikola Tesla Airport by 2026. The planned route will go via Zemun, Altina, Zemun Polje and newly planned Singidunum. After the 2027 and construction of the new national stadium, the railway will be extended to the stadium and then further to Jakovo, Surčin and Obrenovac.

== Sources ==
- Mala Prosvetina Enciklopedija, Third edition (1985); Prosveta; ISBN 86-07-00001-2
- Jovan Đ. Marković (1990): Enciklopedijski geografski leksikon Jugoslavije; Svjetlost-Sarajevo; ISBN 86-01-02651-6
