= Vukašin Radišić =

Serbian author, translator and writer (1810-1843)

- Born: 1810; Batajnica, Sanjak of Smederevo
- Died: 15 December 1843 (aged 32–33); Belgrade, Principality of Serbia
- Occupations: Poet, writer, translator, diplomat, professor

Vukašin Radišić (Serbian Вукашин Радишић; Batajnica, Serbia, 1810 – Belgrade, Principality of Serbia, 15 December 1843) was a Serbian poet, writer, translator, diplomat, and professor of the Greek language. Radišić was one of the first Serbian classical philologists known to have taught poetics.

== Academic career ==
After completing his studies in classical languages in Belgrade as well as abroad, Vukašin Radišić initially taught the Greek language. In 1836, Prince Miloš Obrenović appointed him a professor of Greek language and poetics in the Lyceum of the Principality of Serbia at Kragujevac, where he also led the choir (horovođa).

In 1837, he wrote the first Greek school textbook in Serbian, entitled Greek Reading Room for Learned Serbian Youth. In 1840, he published a Serbian translation of the dramatic parody Katomyomachia (Κατομυομαχία, Cat Mouse War) by the 12th-century scholar Theodoros Prodromos in the Belgrade journal Golubica. Radišić used the alternative title Galeomyomachia (Γαλεομυομαχία) for what was apparently the first modern translation of a secular Byzantine poetry text into Serbian. He also wrote several publications about the Greek scholar Adamantios Korais and other ancient and modern Greek philosophers of antiquity and recent times.

== Political career ==
Radišić was Secretary of the Legation of the Principality of Serbia at the Sublime Porte (kapaćehaja) in Istanbul, and a member of the Belgrade Foreign Ministry's secret service. In his Istanbul Letters, Radišić describes how he introduced Michał Czajkowski to Toma Vučić-Perišić and Avram Petronijević when the two Serbian Constitutionalists were in exile in Constantinople. The trio (Czajkowski, Petronijević, and Vučić) conspired to overthrow the Serbian government of the time, but the plan was not executed.

== Personal life ==
In March 1842, his daughter Jelena and wife Mara died within nine days of each other, presumably from the same illness (plague). Both were buried in the same grave, in the Church of St. Paraskeva, Istanbul. Following a dynastic coup d'état, as a supporter of the Obrenović dynasty, Radišić was dismissed immediately as secretary on 27 February 1843. Unwanted by the new authorities in Serbia, he remained in Constantinople for a period of time. During this period, he grew close to Adam Jerzy Czartoryski, leader of the Polish government-in-exile in Constantinople. He returned to Serbia in February 1843. His family tragedy and his constant hard work had damaged his health, and he died on 15 December 1843, a few months after returning to Belgrade. He was buried in the central Belgrade cemetery, next to St. Mark's Church (near today's Tašmajdan Park). He left 95 of his books at the Lyceum in Belgrade.

== Works ==
- Dva Socratova razgovora. Uranija, Beograd 1838.
- Adamant Koraj. Srbske novine, Beograd 1842, br. 6, dodatak.
- Adamanta Koraja reči Jelinima o nauci i prosveti, Golubica IV, 1842, 43–56.
- Adamanta Koraja novim Jelinima nauka o teatru, Golubica IV, 1842, 62–79.
- Beseda Adamanta Koraja k Jelinima, koji su vikali na filosofiju, Golubica V, 1843–1844, 60–79.
- Kritičnoe žitije basnotvorca Esopa i njegovi basnej, Glasnik Društva srpske slovesnosti IV, 1852, 32–74.
