= Mala Pruga =

Mala Pruga (Serbian Cyrillic: Мала Пруга) is an urban neighborhood of Belgrade, the capital of Serbia. It is located in Belgrade's municipality of Zemun.

Mala Pruga (or sometimes, after the street, in genitive case Male Pruge) is located in the northwestern periphery section of urban Zemun. The neighborhood is stretched along the street of the same name (Serbian for "little railway") and the new Belgrade-Novi Sad highway. It borders the neighborhoods of Galenika on the north, Altina on the south and in the northeast it extends in the direction of Zemun Polje. The neighborhood is a mixed residential-industrial, with small factories and many depots and warehouses.
