= Church of St. Nicholas, Dobanovci =

Church in Belgrade, Serbia

Church of St. Nicholas
- Crkva svetog Nikole; Црква светог Николе
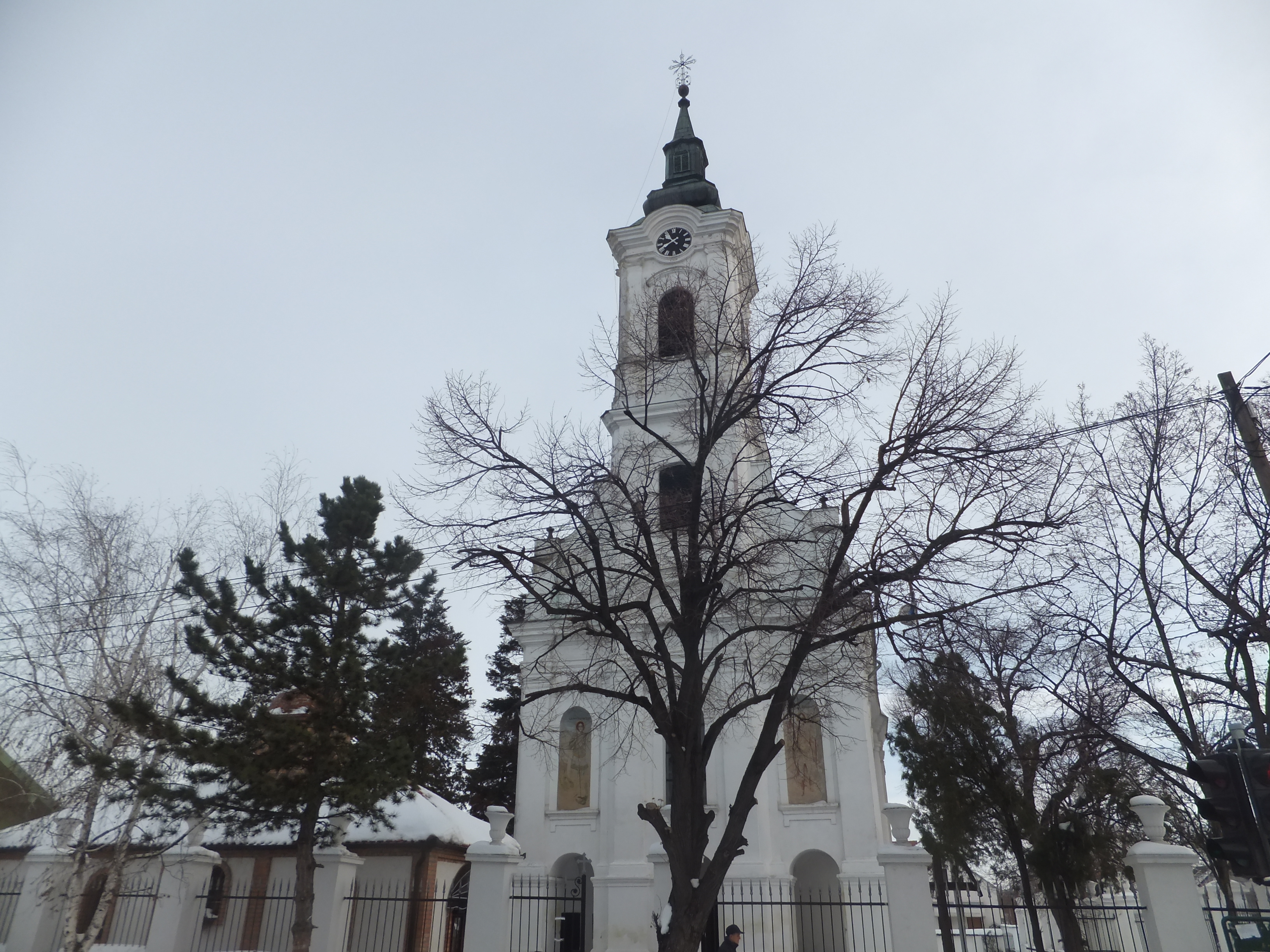
- Church of St Nicholas
- Church of St. Nicholas
- 44°49′41″N 20°13′23″E
- Location: Dobanovci, Belgrade

Cultural Heritage of Serbia
- Type: Cultural Monument of Great Importance
- Designated: 14 August 1981
- Reference no.: CK 102
- Country: Serbia
- Denomination: Serbian Orthodox

History
- Status: Church
- Dedication: St. Nicholas

Architecture
- Functional status: Active
- Style: Neo-classicism
- Years built: 1803

Administration
- Archdiocese: Eparchy of Srem

The Church of St. Nicholas (Serbian: Црква светог Николе) in Dobanovci is Serbian Orthodox church in Belgrade region, Serbia. The building was constructed on the site of earlier 18th-century church. It features a classical architectural style with elements of Baroque, characterized by a rectangular single-nave structure with a semi-circular apse and a two-story, Baroque-styled bell tower. The iconostasis and high-quality decorative woodwork were crafted in 1836 by the renowned Vojvodina woodcarver Georgije Dević. The icons on the iconostasis were painted between 1841 and 1842 by the famous 19th-century Serbian painter Petar Čortanović. The church also houses a rich collection of rare icons, church furniture, old printed books from the 18th century, and registers of births, marriages, and deaths from the 18th to the 20th century.

== See also ==
- Eparchy of Srem
