= Altina, Belgrade =

Altina Алтина
- Urban neighbourhood
- Location within Belgrade
- Coordinates: 44°51′06″N 20°21′03″E
- Country: Serbia
- Region: Belgrade
- Municipality: Zemun
- Time zone: UTC+1 (CET)
  - Summer (DST): UTC+2 (CEST)
- Area code: +381(0)11
- Car plates: BG

Altina (Serbian Cyrillic: Алтина) is an urban neighborhood of Belgrade, Serbia. Located in Belgrade's municipality of Zemun, it is one of the newest and fastest growing parts of the city.

== Location ==
Altina is located just out of the north-western section of the Belgrade City urban proper (uža teritorija grada), 11 kilometers west of downtown Belgrade. It borders the neighborhoods of Galenika in the north, Zemun Bačka in the east, Vojni Put I and Plavi Horizonti in the south while to the west the neighborhood extends in the direction of Zemun Polje. The northern and eastern borders of Altina are marked by the sharp elbow turn of the road of Novosadski put, Dobanovački put marks the southern one, with Pazovački put and Ugrinovački put running through the middle of the neighborhood.

== History ==
Until the middle 1990s the area was virtually uninhabited with only a few storehouse facilities. With the outbreak of the Yugoslav Wars in 1991, and especially after the 1995 Oluja operation, many refugees settled in this area, which resulted in the creation of several new settlements (Altina, Plavi Horizonti, Grmovac, Busije). Altina grew into a small town, with over 50 streets, adjoining Zemun's western urban area. The local community of Nova Galenika, which covers the neighborhoods of Galenika, Nova Galenika and Altina had a population of 12,533 in 2002, but as over 100,000 refugees gained Serbian citizenship after the 2002 census, newspapers and the municipality of Zemun gives an estimate of 18,000 to 20,000 inhabitants for the combined population of Altina and Plavi Horizonti (without Galenika).

== Characteristics ==
As a result of non-planned, accelerated growth Altina grew almost into a slum. After 2000, the urbanistic arrangement of the settlement began: the roads were paved, streets, which were enumerated (Altina 1, 2, 3, etc.), received names and the public transportation was extended to Altina (bus lines number 81 and 81L). However, many problems concerning basic communal infrastructure remain. Despite that, over 1,000 small family companies and shops operate in Altina. Also, the terrain is rich in underground waters, which flooded the settlement in 2005 and 2006.

The elementary school "Sava Šumanović" was opened in 2009. One of the largest in Belgrade, as of 2023 it had some 900 pupils.

Construction of the first park in the neighborhood was announced in May 2020. The 7,000 m^{2} (75,000 sq ft) large park will be located in the northern part of Altina. Construction began in January 2021. It will include decorative and drinking fountains, a children's playground, sculptures and outdoor gym. It will be one of the largest parks in the city's outer neighborhoods.
