= Plavi Horizonti =

Plavi Horizonti Плави Хоризонти
- Urban neighbourhood
- Location within Belgrade
- Coordinates: 44°50′56″N 20°20′27″E
- Country: Serbia
- Region: Belgrade
- Municipality: Zemun

Population
  - Total: 2,100
- Time zone: UTC+1 (CET)
  - Summer (DST): UTC+2 (CEST)
- Area code: +381(0)11
- Car plates: BG

Plavi Horizonti (Serbian Cyrillic: Плави Хоризонти) is an urban neighborhood of Belgrade, the capital of Serbia. It is located in Belgrade's municipality of Zemun. With Altina, one of the newest and fastest developing neighborhoods.

== Location ==
Plavi Horizont is located in the western section of Zemun, stretching along the Belgrade-Novi Sad railway. It borders the neighborhoods of Altina in the north and stretches into the direction of Vojni Put II and Kolonija Zmaj on the southeast and Zemun Polje on the northwest.

== History ==
Until the late 1990s the area was an uninhabited barren meadow. With the outbreak of the Yugoslav Wars in 1991, and especially after the 1995 Oluja offensive of the Croatian Army, many refugees settled in this area, which resulted in creation of several new settlements (Altina, Plavi Horizonti, Grmovac, Busije). The settlement began to grow in the early 2000s and consists solely from the individual residential houses with yards.

== Characteristics ==
Plavi Horizonti and Altina grew into the small town, adjoining the Zemun's western urban area and making an urban connection to the neighborhoods of Školsko Dobro and Zemun Polje.

After 2000, certain urbanistic arrangement of the settlement began: the roads and streets were paved, etc. but many problems concerning the communal infrastructure remain.

The name of the settlement is descriptive, meaning “blue horizons” in Serbian. When the Sun would rise or set, the vast meadows which preceded the settlement would appear bluish.

There is a church dedicated to Saint Athanasius the Great in Plavi Horizonti. On 9 October 2023, a memorial was dedicated in the churchyard, commemorating citizens of Peć killed during the Kosovo war. The memorial was designed by the architect Gorica Bojović Ljubenov, and contains 167 names of people killed in 1998 and 1999, and names of the children killed in the 2003 Goraždevac murders. The memorial was funded by donations from exiled residents of Peć.

== Population ==
Estimated population in 2013 was 2,000 inhabitants in 700 houses.
