= Ugrinovci, Belgrade =

Ugrinovci
- Suburban settlement
- Interactive map of Ugrinovci
- Location within Serbia
- Coordinates: 44°52′42″N 20°11′13″E
- Country: Serbia

Area
  - Total: 50.33 km^{2} (19.43 sq mi)
- Elevation: 66 m (217 ft)

Population (2011)
  - Total: 10,807
  - Density: 214.7/km^{2} (556.1/sq mi)
- Time zone: UTC+1 (CET)
  - Summer (DST): UTC+2 (CEST)

Ugrinovci (Serbian Cyrillic: Угриновци) is a suburban settlement of Belgrade, Serbia. It is located in Belgrade's municipality of Zemun.

== Location ==
Ugrinovci is located in the eastern section of the Syrmia region, in the western part of the municipality of Zemun, near the administrative border of the municipality of Vojvodina. It is located on the Batajnica-Dobanovci road. In the northern direction to Batajnica, which is 8 kilometres (5 miles) away, is the new sub-neighborhood of Busije, while in the northern direction to Dobanovci (4 kilometres (2 miles), over the Belgrade-Zagreb highway) is the also new sub-neighbourhood of Grmovac, both being populated since the mid-1990s with refugees from Croatia and Bosnia and Herzegovina, which almost doubled the population of Ugrinovci.

== Demographics ==
The population of Ugrinovci has been steadily growing for the last four decades. The population according to the official censuses:

- 1948 - 1,769
- 1953 - 1,728
- 1961 - 1,895
- 1971 - 2,258
- 1981 - 3,278
- 1991 - 4,007
- 2002 - 7,199
- 2012 - 10,807

Ethnic structure

In 2002, 97.33% of residents were Serbs and 0.55% were Romani.

== Characteristics ==
Ugrinovci is a village with the majority of its population employed in agriculture. Since the detachment of the municipality of Surčin from Zemun in 2003, Ugrinovci has remained the only separate settlement in the municipality of Zemun, as all the other settlements (Batajnica, Zemun Polje, former city of Zemun, etc.) are part of the Belgrade city proper (uža teritorija grada).

The name of the village comes from the medieval name for Hungarians (Ugri).

== See also ==
- Busije
- Grmovac
