= Goveđi Brod =

Goveđi Brod (Serbian Cyrillic: Говеђи брод) is an urban neighborhood of Belgrade, the capital of Serbia. It is located in Belgrade's municipality of Zemun.

== Location ==
Goveđi Brod is the northwestern extension of urban Zemun proper, located on the right bank of the Danube. It occupies roughly the area between the Danube and the road which connects Zemun and the outer suburb of Batajnica (Batajnički drum). The only other urban neighborhood that it borders is Galenika, but it extends in the direction of Zemun Polje (northwest) and Gornji Grad (south, through Galenika).

== Characteristics ==
Goveđi Brod is almost entirely a non-residential area. Some major facilities in the neighborhood are the Mining Institute and the Veterinarian Institute. The neighborhood also includes a large area of storehouses, and two gravel and concrete processing plants, "DIA" and "Anicom", both on the Danube's bank.

=== Romani population ===
Goveđi Brod is known for being a former informal settlement of the Romani people. Known for having some of the worst living conditions in Belgrade area (total lack of running water, electricity, sewage, etc.), the settlement inhabited mostly by the Roma refugees from Kosovo and Metohija was set right in the Danube's river bed and was regularly flooded every spring with the rise of the water level of the river.

Goveđi Brod was wiped out during the major 2006 European floods. In February 2007 Roma families moved into the new houses built in the new neighborhood of Plavi Horizonti in Zemun.
