= Batajnica =

Batajnica Батајница
- Urban neighbourhood
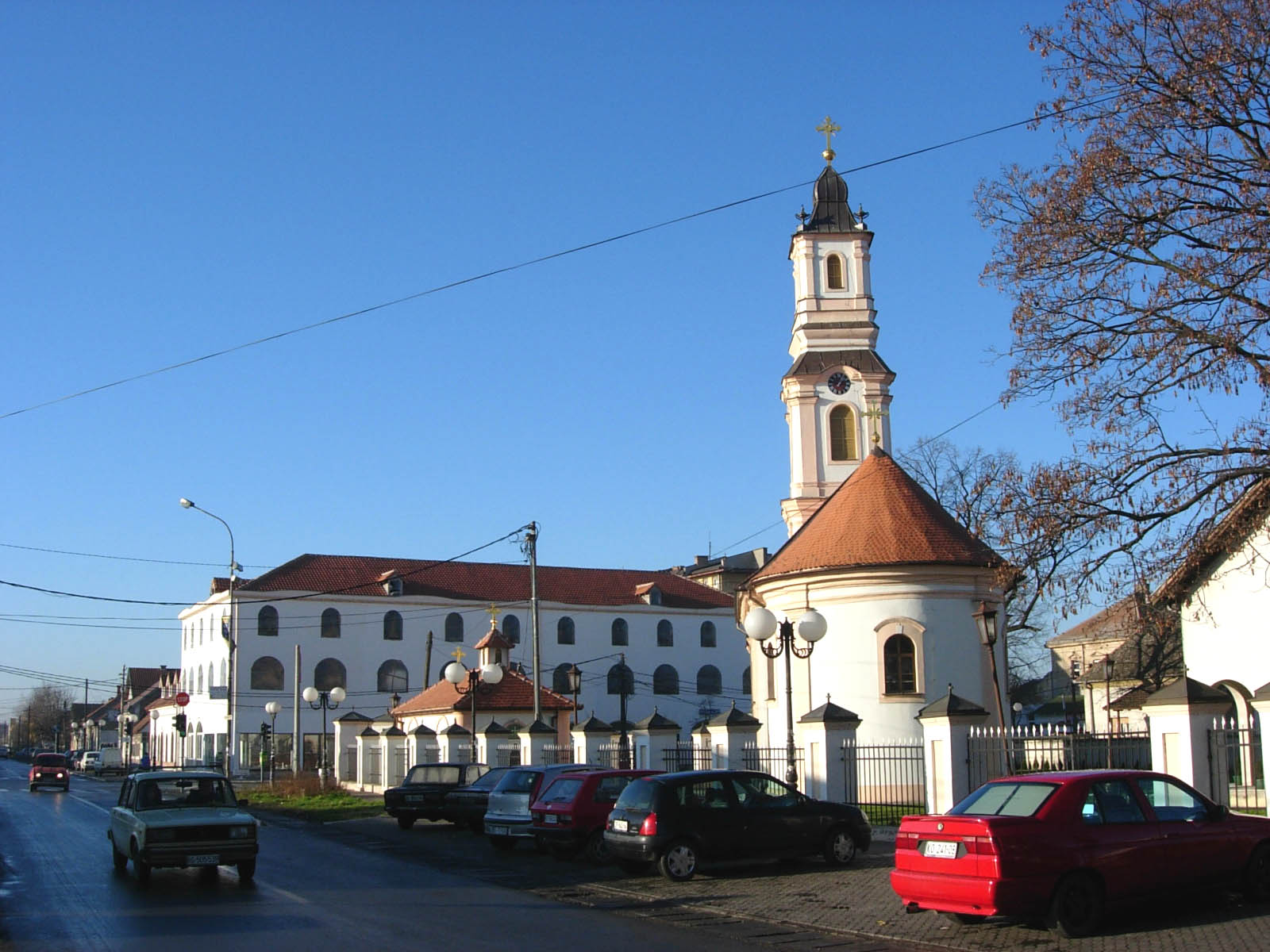
- The Orthodox church of Saint Archangel Gabriel in Batajnica

- Location within Belgrade
- Coordinates: 44°54.4′N 20°16.6′E
- Country: Serbia
- Region: Belgrade
- Municipality: Zemun

Area
  - Total: 44.27 km^{2} (17.09 sq mi)

Population (2022)
  - Total: 34,169
  - Density: 771.8/km^{2} (1,999/sq mi)
- Time zone: UTC+1 (CET)
  - Summer (DST): UTC+2 (CEST)
- Area code: +381(0)11
- Car plates: BG

Batajnica (Serbian Cyrillic: Батајница, pronounced [bǎtaːjnitsa]) is an urban neighborhood of Belgrade, the capital city of Serbia. It is located in the Belgrade municipality of Zemun.

== Location and geography ==
Batajnica is located in the Syrmia region, in the northern part of the municipality, close to the administrative border of the province of Vojvodina and it is both the northernmost and the westernmost part of the Belgrade's urban area. It is close to the Danube's right bank, but not on the river itself, due to the floodings. A small, 114 metre-high hillock separates the settlement from the river.

It is some 15 kilometres away from downtown Belgrade, but only 6 kilometres away from Nova Pazova and Novi Banovci, fast growing settlements in the Vojvodina's municipality of Stara Pazova, to which it almost makes a continuous built-up area. : it extends to the southwest in the direction of Ugrinovci's neighborhood of Busije and southeast in the direction of other Zemun's neighborhoods: Zemun Polje, Galenika and Goveđi Brod.

Loess cliff "Kapela", located in Batajnica, was protected by the city on 28 May 2014. The cliff is located on the very steep right bank of the Danube. The layers were formed in the past five glacial-interglacial cycles. "Kapela" is one of the most complete paleoclimatic archives in Europe for the past 620.000 years. Further survey showed that the oldest layers in Kapela are some 800,000 years old. It is part of the same loess ridge as another natural monument, Zemun Loess Profile, though this section is younger, originating from 500,000 years ago. The vertical cliff above the Danube is 30 to 40 m (98 to 131 ft) high. The entire plateau was formed when during the colder, Ice Age periods, strong winds from the Alps and the Carpathians would bring and deposit yellowish loess. During the warmer, interglacial phases, the lush vegetation would develop on loess, forming different fossilized soils, like red and brown earth.

== History ==
Vučedol culture-graves from the Bronze Age were found in the fields of Batajnica.

In May 2020, during the construction of the Batajnica interchange on the Belgrade bypass, remains from the 1st century BC (Later Iron Age) were discovered. The archaeological locality was previously unknown. Discovered pottery artifacts were large, nicely preserved and made using potter's wheel, a technology brought by the Celts in these areas, so it is believed that the find was Celtic settlement or place of worship, built before the Roman conquest of the region. The locality was surveyed in July 2020, with additional pottery, bronze fibulas and residuals of bonfires being discovered. The locality is situated in the territory surrounded by the discoveries of Celtic settlements from that period, in both downtown and wider Belgrade area (Singidunum, Rospi Ćuprija, Karaburma, Jakovo, Stari Slankamen).

The modern settlement is first registered in 1708, of a school in the village and mentioning of the settlement in 1725 and 1753, when it was described as a small village with 90 wealthy households. The settlement in its modern shape originates from the period of the abolition of the Military Frontier in 1873 and the settlements of the former soldiers and their families in the village. This practice was continued further, so after World War I, war veterans were also settled in Batajnica.

Batajnica was a district (srez) seat between two World Wars. After the war it became part of the Zemun district, but still as a separate municipality, and together with it part of Belgrade district in 1955, when the municipality was abolished. A movement for re-creating the old Batajnica municipality was very active in 2002, when Surčin also (and successfully) campaigned, but was not much in the public media. Proposed municipality of Batajnica would split from the municipality of Zemun and comprise Batajnica and Ugrinovci (with Busije and Grmovac), with a population of 37,371 in 2002.

The movement for splitting from Zemun was revived in the 2010s by the citizens' groups, but also by some politicians, though no official steps were taken. In 2020, some city officials stated unofficially that Batajnica is the most probable candidate for the new, 18th municipality of Belgrade. Grassroots movement for separate municipality was founded in June 2021 ("Option for our municipality Batajnica"). Coalition Moramo, during the campaign for the April 2022 local elections in Belgrade, opted for creating a new Batajnica municipality.

In the past Batajnica almost had no urban connection to the rest of the city, but now situation is changed. Batajnica was declared a part of the Belgrade City proper (uža teritorija grada) in the early 1970s, losing the status of the separate settlement.

Batajnica was a target of NATO airstrikes during its bombing of Yugoslavia, conducted in the form of Operation Allied Force, lasting from March 24, 1999, until June 10, 1999. Milica Rakić, a three-year-old, was killed from a NATO shrapnel on April 25, 1999.

Batajnica is the site of the Batajnica mass graves, where the bodies of 744 Kosovo Albanians civilians were founded.

== Demographics ==
Historical population
Year	Pop.	±% p.a.
1921	2,486	—
1931	3,212	+2.60%
1948	3,674	+0.79%
1953	5,291	+7.57%
1961	8,394	+5.94%
1971	14,567	+5.67%
1981	18,599	+2.47%
1991	24,374	+2.74%
2002	30,172	+1.96%
2011	32,853	+0.95%
2022	34,169	+0.36%

Batajnica experienced a constant population growth in the 20th century. A special bust to the neighborhood's population was given in the mid-1990s with a large influx of refugees from the Yugoslav Wars, especially the Oluja military action which forced almost 250,000 Serbs from Croatia into Serbia, and many of them settled at the outskirts of Belgrade.

== Traffic ==
Batajnica is a major traffic crossroad. Construction of the Batajnica Intermodal Transit Centre, the first freight intermodal terminal complex in Serbia, was planned in 2013. The money from the EU IPA funds was secured, but the pending adoption of the new city general urban plan, which was to determine the details of the project, and the political dispute between the construction minister Velimir Ilić and Belgrade mayor Dragan Đilas, halted the project. In December 2018, transportation minister Zorana Mihajlović said she was "hopeful" that the construction will start in 2019. By January 2019 city purchased the privately owned parcels and it was announced that the project was green-lighted, including the FIDIC-ruled bidding for the contractor. The complex will cover 10 ha (25 acres), including 2 ha (4.9 acres) of the central container-storing plateau, 5 ha (12 acres) of the green areas, 70 parking lots and 3 km (1.9 mi) of additional rail and road infrastructure.

=== Railway ===
Batajnica is located on the Belgrade-Novi Sad railway and a place where one line of the railway separates and through the Belgrade's part of the Syrmia crosses the Sava river at Ostružnica and continues through the southern outskirts of the Belgrade, forming an internal city's freight rail beltway.

=== Road ===
Batajnica is located on both Belgrade-Novi Sad roads: the old one (Stari Novosadski put) and the new one (Belgrade-Novi Sad highway). Two roads go parallel from Zemun (old one officially named Batajnica road or Batajnički drum) and at the very entrance into Batajnica they cross each other via an interchange. The Old Novi Sad road continues through the middle of the settlement (as the central street) and further into the Vojvodina, to Nova Pazova and Novi Sad. Two other important regional roads split from Batajnica: one to the south-west, to Ugrinovci and the other one to the north, to Novi Banovci. Batajnica is also the projected starting point of the future Belgrade beltway. Batajnica is connected to Belgrade by several bus lines of the city's public transportation: 73 (from Batajnica railway station to Block 45), 706(from end Batajanica to Zeleni Venac), 703 (from Ugrinovci to Zemunski Kej) and 706E (from Batajnica airport to Zemunski Kej). Batajnica also have two bus lines of the city's public transportation which do not leave Batajnica: 700 (end and start from Batajnica railway station) and 702 (from Busije to Batajnica railway station)

=== Air transportation ===
A military airbase is located nearby. Batajnica Airbase, with a limited civil traffic, was heavily bombarded on a daily basis in 1999 during the NATO bombing of Serbia.

== Economy and sport ==
Before accelerated urbanization in the second half of the 20th century, Batajnica was an agricultural village. As a result of this, the first industry was connected to this: food industry, mills, brickworks, roof tiles production, etc. Later, some heavy industry began to develop (bridge construction facilities) and today almost 400 privately owned small companies, repair shops, stores, etc. exist in the neighborhood.

Along the Batajnica Road, one of the oldest campgrounds in Serbia is located. One of only three officially designated camping sites in Belgrade, it is named "Dunav" (Danube) and is one of the most visited in the country. As of 2018, it ended up being surrounded by the new developing industrial zone and has no access to the river anymore.

BSK Batajnica is the town's local football club, who play in the fifth highest football league in Serbia (Prva Beogradska Liga).

== Neighborhoods ==
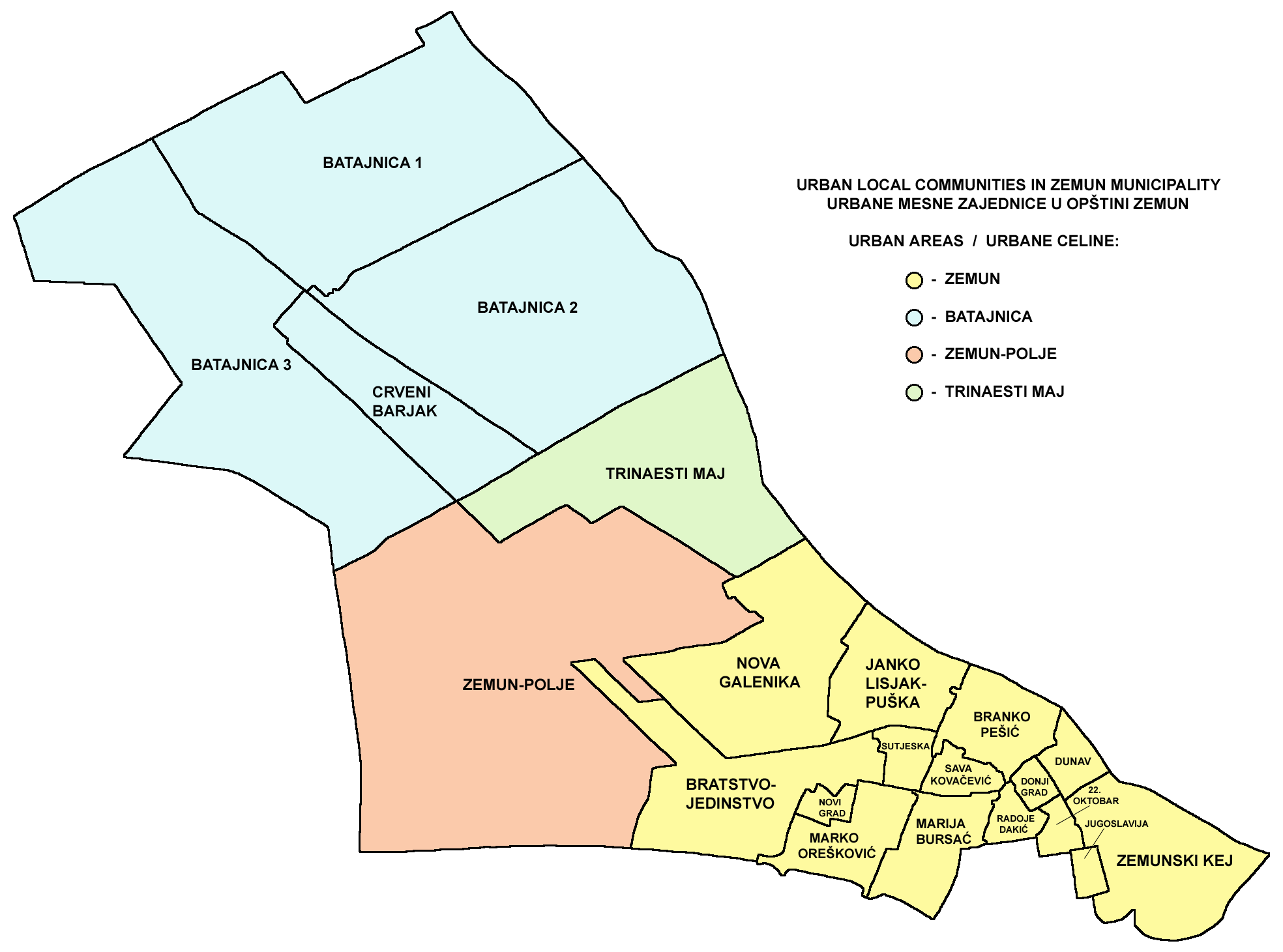
Map of Urban local communities in Zemun municipality

As a relatively large settlement, Batajnica developed several sub-neighborhoods of its own.

=== 13. Maj ===
Former local community next to Batajnica, with a population of 956 in 2010. The original settlement was built by the Ministry of the interior from 1946 to 1948. It is surrounded by farms and located near the Danube. There is one soccer club with a regular sized field and a training ground where "FK 13. Maj" plays.

In the extreme western side of the local community, close to Zemun Polje, an airstrip became operational in 2001. There is also a pilots training school for the ultra-light aircraft. The airstrip is designated for the recreational and private flights.

After the 2002 census, local communities of the old city core of Zemun were abolished, while those on periphery were merged. In that process, the local community 13. Maj, instead being merged in Batajnica, was merged with Zemun Polje. As a result, the neighborhood and the airstrip are variously named as part of Batajnica or Zemun Polje in the news reports, even in the same ones, and the section of the Danube's bank at the settlement became the bank of Zemun Polje. In August 2023, Pošta Srbije, Serbian national postal office service, announced construction of a massive logistics center on this bank. It will include large storage spaces, cold storages, and duty-free zone on the 23 ha (57 acres) large parcel. The complex should be finished by 2033.

While it was a separate one, the local community 13. Maj had a population of 1.304 in 1981, 743 in 1991, and 664 in 2002.

=== Crveni Barjak ===
The largest single local community within Batajnica (population of 11,129 in 2002), Crveni Barjak begins near the entrance into Batajnica, where the large interchange is located. It extends to the south, forming the future urban connection between Batajnica and Zemun Polje. Heating plant is also located in the neighborhood. Its name, crveni barjak, is Serbian for the "red banner".

=== Naselje Ekonomija ===
The oldest urban settlement in Batajnica, built by the Army FNRY in 1948. year. It is situated at the entrance to Batajnica from the direction of Zemun.

=== Oficirska Kolonija ===
The neighborhood at the exit from Batajnica in direction of the airport is called Oficirska Kolonija ("officers colony"). The neighborhood was named that way as it was originally settled by the families of the military officers who worked at the airport.

=== Šangaj ===
One of the fastest expanding parts of Batajnica, across the railway, concentrated along the Šangajska street (after the city of Shanghai in China) and some other adjoining streets. It extends to the north east, toward the Busije and Ugrinovci (Šangajska itself extends into the road to Ugrinovci). Area, which previously consisted of corn fields, was slowly urbanised from the 1960s and 1970s and especially growing in the 1990s with the influx of the refugees from Croatia. Dozen of still nameless streets in the neighborhood were paved in 2006. It is a purely residential area, notorious for its bad communal infrastructure. The waterworks reached parts of the neighborhood only in 2018.

== Characteristics ==
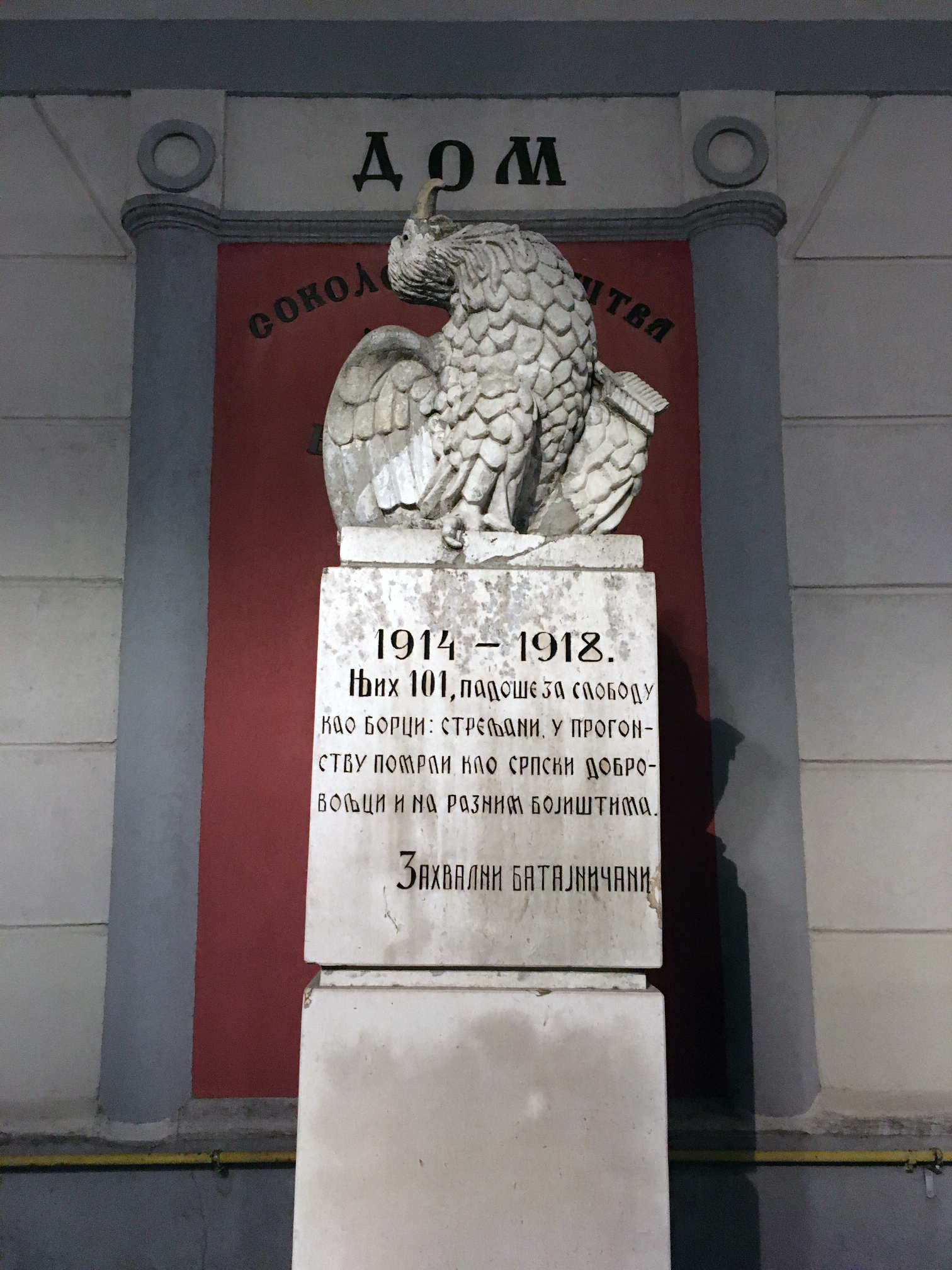
Monument dedicated to WW1 volunteers from Batajnica

=== Schools ===
The elementary school "Boško Palkovljević Pinki" is located at 5 Pukovnika Milenka Pavlovića Street. It was built by knez Nikola Vulko from 1875 to 1880. The building distinguishes itself from the surrounding residential village houses and is a rarity, as the preserved, typical, purposely built building from the second half of the 19th century. With additional role in the continued development of education in the southeast part of Syrmia, it has been declared a cultural monument in January 2019.

The elementary school "Svetislav Golubović Mitraljeta" was founded on 20 June 1969. The pupils moved into the new, present building at 94 Dalmatinske Zagore Street on 6 December 1969. It was fully reconstructed in 2023.

=== Cemetery ===
Batajnica cemetery, just east of downtown and next to the farmers market, was completely surrounded by the urban tissue by the 2020s. In March 2023 construction of the New Batajnica Cemetery was announced for the late 2023 or early 2024. It will be located outside of the urban section, further to the east, in the direction of the motorway. It will cover 11.26 ha (27.8 acres) and will be situated at an extension of the Braće Smiljanića Street.

Milica Rakić, a three-year-old girl who was tragically killed during the NATO bombing of Yugoslavia, is buried here.

=== Park Little Milica Rakić ===
In 2005 Serbian Ministry of Defence arranged a previously unattended green area across the new Church of the Nativity of the Blessed Virgin Mary into the memorial-park "Little Milica Rakić". It was dedicated to the three-years old girl Milica Rakić (b. 9 January 1996, Belgrade - d. 17 April 1999, Batajnica), killed during the NATO bombing of Serbia. As the park was not declared a city park, it was not maintained properly so by 2017 in ended being in the very bad shape. In July 2017 it was fully renovated. For the most part, park was constructed as the children playground. There is also a memorial drinking fountain, dedicated to Milica, in the park.

== Sources ==
- Mala Enciklopedija Prosveta, Third edition (1985); Prosveta; ISBN 86-07-00001-2
- Jovan Đ. Marković (1990): Enciklopedijski geografski leksikon Jugoslavije; Svjetlost-Sarajevo; ISBN 86-01-02651-6
