= Busije =

Busije Бусије
- suburban settlement
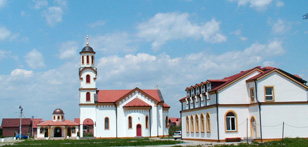
- The Orthodox church Saints Cyril and Methodius

- Location within Serbia
- Country: Serbia
- District: Belgrade
- Municipality: Zemun

Population (2016)
  - Total: about 5,000
- Time zone: UTC+1 (CET)
  - Summer (DST): UTC+2 (CEST)

Busije (Serbian Cyrillic: Бусије) is a suburban neighborhood of Belgrade, the capital of Serbia. It is located in Belgrade's municipality of Zemun.

== Location ==
Busije is a sub-neighborhood of Ugrinovci, the only separate settlement in the municipality (urban section of Zemun is administratively part of the Belgrade proper). It is located halfway between Ugrinovci and Batajnica, westernmost section of the Belgrade proper.

== History ==
Just like the other similar settlement, Grmovac, origins of Busije (Serbian for 'ambush') date from 1997 when the Zemun's municipal leadership decided to sell empty lots to the refugees from Croatia who were forced out after the Operation Storm in 1995. Prices were relatively low and many people bought the land, regardless of the fact that area has not been designated for urban development and the lack of any infrastructure.

== Area and population ==
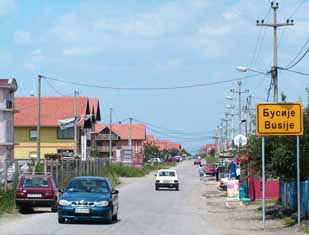
Central street in Busije

Originally. Busije covered an area of 42 hectares, divided into 1.300 lots for individual houses. By 2017 number of houses reached 2,000 and population has been estimated between 5,000 and 7,000, out of which 80-90 % make refugees from Croatia and Bosnia and Herzegovina.

== Development ==
Settlement remained cut off from the rest of the city for the first ten years as the City of Belgrade drafted its first urban development plan for Busije in 2007. Proper road were built in 2006, followed soon by the ambulance, Serbian Orthodox Church of Saints Cyril and Methodius and urban transportation line 702. Water, electricity and street lights were also introduced but Busije still has no school or kindergarten. Not having many other economic options, small craft shops developed: bakeries, grocery stores, car repair shops, locksmith and carpenter shops, etc.

First elementary school, a dependency of the "Branko Radičević" elementary school from Batajnica, was opened in 2020.

== See also ==
- Grmovac
- Ugrinovci
