= Grmovac =

- suburban settlement
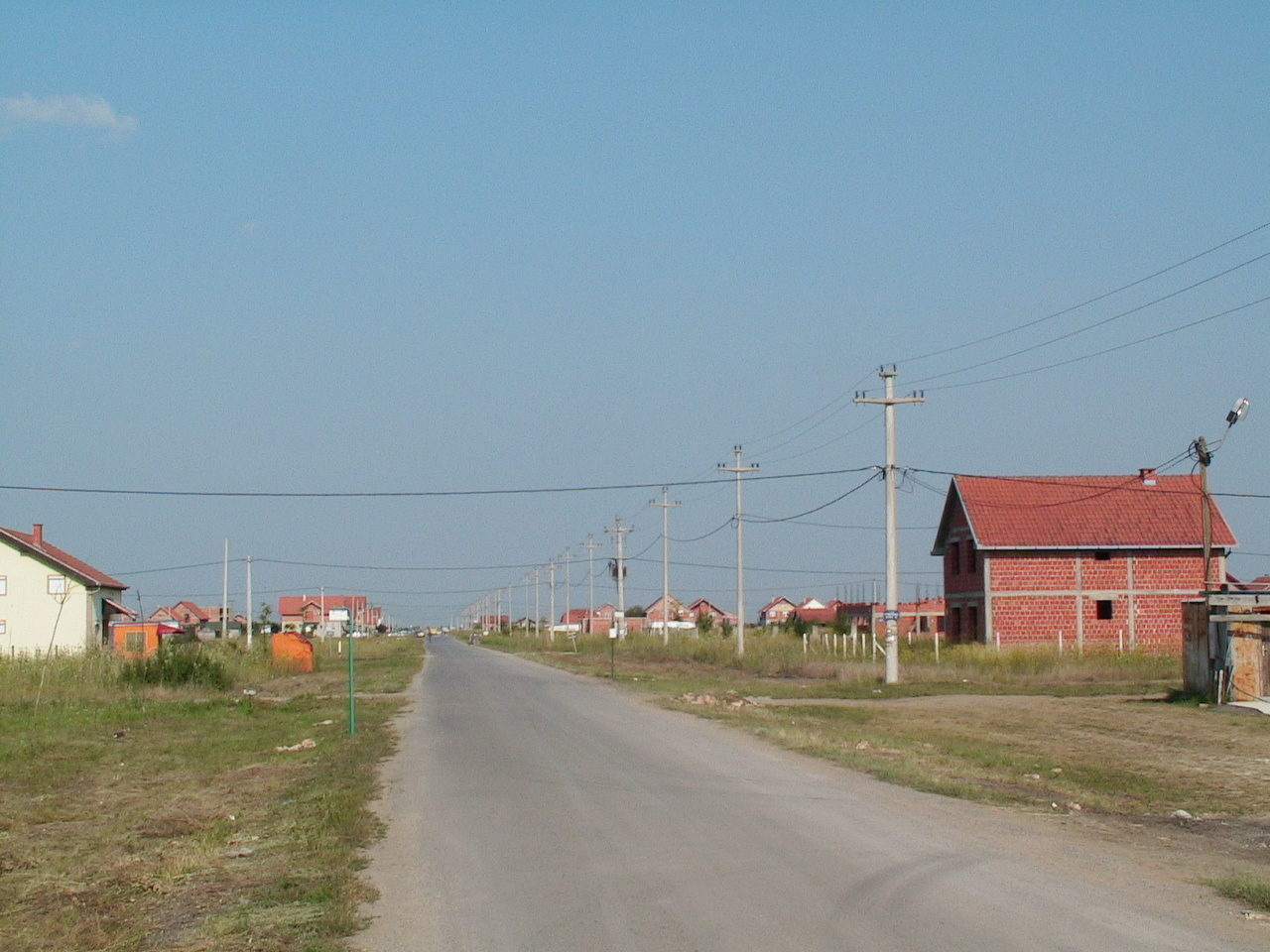
- Interactive map of Grmovac
- Country: Serbia
- Established: 1996

Population
  - Total: 700−1,500
- Time zone: UTC+1 (CET)
  - Summer (DST): UTC+2 (CEST)

Grmovac (Serbian Cyrillic: Грмовац) is a suburban settlement of Belgrade, the capital of Serbia. It is located in Belgrade's municipality of Zemun.

== Location ==
Grmovac is a sub-neighborhood of Ugrinovci, which is 3 km away and to which it makes no urban connection, near the Belgrade-Zagreb highway and the village of Dobanovci in the neighboring municipality of Surčin.

== History ==
Origins of Grmovac (Serbian for 'bushy place') date from 1996/7 when the Zemun's municipal leadership (ruled by the Serbian Radical Party and headed by Vojislav Šešelj) decided to sell empty lots on a barren meadow to the refugees from Croatia which were forced out after the Operation Storm in 1995. Prices were low and many people bought the land (some 3,000 lots which still brought significant income to the municipality) not paying attention that the area was not designated for urban development and the lack of any infrastructure.

== Characteristics ==
The city government considers the settlement a 'wild' one as it was built without any permits or plans. The total lack of infrastructure (including not just schools, ambulances or kindergartens, but such basic things like running water, grocery stores, pavement or electricity) prevented the settlement from any major growth. Out of 3,000 lots, only on 600 there are houses (out of which almost half is not finished). Population varies from 1,500 during summer to 700 during winter when conditions get even harsher.

Year 2006 brought some changes. Accessible road to the settlement has been paved with asphalt, a bus line (No. 606) to connect Grmovac to Dobanovci and electricity were introduced and the construction of a church began. Electricity was supposed to be introduced in December 2006 on a temporary basis for 6 months from 'humanitarian reasons' as the entire settlement is classified as an illegal one, but was postponed until February 2007. However, city government accepted to make a regulatory plan for Grmovac until December 2007 so that settlement could develop further. The plan proposes complete urban and communal infrastructure to be finished in 3 years. Urban shaping continued with the construction of a new church, dedicated to the prophet Elijah, began in summer 2007. Introduction of the proper electrical grid in the settlement began in 2010.

The settlement remains the subject of a dispute between the Radical's municipal government (claiming that city government is not doing anything to make life easier for the Grmovac population) and Belgrade city government which claims that municipal government had no rights to sell those lots but they did it to take money from the people and thus created a problem.

As of August 2017, the settlement still has no school, post office or a local clinic and has only one grocery shop.
