= List of buildings in Belgrade =

This is a list of notable buildings in Belgrade, Serbia.

== Academic buildings ==
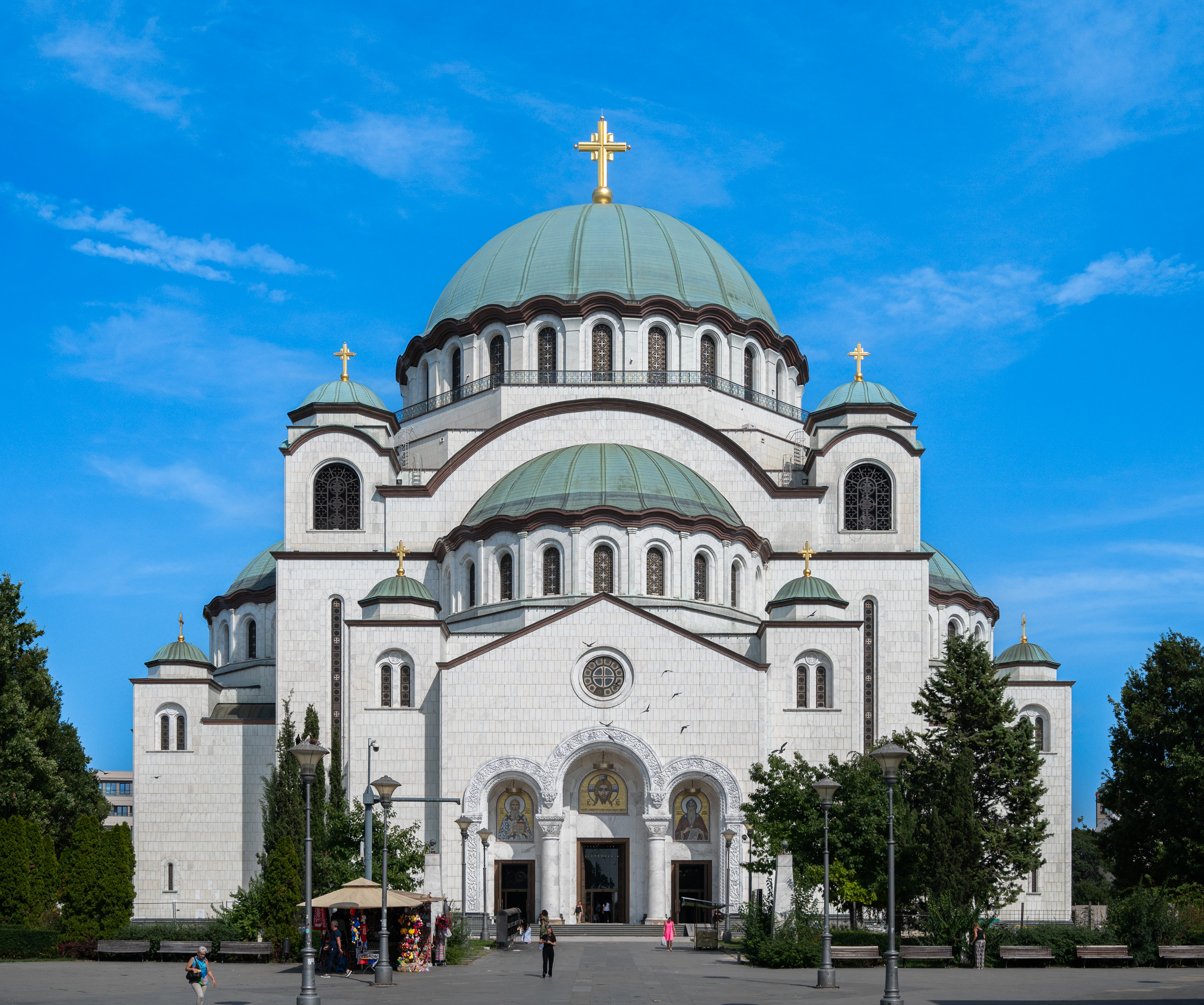
Church of Saint Sava

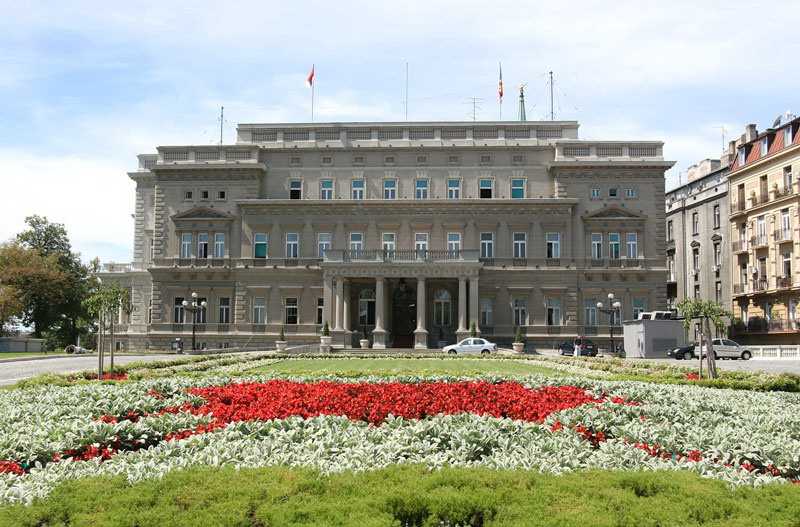
Stari Dvor

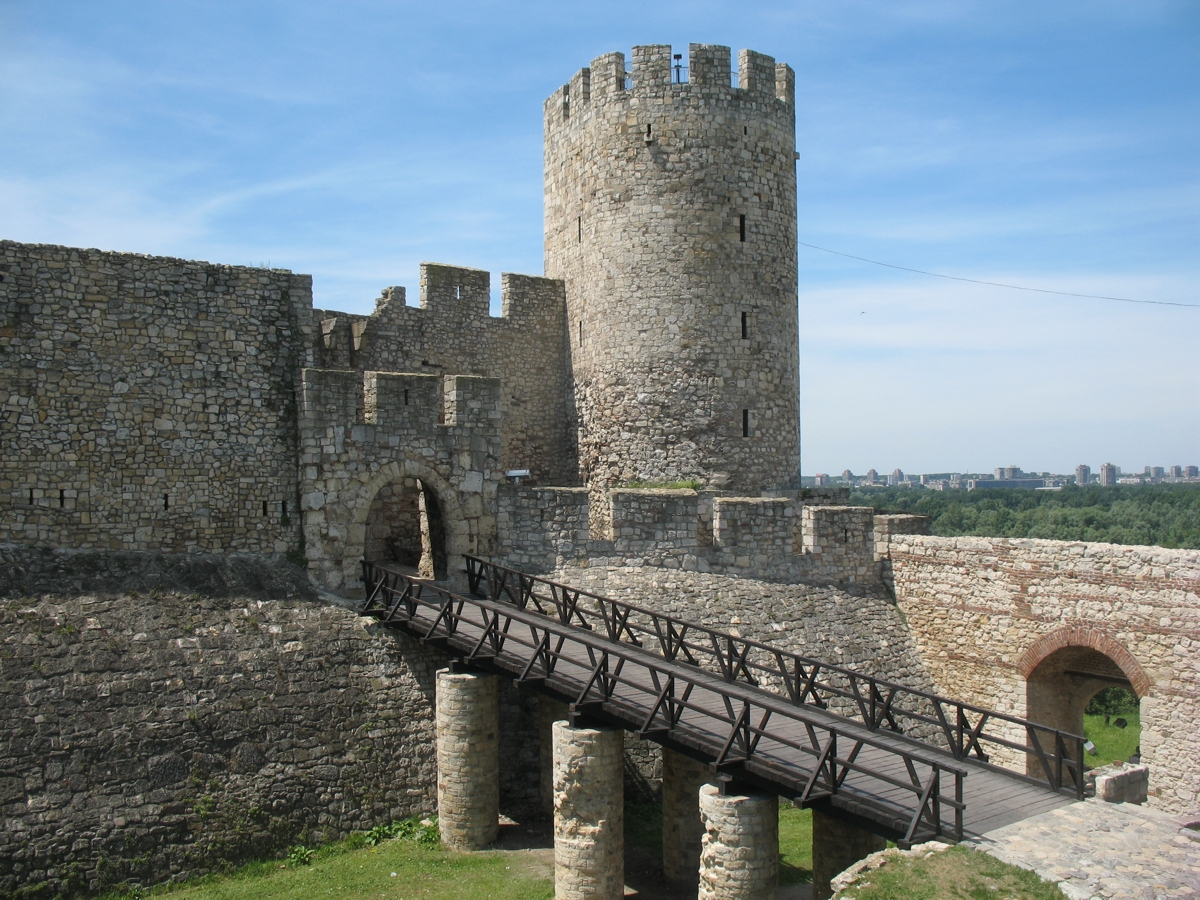
Despot Stefan Tower

- Belgrade Faculty of Architecture
- Belgrade Faculty of Law
- Belgrade Faculty of Medicine
- Belgrade Faculty of Organizational Sciences
- Belgrade Faculty of Philology
- Belgrade Faculty of Philosophy
- Belgrade Faculty of Political Sciences
- Belgrade Faculty of Security Studies
- Belgrade School of Electrical Engineering
- Belgrade University Library
- Third Belgrade Gymnasium
- Zemun Gymnasium

== Civil buildings ==
- Avala TV Tower
- Belgrade Fair - Hall 1
- Belgrade Tower
- Beograđanka
- BIGZ building
- Dom Sindikata
- Eastern City Gate
- Gardoš Tower
- General Post Office
- PRIZAD building
- Sava Center
- Sava City
- Serbian Journalists’ Association Building
- Ušće Tower
- Veljković Family House
- Vučo House on the Sava River
- Western City Gate
- West 65

== Historical buildings ==
- Agrarian Bank Building
- Archives of Yugoslavia
- Beli Dvor (White Palace)
- Belgrade Meteorological Station
- Belgrade Planetarium
- Captain Miša Mansion
- Dedinje Royal Compound
- Despot Stefan Tower
- Dositej Lyceum
- First Serbian Observatory
- First Town Hospital
- General Staff Building
- Government Building
- Hammam of Prince Miloš
- House of the National Assembly
- Ilija M. Kolarac Endowment
- Jovan Cvijić House
- Kraljevski Dvor (Royal Palace)
- House of Flowers
- Main Post Office Palace
- Mehmed Paša Sokolović Fountain
- Military Hospital
- Mika Alas House
- Ministry of Foreign Affairs Building
- National Theatre
- National Bank Building
- Nebojša Tower
- Nikola Pašić House
- Nikola Spasić Endowment
- Novi Dvor (New Palace)
- Officers Club
- Old General Staff Building
- Palace Albania
- Residence of Prince Miloš
- Residence of Princess Ljubica
- Ruski car Tavern
- Russian Center of Science and Culture
- Saint Sava House
- Serbian Academy of Sciences and Arts
- Seismological Institute Building
- Spirta House
- Stari Dvor (Old Palace)
- Vuk Foundation House

== Hotels ==
- Aleksandar Palas Hotel
- Crowne Plaza Belgrade
- Hotel Bristol
- Hotel Jugoslavija
- Hotel Moskva
- Metropol Palace Hotel
- Queen's Astoria Design Hotel
- Slavija Hotels

== Museums ==
- National Museum of Serbia
- Belgrade City Museum
- Museum of Contemporary Art
- Museum of Applied Arts
- Museum of Natural History
- Museum of Theatrical Arts of Serbia
- Museum of African Art
- Historical Museum of Serbia
- Museum of Yugoslavia
- Nikola Tesla Museum
- Railway Museum
- Aeronautical Museum
- Ethnographic Museum
- Military Museum
- Jewish Historical Museum

== Religious buildings ==
- Church of Saint Sava
- Church of Saint Mark
- Cathedral of Saint Archangel Michael
- Church of the Ascension
- Palace of the Patriarchate
- Bajrakli Mosque

== Sports buildings ==
- Belgrade Arena
- Ranko Žeravica Sports Hall
- Tašmajdan Sports and Recreation Center

== See also ==
- Architecture of Belgrade
- Architecture in Serbia
- List of tallest structures in Serbia
