= Astronomy in Serbia =

Astronomy in Serbia is developed in accordance with the country's economic capabilities, or even slightly above them. Astronomical Observatory Belgrade (on Zvezdara), founded in 1887, is one of the oldest scientific institutions in Serbia. Serbia is a member of the International Astronomical Union since 1935.

Astronomical Observatory Belgrade remains the only professional observatory in Serbia. The observatory has eight professional telescopes, and is currently completing a new station on the mountain Vidojevica near Prokuplje. There are also several smaller public and university observatories: the Public Observatory in Belgrade, Novi Sad Astronomical Observatory and Belerofont Observatory in Kragujevac. There are two planetariums: in Belgrade and Novi Sad.

Astronomy is taught in primary and secondary schools, but only as a part of other courses. Of great importance in teaching of astronomy is the Petnica Science Center. Five universities in Serbia offer the studies of astronomy: universities of Belgrade, Novi Sad, Kragujevac, Niš and Priština. From these, at the University of Belgrade have so far graduated 242 astronomers, and 6 astronomers at the Novi Sad; 4 more astronomers who have graduated abroad are working in Serbia.

Several journals devoted to astronomy are published: Astronomija, (discontinued since 2009), Vasiona and others. Also, since 1936, a scientific journal, Serbian Astronomical Journal is published.

In Serbia there are 17 associations of amateur astronomers, the oldest of which is Astronomical Society Ruđer Bošković.

== See also ==
- Science in Serbia
- Serbian folk astronomy
