= Veljković Family House =

The Veljković Family House
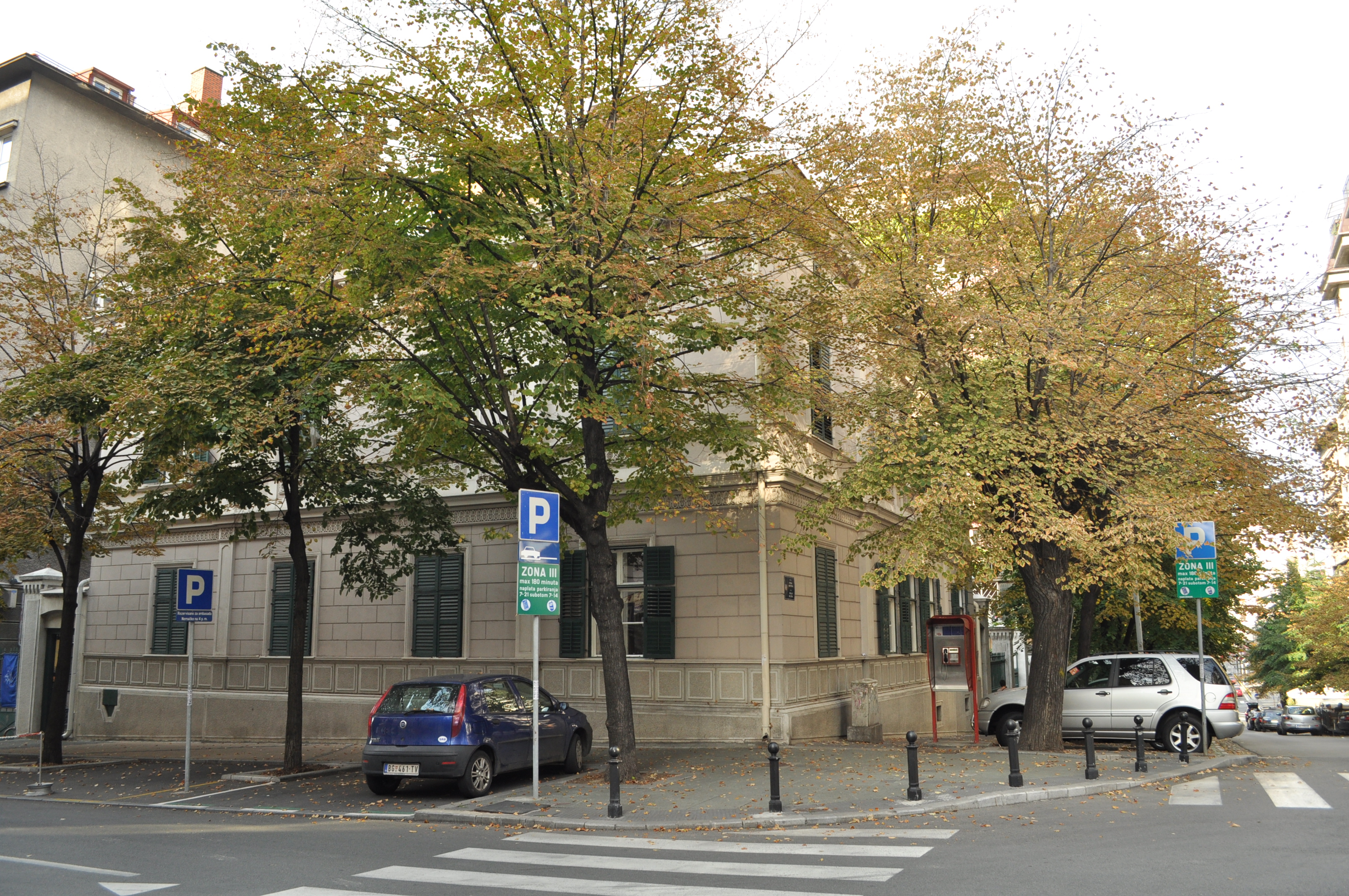
- Veljković Family House

- Location within Belgrade

General information
- Status: Cultural Heritage
- Location: Belgrade, 21 Birčaninova Street, Savski Venac, Serbia
- Coordinates: 44.8021°N 20.4637°E
- Completed: 1883

Website
- beogradskonasledje.rs

The Veljković Family House (Serbian: Кућа породице Вељковић, romanized: Kuća Porodice Veljković) is a historic building that hosts frequent cultural events and exhibitions in central Belgrade, Serbia, Built in 1883 in the style of 19th century academism, it was the historical seat of the elite Veljković family, and initially known for its interior architecture (including a private library) and 1931 art pavilion (comprising the family's collection of paintings and sculptures, a collection of arms, and other items). Plundered and half-destroyed in 1944 by Soviet occupation forces and then seized by the communist Yugoslavian state, its garden became the site of the East German Embassy while the house remained neglected for four decades, until renovation work begun by the family in 1991 was completed in 2007.

It is now a designated cultural property (Reg.No.SK92), and became an associated member of the European Historic Houses Association in 2016.

== House origins ==
The house's title deed shows that the first known owner of the property lot was Marko Čolić, who sold it in 1866 to the telegrapher Kosta Lazarević from Smederevo, although there is no data about the number and the appearance of its buildings at that time. In 1873, the property was resold to manufacturer Franjo Všetački and his wife Ruža, and the new (present) house that they had built there was purchased by Stojan Veljković in 1883. The original blueprints for the new two-story family mansion, as well as the names of the architect and the contractor, were not saved but it is assumed, based on the title deed, that the house was erected in the period between 1873 and 1882.

Stojan Veljković (1831-1925), judge and politician, was the son of Jovan Veljković (1795–1874), a military commander and minister from the time of the second government of Prince Miloš. Stojan received his law doctorate from Heidelberg in 1854 and became a professor of Belgrade Lyceum and Belgrade Higher School, and then President of Serbia's Court of Cassation for several periods and, as one of the leaders of the Liberal Party in the 19th century, Serbia's Minister of Justice in 1871-73 and 1879-80. A member of the Society of Serbian Literature, the Serbian Learned Society and an honorary member of the Serbian Royal Academy, Stojan retired from public life in 1903 when the Constitution of 1901 and the Senate, of which he was the first vice president, were both abolished.

Upon Stojan's death in 1925, the house was inherited by his son Vojislav Veljković (1865-1931), the founder of the Serbian Literary Herald and a former Minister of Finance (1919-20) of the Kingdom of Yugoslavia, known as "the father of the Yugoslav golden Dinar" and an avid art collector.

== Museum building and art collection ==
In 1931, Vojislav Veljković petitioned Pope Pius XI for permission to use the lost-wax method to make bronze casts of 21 of Michelangelo's original sculptures, including the colossal figure of Moses on the Tomb of Pope Julius II. The Pope's approval was granted on the condition that Veljković would fashion a suitable space with a climate control system that would ensure the internal temperature would be kept within one degree Celsius throughout the year, to prevent deformation of the bronze over time. Veljković therefore initiated the construction of a modern exhibition pavilion in the courtyard of the family house in the Yugoslav capital, resulting in the first private museum building in Southeast Europe. He named it Museo, though it would later become colloquially known as the Veljković Pavilion.

Built after a design by architect Vojislav Đokić and engineer Aleksandar Gavrilović, the pavilion measured 255 m2 in area, with a glass roof conceived along modernist principles, and was intended specifically for the display of paintings and sculptures, with a special device for mounting the paintings and pedestals. The building also featured the first modern HVAC system installed in Southeast Europe.

Once the Pope approved the petition, the Paris foundry Susse Frères was commissioned to produce the casts, and certificates of authenticity were issued by the Vatican. Unfortunately, Veljković died before the new museum was finished, but his brother Jovan saw the project through and in 1934 Museo was opened to the public twice a week. In addition to the cast of Moses, the pavilion exhibited over 250 other art pieces, including casts of four other Michelangelo originals—Day, Night, Dying Slave, and Rebellious Slave—several paintings by Uroš Predić, Paja Jovanović, Sava Šumanović, Nadežda Petrović, and Marko Murat, a set of caricatures by Beta Vukanović, a cast of Jean-Antoine Houdon's Voltaire, and a number of antique sculptures.

The Axis invasion of Yugoslavia in World War II led to the immediate closure of Museo. During the occupation, the Germans did not plunder the collection but it began to be plundered in 1944 when Soviet forces requisitioned and party destroyed the family's 'surplus rooms' in the main house.

After the war, with the League of Communist's takeover of Yugoslavia, the museum and the remaining art pieces were nationalised by the state. The building was first given as an atelier to painter and politician Moše Pijade, who became president of the Federal Parliament in 1954, and then to the sculptor Sreten Stojanović, who became the first principal of the Art Academy in 1957, and eventually converted to a shoe and leather storage by the Municipality of Savski Venac. All the paintings from the collection, as well as a few statues, went missing during this period, but the bronze casts of Michelangelo's works were transferred to the Academy of Fine Arts, which later evolved into the Faculty of Fine Arts of the University of Arts in Belgrade. They were stored at Toma Rosandić's workshop in the Topčider neighbourhood, a location which later become the seat of the Faculty's sculpture department. Today, the cast of Moses is still on display there.

== House post-war ==
Along with the pavilion lost when all property was nationalised by the new Communist state after World War Two, the house's large garden was confiscated and redeveloped to become the site of the East German Embassy and the rooms of the house itself were tenanted out for decades in an increasingly poor condition. Vojislav Veljković emigrated in 1953 with his wife Ljudmila and children Bogdan and Katarina after refusing to join the Communist party, but the house remained under the custody of a relative who lived in the kitchen as his only dwelling. He fought to save the house, as well as some remaining pieces of furniture, and prevented tenants' efforts to make partitions in the rooms, and eventually succeeded in getting the façade of the house protected by Decision No.63/5 of the Institute for the Protection of Cultural Monuments of Serbia on 30 April 1967.

When Vojislav Veljković's children Bogdan and Katarina returned to Belgrade in 1991, they found the interior of the house devastated. They started a step by step restoration using their own funds, but also began the struggle to find extremely valuable works that disappeared after the war.

I found the house in a very bad condition, the roof was leaking, and as various tenants left it and vacated the rooms, we started fixing it up. Unfortunately, many valuable things have disappeared, and mostly bulky furniture remains, which needs to be restored. Among the display cases and cupboards, Mina Karadžić's broken piano remained, which, after her death, Vuk Karadžić gave to Vojislav Veljković. In the house, there is also a photograph of the portrait of Čukun-grandfather Jovan Veljković, the son of the prince of the Nahija of Paračin, which was first stolen, and then bought by an antiquarian and sold to the National Museum, where it is still located today. Out of 120 paintings that our family owned, we managed to find only 20 works.

— -Katarina Veljković, Politika (24 September 2007)

In 2001 I got the permission of the Institute for the Protection of National Heritage to restore and remake the façade, but we had no funds anymore. Thanks to the Secretariat of Community Affairs, after preparing all necessary papers and a lot of bureaucratic entanglement, I succeeded in including our house in the Program of rehabilitation of facades of the City of Belgrade. The works were completed in 2007.

— -Katarina Veljkovic Beigbeder, European Heritage Days website (2019)

== Legacy ==
The house of the Veljković family is now considered an example of the development of 19th century urban architecture and the European stylistic models being adopted as part of the modernization of Serbian society at the time. Designated as a cultural property for its cultural, historical architectural and townscape values, the Veljković Family House was opened for hosting Serbian and European cultural events in 2006.

On 10 October 2012, working with co-founders the Marković family and the Šećerović and Conić families, the Veljković family created a new association, Old Houses of Serbia (Serbian: Stare Kuće Srbije), and in 2016 the association became a member of the European Historic Houses Association which the Veljković Family House supports in an annual programme of events.

== See also ==
- List of buildings in Belgrade
