= Daniel Cardon de Lichtbuer =

Belgian businessman (1930–2022)

Daniel Baron Cardon de Lichtbuer
- Born: 16 November 1930; Brasschaat, Belgium
- Died: 26 July 2022 (aged 91)
- Education: Catholic University of Louvain
- Occupation: Businessman
- Board member of: International Centre for Missing & Exploited Children (ICMEC)
- Awards: Baron (ennobled by King Albert II; 1998); Commander of the Order of the Crown (Belgium); Officer of the Order of Leopold II; Knight of the Order of Léopold; Officer of the Italian Order of Merit; Member of the Royal Academy of Economic and Financial Sciences of Spain

Daniel, Baron Cardon de Lichtbuer (16 November 1930 – 26 July 2022) was a Belgian businessman, mainly active in the Belgian banking sector.

== Education ==
He obtained a PhD degree in law (1953) and an MBA degree (1955) from the Catholic University of Louvain.

== Career ==
Cardon started his career as an assistant to the dean of the School of Business administration at the University of Louvain 1955/1958. In 1958 he joined the European Commission in Brussels as one of their first international civil servants. From 1960 to 1967 he was head of the staff of Albert Coppé, vice-president of the High Authority of the European Coal and Steel Community and from 1967 to 1973 he was head of the Cabinet of the Belgian European Commissioner. In 1973 he received the title of honorary director general of the European Commission. He started his banking career at the Bank Brussels Lambert in 1973, where he became president and CEO in 1992 and upon his retirement in 1996 was made honorary president. He was also chairman of the board of Nationale Suisse Belgium (insurance) and vice president of Bank Liechtenstein. He had been the president of the Association of the Belgian Bankers, vice president of the Belgian Employers Federation, chairman of the board of Thomas Cook Traveller Cheques, president of the European Financial Marketing Association (Paris) and member of the board of AVIS Europe (London).

Besides his professional activities, he was also executive president of Europa Nostra, the Federation of the European Heritage Organisations, and was the honorary executive president and president of the Royal Historic Houses & Gardens Association of Belgium and governor of the European Historic Houses Association.

Cardon was the honorary president of the European League for Economic Cooperation (ELEC), and had been vice president of the European Movement. He was a member of the business club Cercle de Lorraine.

== Philanthropy ==
Cardon was a member, and former chairman, of the board of directors of the International Centre for Missing & Exploited Children (ICMEC), a global nonprofit organization that combats child sexual exploitation, child pornography, and child abduction.

In July 1997, Daniel Cardon de Lichtbuer became the first chairman of Child Focus (the Belgian Center for Missing and Sexually Exploited Children) and was president founder of Missing Children Europe.

== Honors ==
In 1998 Cardon was ennobled as Baron by King Albert II. He was also Commander of the Order of the Crown (Belgium), Officer of the Order of Leopold II, Knight of the Order of Léopold, and Officer of the Italian Order of Merit. Furthermore, he was a member of the Royal Academy of Economic and Financial Sciences of Spain and was recipient of the Hope Award 2003 for Global Vision (U.S.).
