= List of hotels in Serbia =

This is a list of what are intended to be the notable top hotels in Serbia, five or four star hotels, notable skyscraper landmarks or historic hotels which are covered in multiple reliable publications. It should not be a directory of every hotel in Serbia.

== Belgrade ==
Name	Image	Location	Summary and references
Aleksandar Palas Hotel		Belgrade	The Aleksandar Palace, which refers to itself as "[the] leading hotel in Macedonia", is centrally located and close to many cultural and historical locations in the city.
Hotel Astoria		Milovan Milovanović Street No.1, Belgrade	
Hotel Bristol		Belgrade	
Crowne Plaza Belgrade		Vladimira Popovica 10, Belgrade	
Hotel Jugoslavija		Bulevar Nikole Tesle 3, Belgrade	
Hotel Moskva		Terazije square, Belgrade	
Metropol Hotel Belgrade		Belgrade	
Slavija Lux		Slavija Square, Belgrade	

== Niš ==
Name	Image	Location	Summary and references
Ambasador Hotel		Kralja Milana Square, Niš	
