= Old General Staff Building, Belgrade =

Government building in Belgrade, Serbia

Old General Staff Building
- Стара зграда Генералштаба
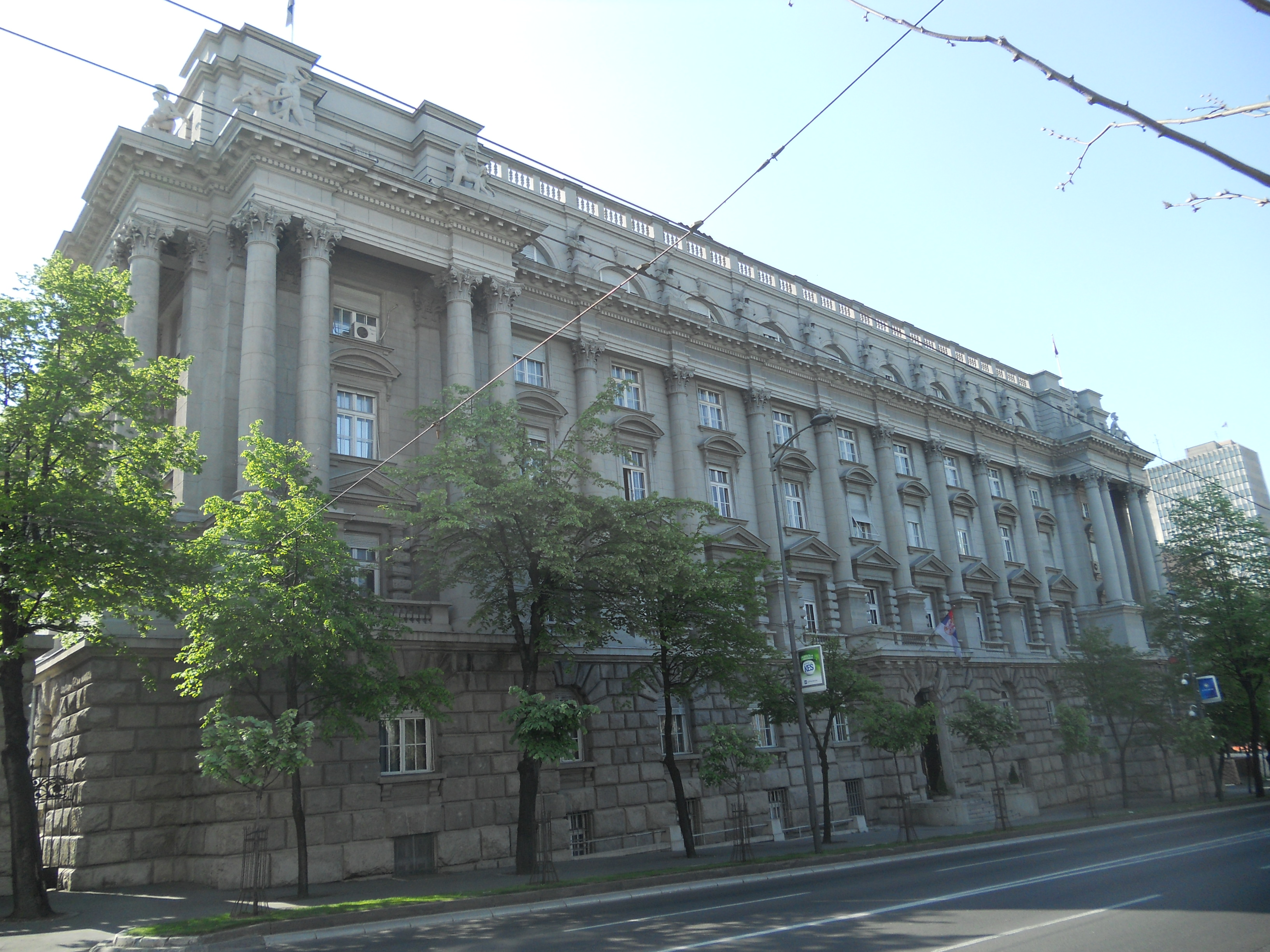

- Location within Belgrade

General information
- Location: 33 Kneza Miloša Street, Belgrade, Serbia
- Coordinates: 44.8064°N 20.4602°E
- Construction started: 1924
- Completed: 1928
- Renovated: 2008-2010
- Owner: Government of Serbia

Design and construction
- Architect: Vasily Wilhelm Baumgarten

The Old General Staff Building (Serbian: Стара зграда Генералштаба, romanized: Stara zgrada Generalštaba), also known as the Stone Palace (Serbian: Камена палата, romanized: Kamena palata) and the Baumgarten Palace (Serbian: Бомгартeнова палата, romanized: Bomgartenova palata), houses the Ministry of Defence of Serbia. It is located in Kneza Miloša Street, Belgrade.

== History ==
The period between the world wars in was marked by the erection of a large number of private and public buildings in Belgrade. In this period, the buildings were designed according to the academic concept, as monumental buildings with the symmetrical scheme of the basis, with tall columns and pilasters and other elements which represent the reminiscence to the historical styles, first of all classicism. In the late 19th century Europe the architecture of historical styles, which prevailed in the European architecture, underwent its transformation reflecting in the looser application of these styles. In Europe and in our country, the state institutions and rich investors played the important role in promotion of the architecture of historical styles. The monumental and decorative architecture were used to emphasize the power and the social position so the state and public buildings were built in this style, which became official. Technical High Schools and the Academies in the European centres contributed to the conformation and accreditation of the academic architecture based on the eclecticism as the style accepted by the state. Certain types of public buildings followed the established scheme and only individuals managed to achieve progress in creative and any other sense. Right in the period between the two wars, Belgrade begins to spread intensively. Monumental architectural masterpieces represented the confirmation and some kind of materialization of the new social reality created after the announcement of the Kingdom. After the World War I in Belgrade, the concentration of state administration made it political and administrative centre of the Kingdom of Yugoslavia. One after the other, the buildings of the state ministries were built in the Kneza Miloša Street and each subsequent building was bigger and more expensive than the previous one.

Building was built from 1924 to 1928 and was one of the most modern buildings in Europe compared to buildings intended for similar purposes (the army headquarters). In 1937, the building was declared the most beautiful building in Belgrade. The General Staff Building of Yugoslav Royal Army was one of the few buildings that Germans did not hit during the April bombing of Belgrade in 1941, although one of the first bombs fell only few metres from it, on the former building of the Ministry of War.

The Cultural Heritage Protection Institute of the City of Belgrade carried the reconstruction of the facades, the conservatory and restoration works in the interior (primarily the Warriors Hall), in the period from 2008 to 2010.

== Architecture ==
The Old General Staff Building represents one of the best examples of public buildings erected in Belgrade, in the style of academism. When it was erected, the Old General Staff Building was one of the most monumental and most expensive buildings with area of some on 9,500 sq meters. The architect, Vasily Wilhelm Baumgarten, realized many other important works, especially in the period between the mid-twenties and mid-thirties.

Since 1984 the building has been under the state protection and is inscribed on the list of cultural monuments.

=== Exterior ===
The facades were firmly composed and emphasized by the rhythmical row of columns with Corinthian capitols, doubled on the cornered projections. These columns take up three-storey height and bear a massive architrave flowing along all the facades and significantly stick out from the plane. Decorative structures in full plastic representing warriors and scenes from the warrior life are set up on the cornered projections above the architraved cornice. As a rule, the groups are two-membered and they represent: the fight of warriors, the warrior and the wounded, who kills the woman and himself, and the archer and the warrior with a sword. Each group repeats three times, so the compositions of four groups set up over the cornered projections are visible on all three corners of the facade. The author of these sculptures is the architect Ivan Rik. Being familiar with the Antique Sculpture of the classical period, Rik made the sketches in which the themes, the movement, the clothes and the weapons were precisely presented. These sculptures can be classified as the better designs of the decorative plastic on the facades of the buildings in Belgrade. The workshop of the Ivana Vanik and Milan Duhač worked on the processing of these facades, richly ornamented with architectural elements.

=== Interior ===
The interior of the Old General Staff Building is richly and carefully decorated. The walls, the floors and the ceilings were done in different materials and decorative elements mostly originating from the period of Antique and renaissance. It could be said that, by style, the interior is the closest to the Russian empire style, the prevailing style in the artistic circles in the first half of the 19th century. Although the building of the former Army Headquarters was designed a hundred years later, these influences were more than obvious. The assumption is that the author was inspired by some palace or public building from the Imperial Russia, the country of his origin. The entrance, the vestibule and the ceremonial hall were the most richly decorated. The central staircase at the entrance is flanked with the parapets, and two doubled columns rise up from there, bearing the coffered ceiling. The coffered ceiling is filled with floral rosettes. The ceiling in the longitudinal hall is decorated with the stucco and painted decorations with the motifs taken from the renaissance decorative program, the ceiling above the ceremonial bifurcated staircase is decorated with the medallions and ornaments of the floral origin. The central decorative motif of the entrance part is the monumental composition at the entrance door of the ceremonial hall. This entrance was decorated with double columns in articulated roughly hewn stone with the tympanum and the sculptural composition in the high relief, and which represents Samson and a lion. The composition Samson and a lion was done by Vladimir Zagorodnjuk, the author of decorative sculptures on many other buildings in Belgrade. The composition Samson and a lion personifies the power and the fight. It is thematically appropriate in that space. Formally, it was taken from the garden architecture of the late renaissance villas and in the interior it was inappropriately used.

==== Warriors Hall ====
The ceremonial hall, the Warriors Hall, represents an authentic masterpiece, with columns, above which there was a gallery with arch openings, where sometimes, if it was necessary, a choir was standing. It has side-mounted windows, with rhythmically arranged columns between them, with Corinthian capitols bearing the architraved cornice. Above the cornice there are warriors' busts, naked and in armour. The ceiling is decorated with medallions with floral elements, similar to the ceiling in vestibule. Above the entrance door the cartouche with military insignations bearing two female figures was set up. The overall internal decoration of the building was done by the workshop of Spasa Petrović. A very rich decoration and the use of luxurious materials testify about the great attention dedicated to the decoration of the Warriors Hall which belongs to the most decorated halls in Belgrade of that time. After the World War II the inadequate repainting of the stucco and painting decoration was undertaken. These works contributed to even more invasive appearance of the decorative interior.

== See also ==
- List of buildings in Belgrade
