= Gardoš Tower =

Memorial tower in Zemun, Belgrade, Serbia

- Кула Гардош, Миленијумски Споменик; Кула Сибињанин Јанка
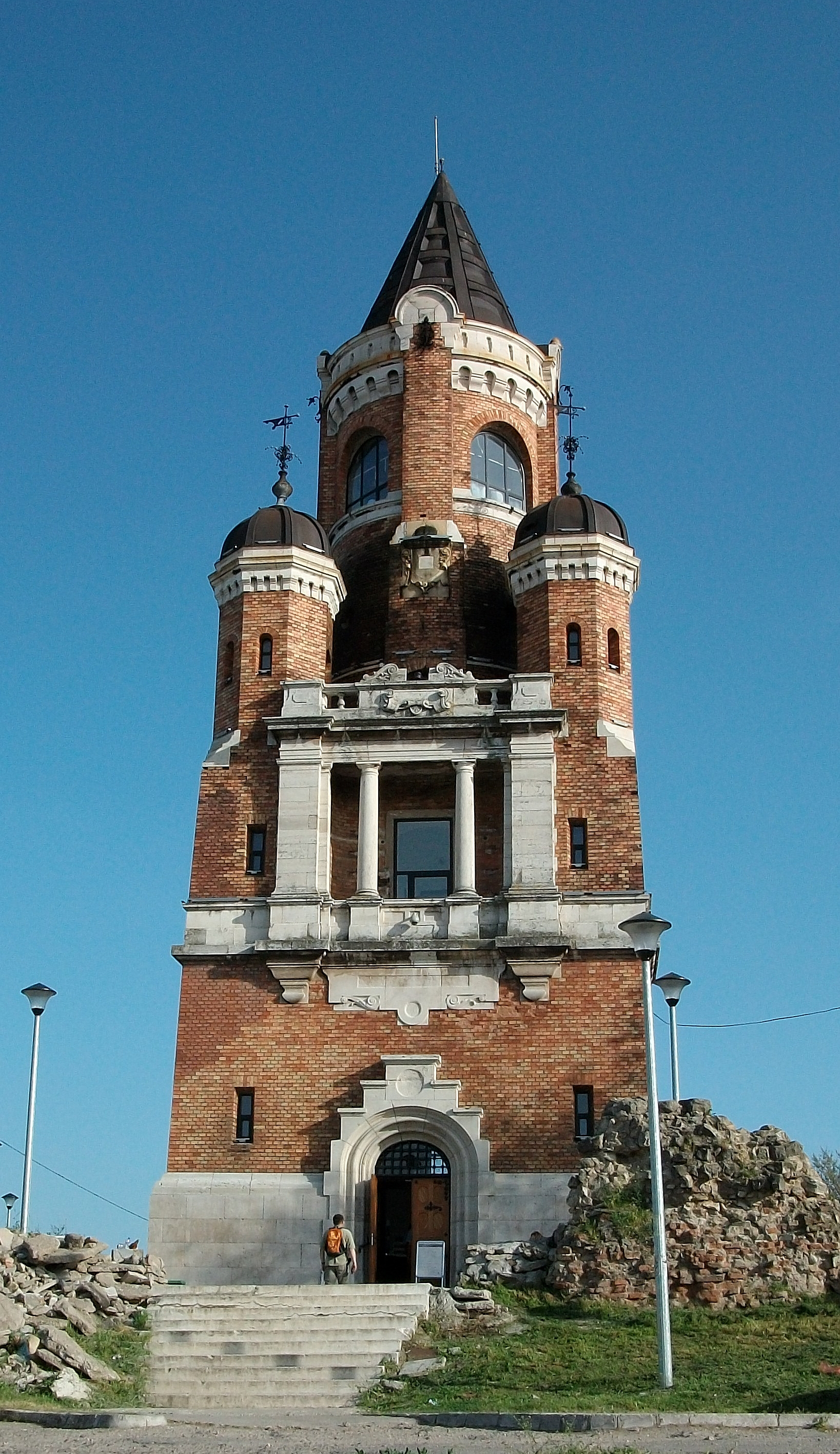
- Gardoš Tower in 2013

- Location within Belgrade
- Alternative names: Millennium Tower; Tower of John Hunyadi

General information
- Location: Zemun, Belgrade, Serbia
- Coordinates: 44°50′54.0″N 20°24′35.1″E
- Completed: 5 August 1896
- Inaugurated: 20 August 1896
- Renovated: 2006-2010

Height
- Height: 36 m (118 ft)

Dimensions
- Diameter: 18 m (59 ft)

Website
- www.kulanagardosu.com

The Gardoš Tower (Serbian Cyrillic: Кула Гардош), also known as Millennium Tower (Serbian Cyrillic: Миленијумски Споменик) or Tower of John Hunyadi (Serbian Cyrillic: Кула Сибињанин Јанка, The Tower of John Hunyadi) is a memorial tower located in Zemun, city of Belgrade, Serbia. It was built and officially opened on 20 August 1896 to celebrate a thousand years of Hungarian settlement in the Pannonian plain. The Millennium project included seven monuments in total all over the Hungarian part of Austro-Hungary, with Gardoš Tower being the southernmost; the others were at Budapest, Brassó (now Brașov in Romania), Dévény (Devín in Slovakia), Munkács (Mukachevo in Ukraine), Nyitra (Nitra in Slovakia), and Szeged. They were all different, including obelisks and columns.

As part of Old Core of Zemun, and also located in the middle of the Zemun Fortress, tower is protected both as Spatial Cultural-Historical Unit of Great Importance, and as a Protected Monument of Culture. Though today usually considered by the Belgraders as part of the old Gardoš Fortress, on which remains it was built, the tower is some 5 centuries younger than the fortress.

== History ==
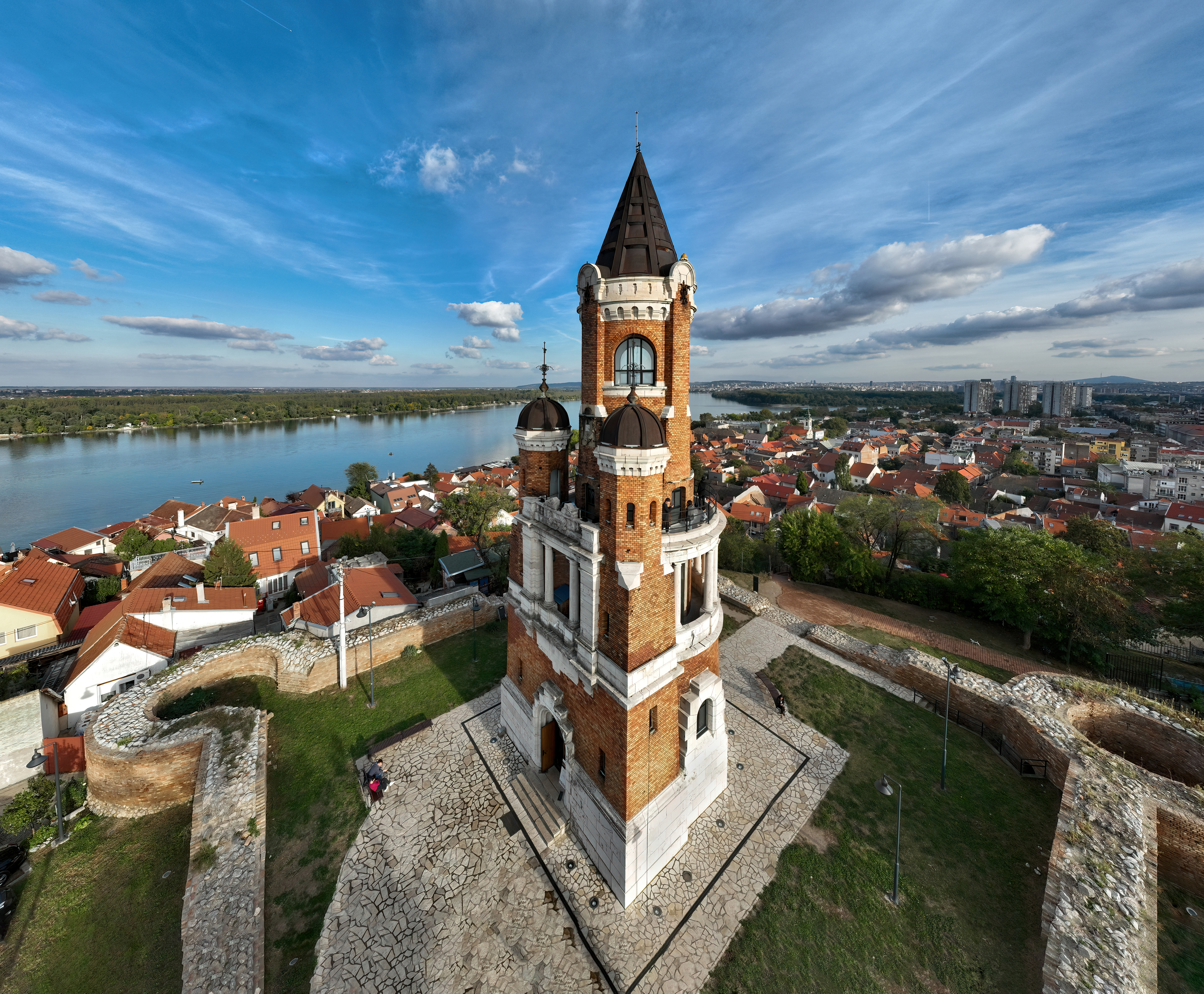
View to Gardoš Tower and Danube River.

During the archaeological surveys in 2012-2013, two excellently preserved Roman graves with numerous artifacts and intact skeletons were discovered. They are located near the base of the tower, between the eastern and southern tower of the original fortress, and were dated to the 2nd or the 3rd century AD. The skeletons were nicknamed "the oldest Zemunites".

The Gardoš Tower was part of the massive construction effort which included buildings in Budapest as well as four millennium towers on four directions of the world. Being the southernmost city in then Hungary within the Austria-Hungary, the tower was built on the ruins of the medieval fortress on Gardoš hill, Taurunum, which barely survived today (only angular towers and parts of the defending wall). The tower was built as a combination of various styles, mostly Roman. The tower is 36 m (118 ft) tall and, being a natural lookout, it was used by Zemun's firemen for decades. Today, the tower is named after John Hunyadi, who actually died in the old fortress, 440 years before the tower was built.

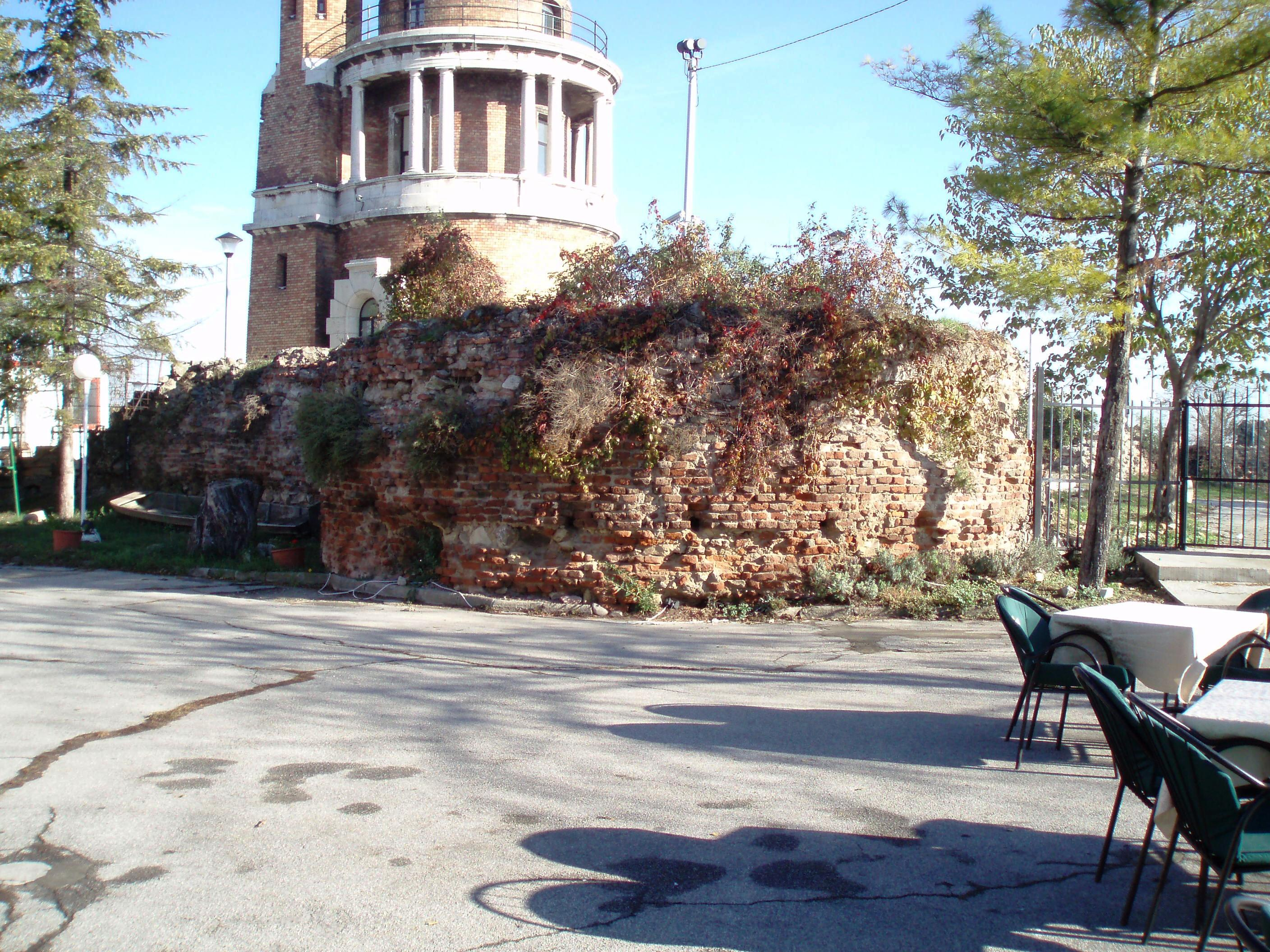
The remains of the medieval fortress of Zemun on Gardoš hill.

The tower was projected by the Hungarian architects. It was finished on 5 August 1896 and officially opened 15 days later. Soon after it was built, inhabitants of Zemun began to call it colloquially after John Hunyadi.

The tower was severely damaged in 1914 during the Austrian-Serbian fighting in the World War I, but was renovated during the Interbellum. This gave birth to one of the Zemun's urban myths. The lagums, or underground loess corridors of Zemun, their length and branching, are sources of numerous urban myths. One is that some lagums, originating from a cellar below the vertical stairs at the bottom of the Gardoš Tower, actually go all the way below the Sava river, crossing to Belgrade and connecting Gardoš Fortress with the Belgrade Fortress across the river. The story originated after the Austrians actually hit the tower in 1914, bombing it from the Danube. The left staircase which led to the cellar, collapsed. burying the cellar. Local population believed this was done on purpose by the Austrians, to hide the underground corridors. After the war, a tunnel was dug from the present ground-floor gallery into the buried cellar, but it turned out there were no corridors out of it. Still, the myth survives. It was also renovated in 1962.

By 2006, the tower was ruined. It lost all additional construction elements (doors, windows) and was cut from all communal networks (electricity, sewage, water). It became a gathering place for the local homeless people and drug addicts. The wife and husband gallerists Borka and Đorđe Čubrilo organized the initial cleaning and renovation of the tower. Several tons of garbage was taken out of the tower. The Čubrilo's rented the space and began reconstruction, per directives of the Institute for Protection of Cultural Monuments. Electricity was reintroduced and the floors and vertical staircases which leads to the scenic viewpoint were renovated. The right staircase is the original one, from 1896, which survived the 1914 bombing.

The floors and walls were also renovated, while the canal was dug to conduct the atmospheric water from the cellar. The almost completely destroyed main entry door was also repaired, as were the terraces of the tower and the ironworks. They were all reconstructed after the original schematics from 1896, which are kept in the Belgrade City Museum. The tower is embellished with decorative lights. The original, 2012 lights were replaced with the new ones in December 2019 as part of the wider reconstruction project for the entire fortress.

The Čubrilo's adapted the tower into an art gallery. Each year they organize exhibitions dedicated to the tower's revitalization. Exhibitions include some 8,000 photos taken by Đorđe Čubrilo since 2006, recording every step of the renovation.

The stairs which connect the tower plateau and the Gardoška Street has been named the Staircase of Professor Dabižić in September 2021. Miodrag A. Dabižić (1922-2017) was a historian and Zemun's chronicler.

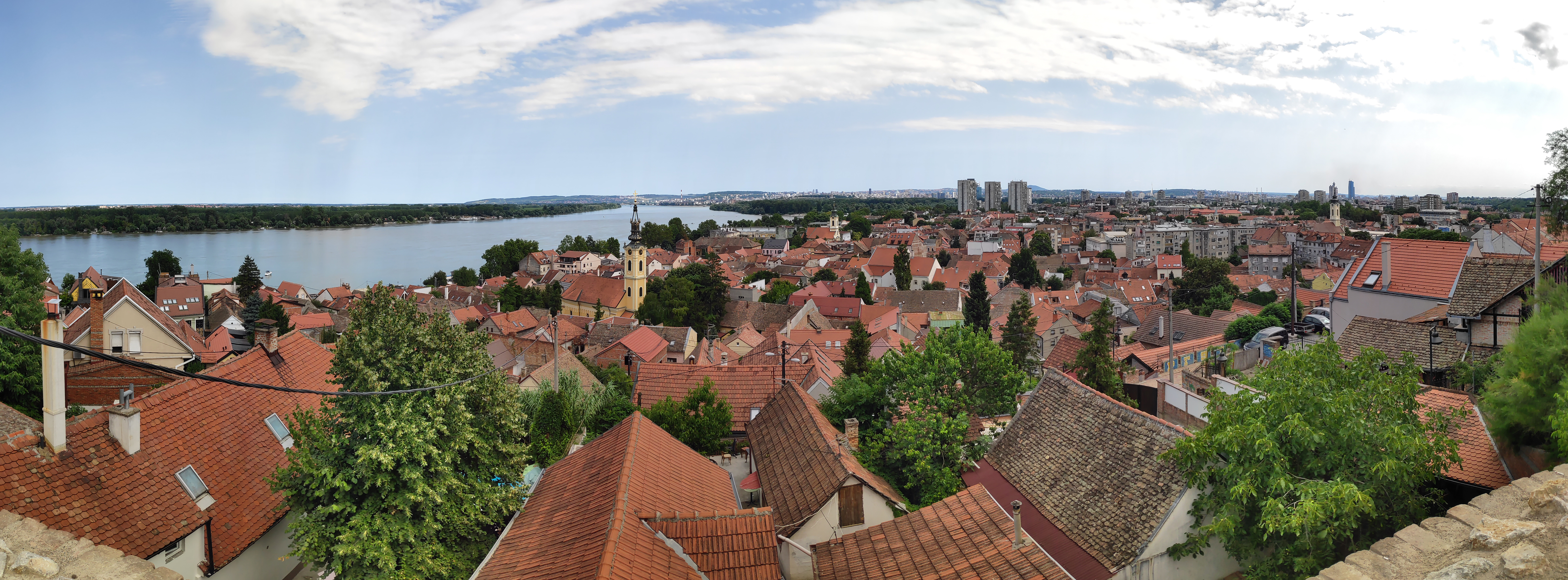
Panorama picture of Zemun and Danube from Gardoš Tower and hill

== Architecture ==
The tower is 36 m (118 ft) tall. It is 18 m (59 ft) in diameter at the base, but due to its design and the thickness of the walls, the interior at the same level has a diameter of only 6 m (20 ft). The tower gradually narrows on higher levels, so as the thickness of the outer walls, which is 1.4 m (4 ft 7 in) on the second floor and 0.8 m (2 ft 7 in) on the third.

It is built from sandstone and especially made hollow bricks, designed to put as much weight to the structure of the object as possible. Originally, an eagle was placed at the top of the tower, while each podest (rest area) had two sculptures, a lion and a coat of arms. Of all these ornaments, only one lion survived.

== See also ==
- Heroes' Square (Budapest)
- Palanok Castle
- Spatial Cultural-Historical Units of Great Importance (Serbia)
