= Serbian folk astronomy =

This article describes Serbian folk astronomy.

== Sun ==
In Serbian belief, the Sun is anthropomorphised as a man. Sometimes, the Moon is described as the Sun's brother or uncle, and Venus as his daughter or (in one song) wife, or both stars and Venus as his sisters. Of the Sun's parents, only his mother is ever mentioned.

Some common Proto-Indo-European beliefs about the Sun are preserved: a belief that the Sun is riding in a cart or on a horse, or that it is God's eye. Various beliefs exist that explain the Sun's role regarding day and night: that it travels underground or under the sea during the night to emerge again during the day, or that it dies every sunset to be born anew the next sunrise. The Sun is also present in a number of other folk beliefs and customs.

== Moon ==
The Moon is also anthropomorphised as a man. The Moon is sometimes described as Sun's brother or uncle, and Venus as Moon's sister or wife. Also, sometimes Moon's mother or children (mesečić) are mentioned, apparently not referring to any astronomical objects.

A great deal of attention in folk beliefs is given to Moon phases, with new Moon respected as bringer of good fortune, and full Moon also viewed positively. There are various explanations about the Man in the Moon, which is viewed as a head of an animal, or as a human.

== Venus ==
Depending on how it appears, Venus may be called differently:

- Danica - Day star, signifying that it could be seen during the day; Danica is also a female given name.
- Zornjača - Morning star, when it appears in the morning.
- Večernjača - Evening star, when it appears in the evening.
- Sometimes, Prehodnica or Preodnica - literally "crosser over", signifying that it appears on both sides of the sky (Eastern and Western) and the understanding that it crosses from one side of the sky to the other.

Venus is anthropomorphised as a woman, sometimes described as Sun's daughter or (in one song) wife, Sun's or Moon's sister, Moon's wife and in some songs as blood sister (posestrima) of Prince Marko. It is regarded as harbinger of dawn and day.

== Meteorites ==
Serbian mythical creatures called zmaj, usually translated as dragon, are described variously, as either snake-like monsters (see also aždaja), humans with supernatural abilities, or flying fiery creatures; these fiery dragons can be identified as meteorites. They are described as flying across the sky while shining, generally at night, with fire flowing from their wings, and producing a loud noise.

In some regions it was believed that a shooting star indicated a captive, slave or soldier had broken free, or that one man is chasing another to fight with. It was a custom that the person who saw the shooting star remained silent at that moment, as uttering a sound might disclose the fugitive. By another custom the person should say, "Behind a bramble, behind a bush, hide!", "Run to the mountain!" or similar.

== Stars ==
Stars are anthropomorphised as women, sometimes described as sisters of Sun and Moon. A variety of beliefs about them exist.

=== Sirius ===
Serbian name for Sirius is Svinjarka, Svinjaruša (svinja = pig), Volarica or Volujara (vo = ox). In some regions, appearance of Sirius signifies that pigs should be released to pannage on acorns.

== Asterisms ==
Big and Little Dipper are called Velika kola 'big cart' and Mala kola 'little cart' in Serbian. Another Serbian asterism is Porednice (red = 'queue'), identified as Orion's Belt and Sword. Other asterisms are recorded, such as Volovi 'oxen' and Trougao 'triangle', but it is unclear what stars they refer to.

== Pleiades ==
In Serbian, the Pleiades are called Vlašići or Sedam vlašića (sedam = 'seven'). While the name is identical to "Little Vlachs" 'Seven little Vlachs', this is a folk etymology, and it is in fact derived from Slavic god of cattle and underworld, Veles.

A number of stories about the Pleiade's origin exist. The stars are described as seven brothers, or six brothers and a sister. Several sets of their names are recorded, for example:

- Mika and Mioka, Raka and Raoka, Orisav and Borisav and seventh Milisav;
- Vole and Voleta, Rale and Raleta, Mile and Mileta and little Pržožak.

Pleiades are used to determine appropriate dates for various field works, or to measure time by night. Sometimes, when they appear on the sky, they are called kvočka s pilićima 'hen with chicklets'.

== Milky Way ==
In Serbian, the Milky Way is called Kumova slama 'godparent's's straw'. A legend explains that once, a godparent stole straw from another, but as he was carrying it away, he was losing some of it. Then, God put the straw in the sky as a permanent warning not to steal.

== See also ==
- Zorya
- Astronomy in Serbia

== Literature ==
- Janković, Nenad Đ. (1951). Астрономија у предањима, обичајима и умотворинама Срба (in Serbian). Belgrade: Serbian Academy of Sciences and Arts.
