= Nikola Pašić House =

Historic building in Belgrade, Serbia

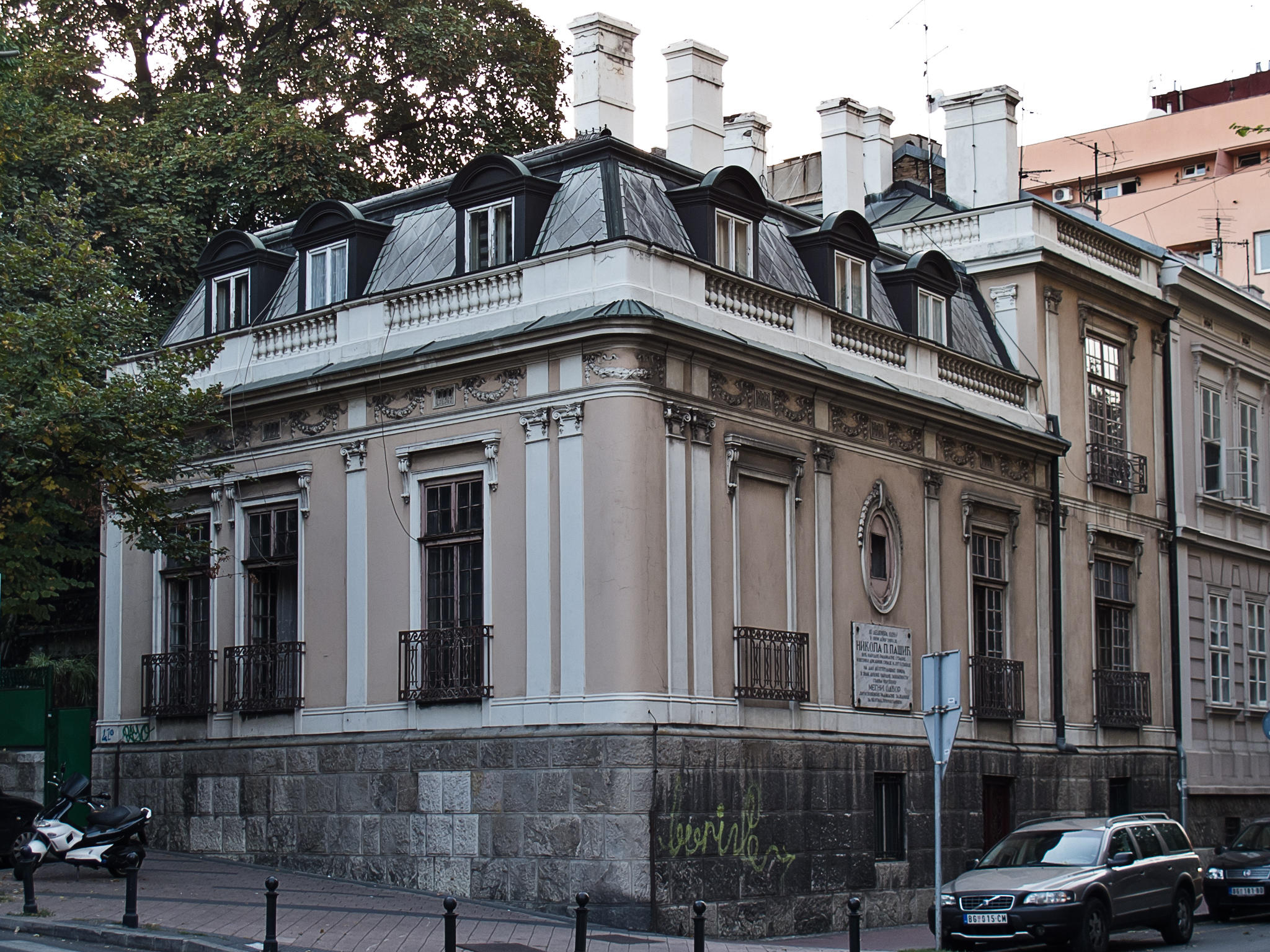
- Nikola Pašić's house
- Interactive map of the Nikola Pašić House area

General information
- Status: Cultural mounement
- Location: Belgrade, Serbia
- Coordinates: 44.8183°N 20.4634°E
- Completed: 1872

Website
- http://beogradskonasledje.rs/

Nikola Pašić House (Serbian: Кућа Николе Пашића, Kuća Nikole Pašića) is located at 21 Francuska Street, in Belgrade, the capital of Serbia. Originally built in 1872 and thoroughly expanded in 1921, it was purchased by the longtime prime minister Nikola Pašić in 1893. It was declared a cultural monument in 1984.

== Location ==
The house is located at 21 Francuska Street in downtown Belgrade, in the municipality of Stari Grad and the neighborhood of Upper Dorćol. It is situated below the Republic Square and the building of the National Theatre in Belgrade. In the vicinity are the bohemian quarter of Skadarlija, on the southeast, and the historical locality of Čukur Fountain, on the northwest.

== History ==
The house was built in 1872. It was made on the property of the Džango family. Brothers Nikola and Kosta Džango were well known luxury and industrial goods merchants (boltadžije) from Dorćol. After their deaths, the police of the Dorćol District organized a public auction for the house in 1893 and Pašić, until recently a prime minister, purchased it.

Pašić extensively expanded and upgraded the house in 1921, adding a new wing and the top floor. He explained that the works have been done using the assets from his wife's dowry, as his wife Đurđinka Duković came from the wealthy family of the grain merchants from Trieste, Italy. However, the public accused him that this is a result of a high corruption in his government, especially due to the financial machinations of his son, Radomir Pašić.

Pašić lived in the house for the rest of his life. He had an audience at the court of King Alexander and the king harshly refused to give him another mandate to form the government. 80 years-old Pašić suffered the stroke and died a day later, on 10 December 1926 in his house. Sculptor Đorđe Jovanović made the death mask of Pašić in the house and his body was embalmed there. Few hours after the news of his death, King Alexander and Prince Paul came to the house, so as the Patriarch of the Serbian Orthodox Church Dimitrije and all deputies from the National Assembly. The crowds of people gathered around the house to pay respect, jamming the Francuska Street, and in the end the gendarmerie had to intervene to keep the order in the neighborhood.

Commemorating 10th anniversary of his death, a white marble plaque was placed on the façade on 10 December 1936. It was placed by the local branch of the Yugoslav Radical Union with the inscription: On 10 December 1926 in this home died Nikola P. Pašić, leader of the People's Radical Party and great statesman of Serbia and Yugoslavia. On the day of the 10th commemorative anniversary, as a sign of deep national gratitude, this plaque is being placed by the Local Board of the Yugoslav Radical Union for Belgrade, Zemun and Pančevo.

Though it was suggested that it should be adapted and used for various official activities, as of 2018 the house was neglected, not being maintained since the early 1990s. In 2018, the house was purchased from Pašić's descendants who migrated to the United States long time ago. The reconstruction was to start right away, but it took two years to finish the paperwork, before the proper renovation began. In April 2021, media reported on fire in the Francuska Street, originally claiming that the Nikola Pašić's House was severely damaged. This was then refuted, as it was the neighboring, derelict house at No. which 19 actually burned. It was then made public that in several previous years the house has been burgled and vandalized numerous times, both by the local homeless people and by the transient migrants. The renovation is to be finished on 25 June 2021, when the house will be opened as the Memorial Home of Nikola Pašić.

== Architecture ==
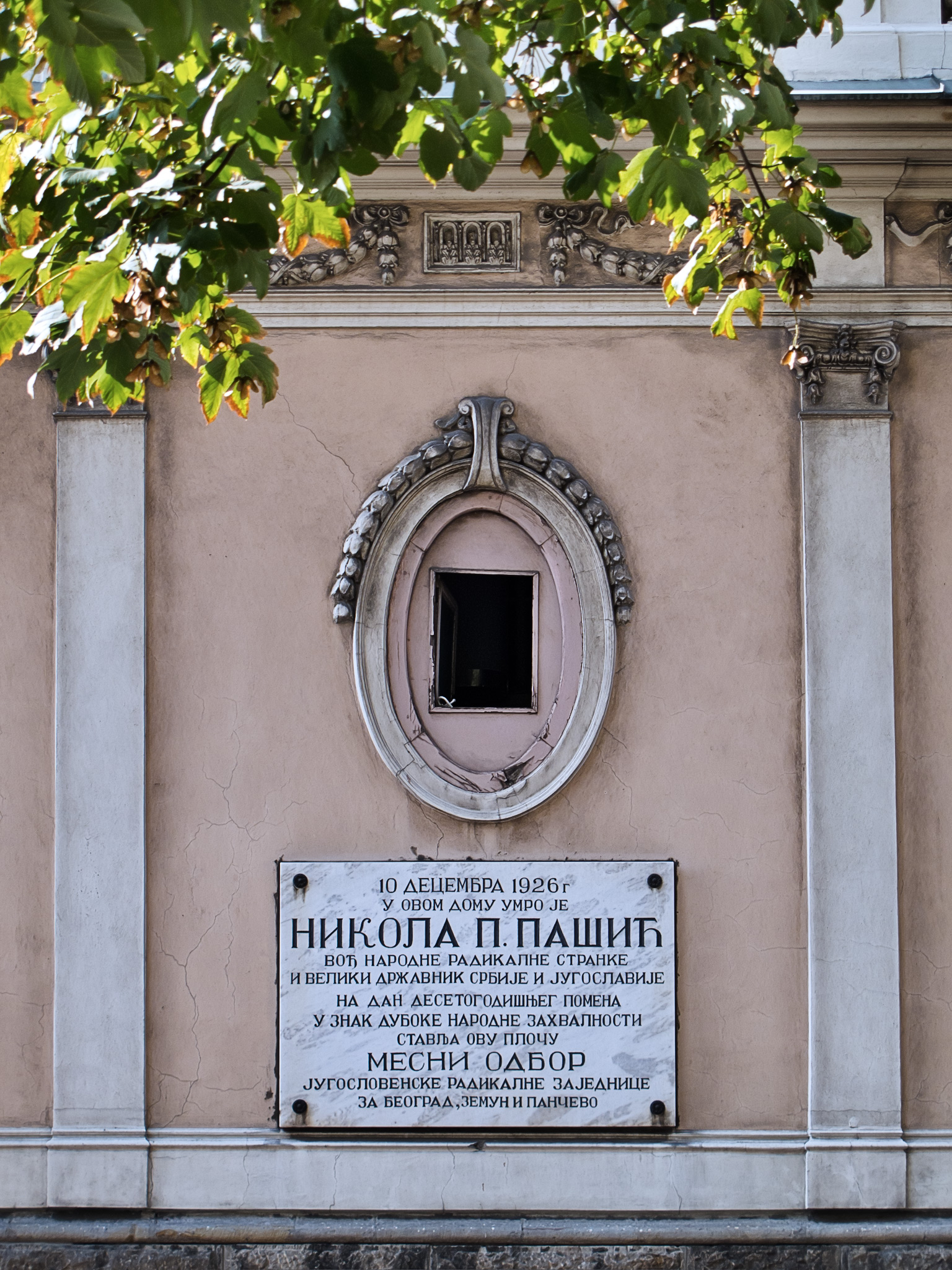
1936 memorial plaque under the façade decorations

The house was built as the corner house with the basement, ground floor and mansard as the humble, single-family house with the shaded garden. It was a typical town house of the second half of the 19th century. The house was erected on the already regulated lot enclosed with the present streets of Gospodar Jevremova, Francuska, Dositejeva and Simina.

The house was completely reconstructed during the Interbellum. After the thorough expansion which started in 1921, the house acquired today's appearance. The changes were based on the ideas of Pašić himself, who was a trained engineer who projected several buildings in Kruševac and Požarevac which still existed as of 2018, and on the project of architect Marijan Vujović. The edifice is adapted to match the status of the owner and architectural fashion of the time, so it was reshaped in the academic interwar architectural style. The total floor area of the expanded house is a bit under 600 square metres (6,500 sq ft).

The courtyard wing was added so that view on the inner yard was from the street was obstructed. An additional floor was added but only on one part of the house. Pašić continued to develop the house after 1921. Few years later the central heating was installed in the house, as well as the hot water supply. The façade plastics was added subsequently: pilasters, balustrades at the end of the first floor and the beginning of the mansard, ornaments above the openings, French style decorative fence, plaster garlands, etc.

The building was built with bricks. The ground floor was made of stone blocks, while the roof was covered with eternit panels. The fence facing the street was also made of stone blocks.

== Importance ==
The house was declared a cultural monument in 1984.

It importance stems from a fact that it was a home of a highly important person in the Serbian history. Apart from being Prime Minister and head of the People's Radical Party, Pašić was also Minister of the interior, Minister of the foreign affairs, acting Minister for construction and Minister for finance, President of the National Assembly, Mayor of Belgrade and Serbia's diplomatic envoy to Russia. Because of all that, the house was open for foreign statesmen, diplomats, reporters, in a word, famous local and foreign persons from the political and social life of Serbia and Europe.

Also, it documents the way of life of the rich urban families in Serbia at the time.

From the aspect of the cultural heritage, the construction of the house is related to the beginning of the organization of the old neighborhood of Dorćol and the streets regulation in this part of the town, after the idea of the first Serbian trained architect and urbanist Emilijan Josimović. The house represents the synthesis of different values, in urban position, distinctive architecture and interior, and especially in long-time dwelling and life of Nikola Pašić.

== See more ==
- Nikola Pašić
- List of buildings in Belgrade
