= Astronomical Society Ruđer Bošković =

Astronomical society in Belgrade, Serbia

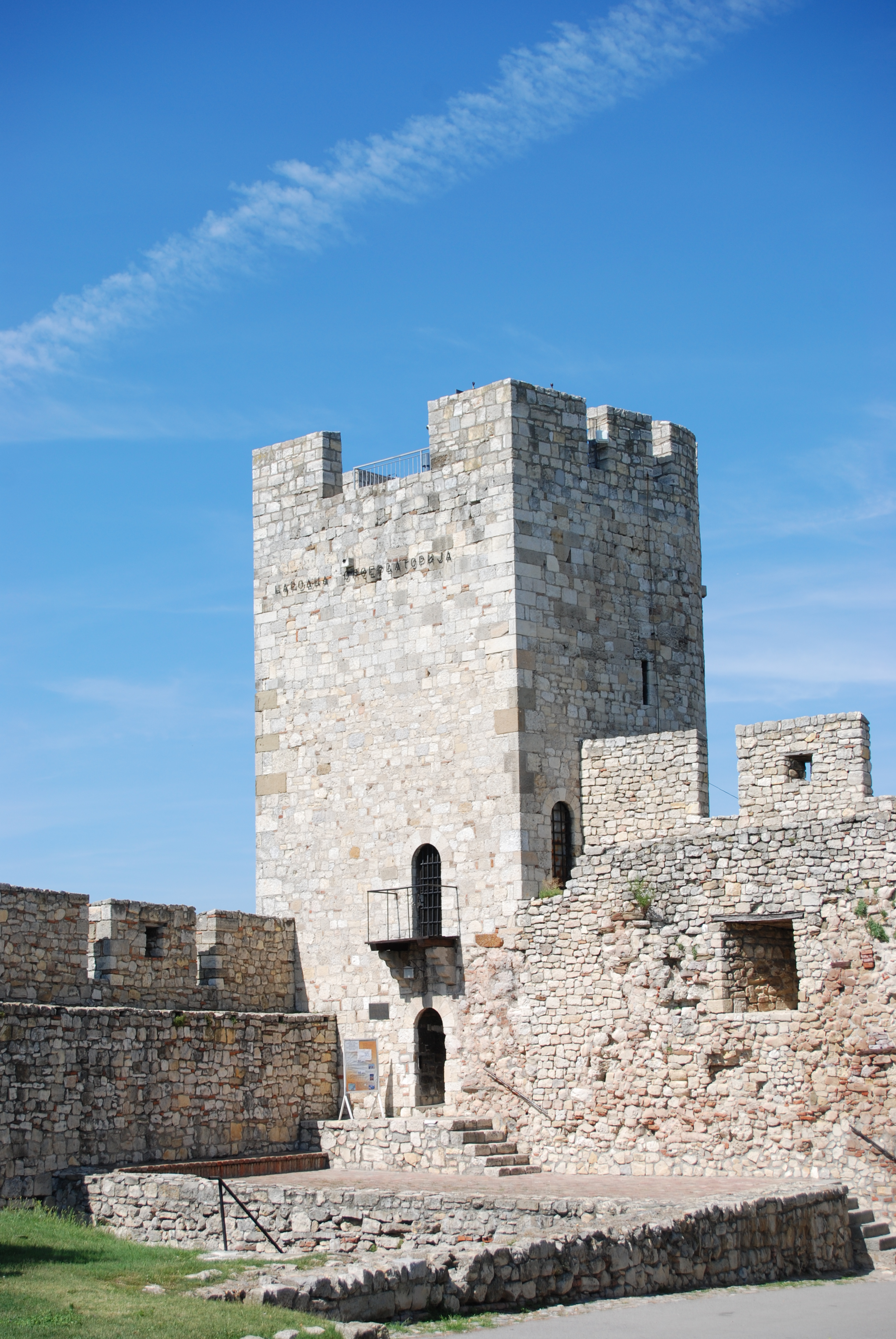
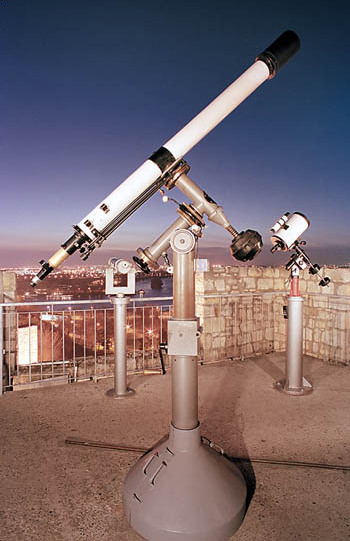
Left: Despot Stefan Tower in Belgrade Fortress, the seat of the Society
Right: Telescopes in the Public Observatory

Astronomical Society Ruđer Bošković (Serbian: Астрономско друштво Руђер Бошковић, romanized: Astronomsko društvo Ruđer Bošković) is an astronomical society in Belgrade, Serbia. Founded in 1934 by a group of students, it is the oldest one in the Balkans. Initially it had only a few members, but it now has more than 700. It is named after Ruđer Bošković.

The main role of the society is popularization of astronomy. The society also practices amateur astronomy observations. To accomplish this, in 1964, the Society founded the Public Observatory, which is still located in adapted Despot's Tower in Kalemegdan, Belgrade. The Belgrade Planetarium, one of the only two planetariums in Serbia, is also founded by the society, in 1970. It is located in the lower part of Kalemegdan Fortress, in a former hammam (Turkish bathhouse). The society has published a popular science magazine called Vasiona since 1953.

The fee to enter the tower for observations costs 400 dinars (about 4 dollars) but members enter for free.

Alongside them being able to enter for free, members also can come early to help with setup of the telescopes, as well come for advice/help with their own telescope.

== History ==
A group of students at the Belgrade University in 1934 decided to form an astronomical society focused on amateur observations and popularization of astronomy. Before the World War II, the society published magazine Saturn and organized popular lectures and a few observation trips. Thanks to the society's efforts, a translation of the book Stars and Atoms by sir Arthur Eddington was published. All activities of the astronomical society were banned by during the German occupation in 1941.

The society continued its work in 1953 as the Astronomical Society Ruđer Bošković, and began to publish the magazine Vasiona. Publication of books was also one of the society's main activities, and they had Ruđer Bošković's Eclipses of the Sun and the Moon (translated and commented by Nenad Janković) published.

In 1964 the society established the Public Observatory, located in the Despot's Tower in Kalemegdan. A Zeiss refracting telescope (110/2000) was placed at the terrace of the observatory and members bring their telescopes to the tower when more people come. The society also got a planetarium ZKP-2 in 1970 and opened the Belgrade Planetarium, with diameter of 8 m and 80 seats. The planetarium is mainly visited by the students of primary and high schools.

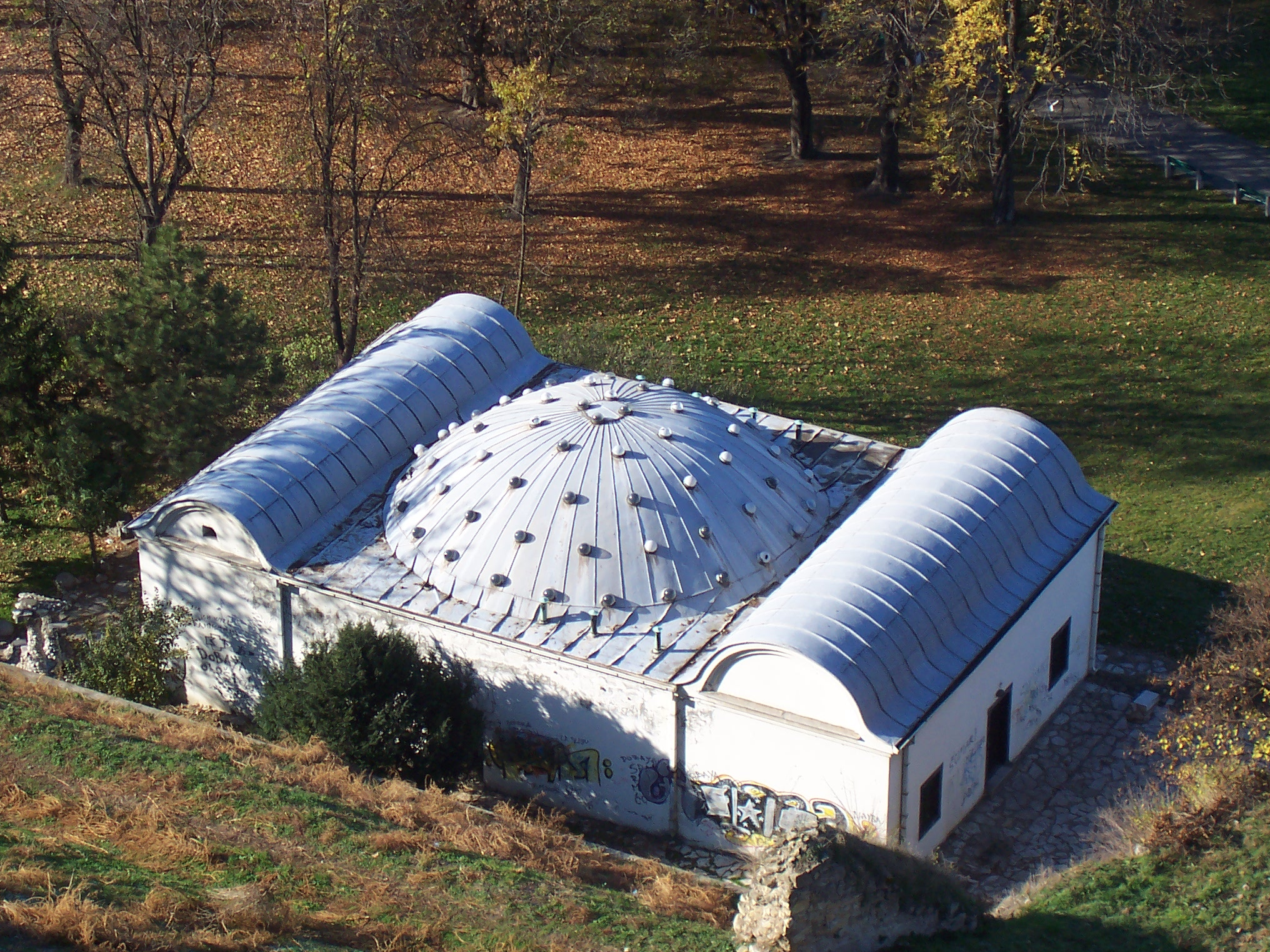
Belgrade Planetarium

During the 60s, 70s and 80s amateur astronomical observations of the Sun, occultations, binary and variable stars and planetary phenomena were regular. Too much light pollution around the Observatory in the last 5–10 years has limited the society's activities to more theoretical works and application of computers in astronomy, although observations of planets are held every Friday and Saturday. Every year the society organizes a few courses for the popularization of astronomy, such as: the Astronomy Course for beginners, held two times annually; Belgrade Astronomy Weekend (BAW) in June, consisting of several lectures on different topics; and Summer Astronomical Gatherings in August and September, with several lectures on similar topics. All courses are held in the society's planetarium.

State funding of the astronomical society permanently ended in 2010, and it is now primarily run by volunteers.

== See also ==
- Astronomy in Serbia
- Belgrade Planetarium
- Vasiona
- List of astronomical societies
