= Saint Sava House =

"Saint Sava" House
- Dom Svetog Save
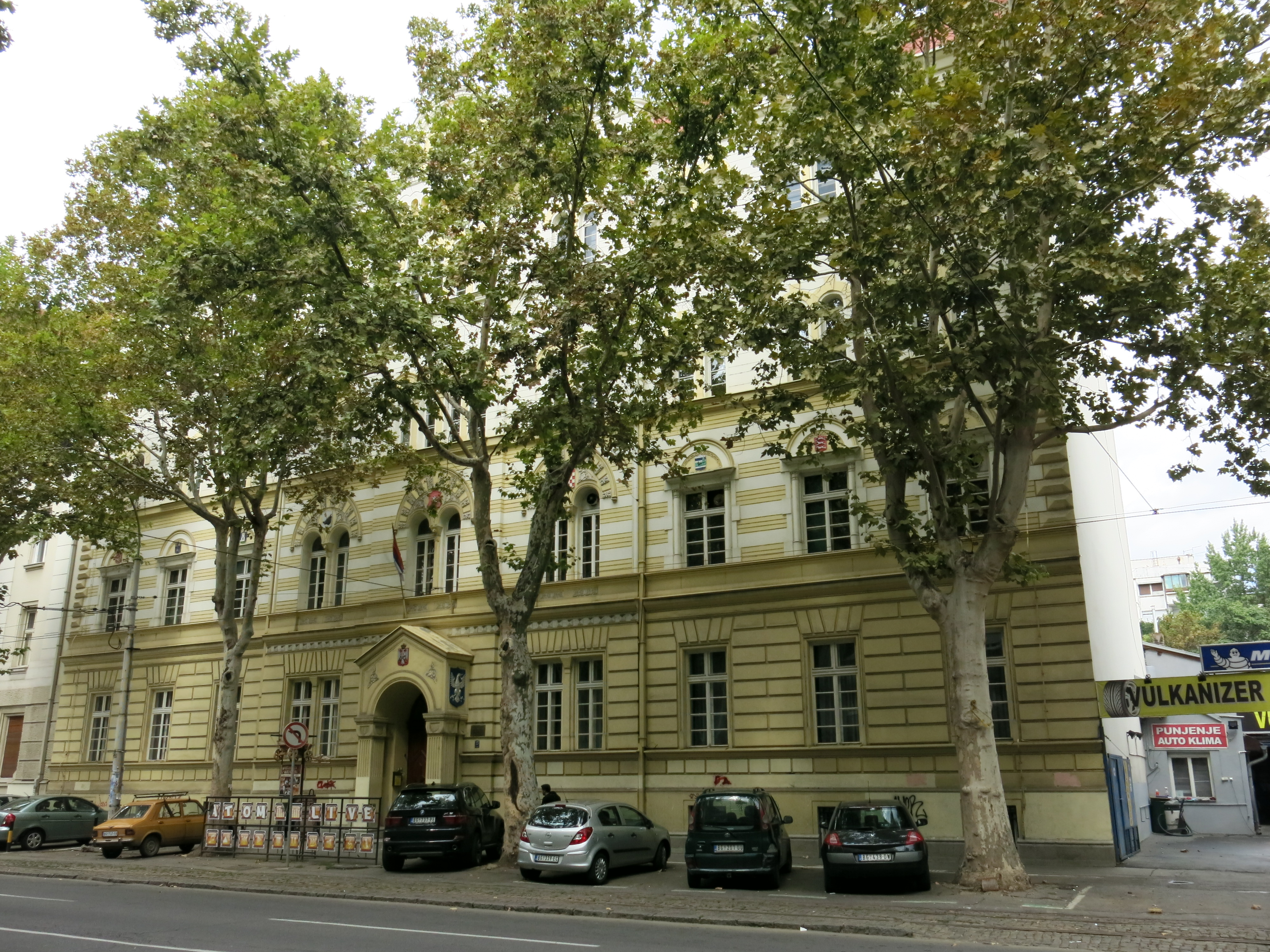
- "Saint Sava" House
- Interactive map of the "Saint Sava" House area

General information
- Type: Cultural monument
- Architectural style: Romanticism, neo renaissance
- Location: Cara Dušana 13,Belgrade, Serbia
- Coordinates: 44.8246°N 20.4581°E
- Construction started: 1890

Design and construction
- Architect: Jovan Ilkić
- Other designers: Jovan Heinrich Noken

"Saint Sava" House is in Belgrade, at 13 Cara Dušana Street; it was built in 1890. By its volume and architectural features, the building is an established cultural property and has the status of a monument of culture.

The name "Saint Sava" House is printed on the attic, on the main facade, above the middle of the avant-corps, which was designed by Dimitrije Naumović, Belgrade brazier, at his own expense.

Society of Saint Sava, also known as the St. Sava Society, founded in 1886 with the task of spreading education and national feeling of the people, raised the building of the St. Sava Building in 1890, intended for the storage of bodies and institutions of the society, designed by architect Jovan Ilkić. On 10 August 1889, the foundation stone was laid. The Company collected financial and material resources for the construction through contributions, organizing lotteries, organizing parties and loans. Therefore, the company also issued appeals. It sent letters to wealthy citizens. The press also helped by publishing and printing of various inscriptions with recommendations addressed to the patriotic public to that effect. Immediately after the opening ceremony of the building in 1890, the Management of the Company moved in, closely followed by the Saint Sava School and the Boarding School for Alumni of the Belgrade Trade Youth. Once, this building housed the state archives, school for the deaf of the Stefan Dečanski Society, First Belgrade Grammar School and others. Architect John Ilkić, in addition to drafting a plan and a bill, exercised construction supervision as well. St. Sava House is designed as a two-storey building with basement and ground floor. While the general concept of the building and the symmetrical composition of its main facade is based on academic principles, the facade is designed in the spirit of Romanticism, with elements of neo renaissance. The straight composed facade canvas is accented by the shallow central avant-corps, which finishes with an attic with a pyramidal dome in the area of the roof. The windows of the floors, designed as a two-light windows with arches, rely on cordon cornices, giving a romantic note to the entire facade. At the end of construction, the investor paid careful attention to the aesthetic appearance, decorations of the facade and interior furniture.

Coats of arms of South Slavic countries in the lunettes above the windows of the first floor were carved by Jovan Heinrich Noken after the drawings by the painter Đoka Jovanović. In the First World War, the building was used by the occupying authorities. Many things were taken away. With some changes in the appearance of the upper part of the main facade, a third floor was added to the building in 1923, designed by architect Petar Bajalović.
