= Old Core of Zemun =

Building in Zemun, Serbia

Old City Core

General information
- Location: Zemun, Belgrade, Serbia
- Construction started: XVIII
- Construction stopped: XIX

Website
- beogradskonasledje.rs

The Old Core of Zemun is the name of the historical part of Zemun, located in its central part. It represents a cultural and historical whole of exceptional importance, and the backbone of the cultural and social development of Zemun. In 1966, the area was declared a spatial cultural-historical unit, and placed under the legal protection.

== History ==
Since 1717, the army of Eugene of Savoy entered Zemun, which then became part of the Austrian Empire, in whose composition it developed until 1918. Its continued growth and development into a major urban environment can be traced through several stages limited by certain political events. In the first half of the 18th century, in the reconstruction phase of the former village of oriental character with a predominantly Christian population, Zemun was re-inhabited and developed in a very subordinate position in relation to Belgrade. This phase was limited by Požarevac and Belgrade Peace. In the second phase, in the second half of the 18th century, the core gradually grew and was formed. This phase ended in the period of the Austro-Turkish and the Napoleonic Wars in the late 18th and early 19th century. In the third phase, during the 19th and early 20th century, Zemun developed within the framework set by changing the construction fund, i.e. the reconstruction of inherited condition, from the First Serbian Uprising to the First World War. The fourth phase from the First World War, to date, is characterized by individual construction in Old Core of Zemun, which ceased to be a border place.

== Urban development ==
The existing urban agglomeration and architectural construction fund of the Old Core of Zemun are in themselves sources for the particular study and research on the development of methods of organizing and formation of the settlement, the construction of the object, the use of construction materials, municipal development, styles of buildings, functional, targeted and content features of architecture and spatial organization of life in general. Architectural heritage by which we mean the total physical fundus of spatial achievements, is also a source for the study of social differentiation and infrastructure of certain periods of growth, social possibilities, regional, ethnic and religious specificities, the taste of the epoch, and many other forms of life. The studies can be carried out by analyzing the material remains or continents created and saved for most of the early 18th century to today. Many buildings were preserved in their original condition, especially from the second half of the 19th century (like the Spirta House from 1855), while a smaller number of buildings from the earliest period, from the period of the first decades of the 18th century, when Zemun became part of the Austrian Empire, was only partially preserved in its original state. Chronology of the formation can also be partly determined by analyzes of the buildings, based on existing records on them, the material used and the method of construction, type and style analysis. Oral traditions of residents whose families inhabit the existing buildings from generation to generation, preserved items and inventory in houses expand the sources of tests. On the whole, the Old Core of Zemun is a basic, real source, particularly for architectural and artistic-historical research methods.
