= Serbian Journalists' Association building =

Building in Belgrade

Coordinates: 44.81°N 20.47°E

Serbian Journalists' Association Building
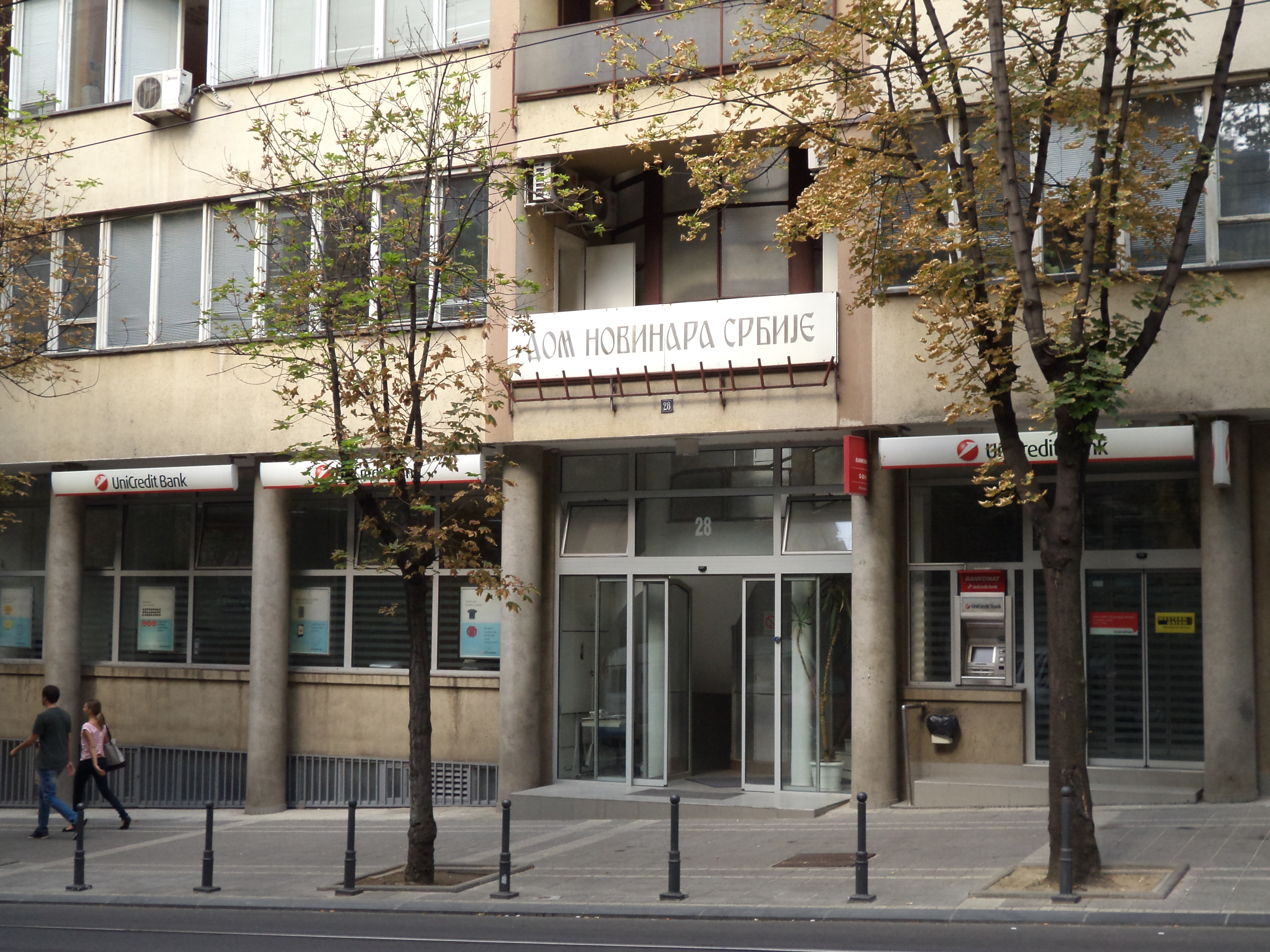
- Turgenjev Street in Belgrade
- Interactive map of the Serbian Journalists' Association Building area

General information
- Status: Cultural monument
- Location: Belgrade, Serbia, Vračar
- Completed: 1934

Website
- http://beogradskonasledje.rs/

The Serbian Journalists' Association Building (Serbian: Дом Удружења новинара Србије, romanized: Dom Udruženja novinara Srbije) is in Belgrade, in the territory of the city municipality of Vračar. It was built in 1934, and it represents an immovable cultural property as a cultural monument.

== Background ==
The Serbian Journalists' Association building was erected in 1934 in Vračar in Belgrade in 28, Resavska Street, as a project of the Croatian architect Ernest Weissmann (1903–1985). It was officially opened on 7 April 1935.

== Description ==
It is one of the most modern buildings in Belgrade, implemented in the spirit of modern architecture, built of reinforced concrete, brick, iron and glass. It is conceived as an extremely modern business and residential building of cubic form, interpolated into a series of adjacent objects. Its spatial organization applied several elements of Corbusier free plan, with a liquid, flexible and functionally interchangeable space with a spacious club room on the ground floor. The glazed circular staircase, in the spirit of the constructivist-functionalist doctrine, drawn into a vertical rectangular concrete frame with rectangular loggias, was a very innovative motif in the Belgrade architecture of the time. The facade of the journalists' house is smooth, without ornaments and zone divisions, based on the axis of symmetry and highlighting the main motif. The flat facade is accentuated by the free poles on the ground floor, horizontal floors and accented by a final withdrawn storey.

== Significance ==
In the scientific and publicizing historiography of Serbian architecture from its erection until today, the house stands out as the most consistent example of early Belgrade functionalistic architecture, and as the cleanest monument of modern architecture from the first half of the fourth decade of the last century, which lead it to be declared a cultural monument. in 1997.

The Journalists' House is one of the most significant buildings in Belgrade conceived in a modern spirit. In addition to its architectural value, it is important as a meeting place for journalists, publicists, writers and prominent personalities from the cultural life of Serbia.

== See also ==
• List of cultural monuments in Belgrade

• Serbian Journalists' Association
