= Spirta House, Belgrade =

Museum in Belgrade, Serbia

Spirta House
- Спиртина кућа
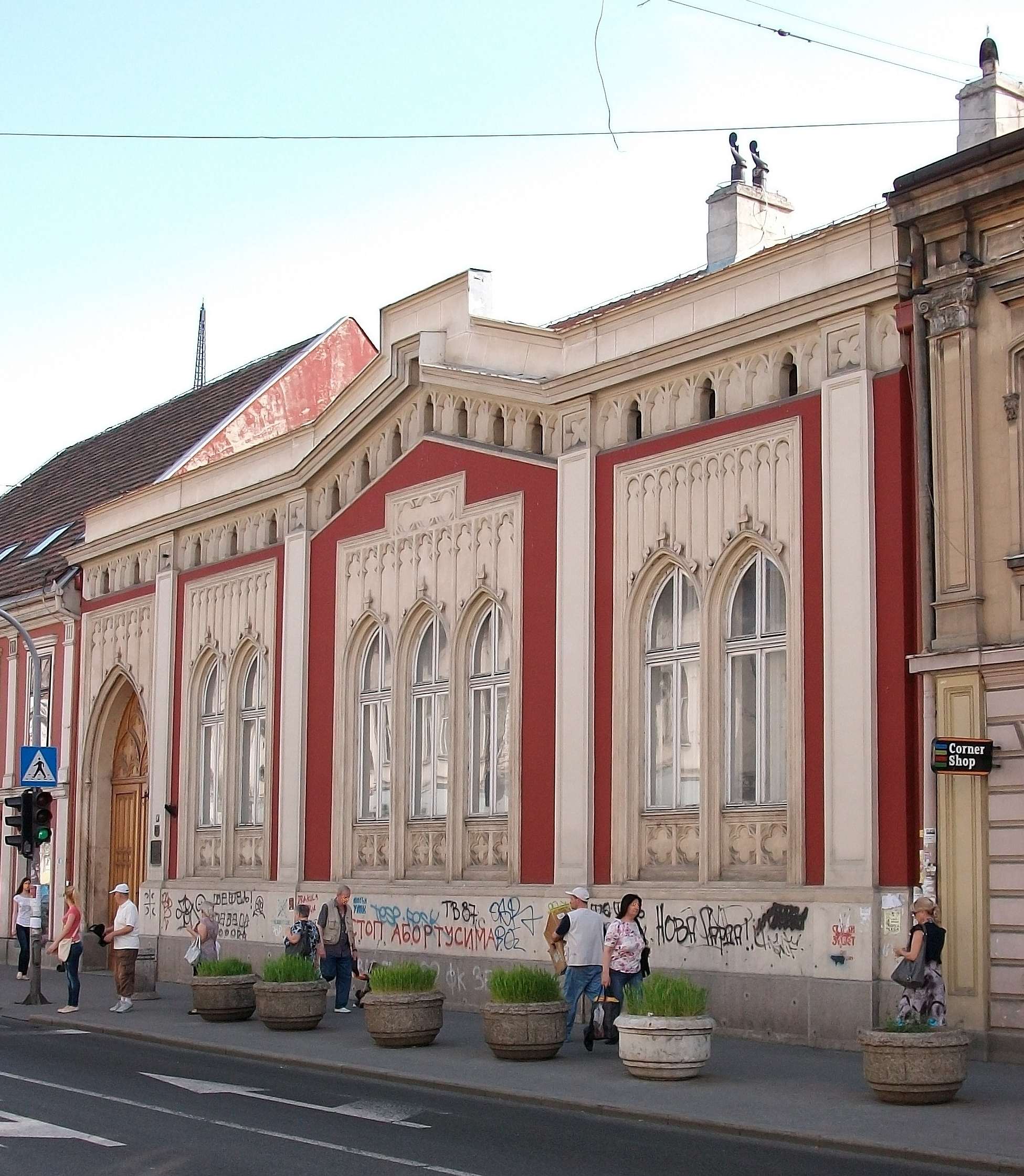
- View from outside

- Location within Belgrade
- Etymology: Spirta family, the original owners

General information
- Status: Protected since 12 March 1965
- Type: One-floor building
- Architectural style: Neogothic
- Location: Zemun, 9 Glavna Street, Belgrade, Serbia
- Coordinates: 44.8431°N 20.4122°E
- Current tenants: Zemun Home Museum, since 1971
- Opened: 1855; 171 years ago
- Renovated: 1968-70; 2002-20

Technical details
- Floor count: 1

Design and construction
- Architect: Heinrich von Ferstel
- Developer: Dimitrije Spirta
- Known for: The only preserved representative of the Gothic Revival architecture in the wider Belgrade area

The Spirta House (Serbian: Спиртина кућа / Spirtina kuća) is a building located in Zemun, Belgrade, the capital of Serbia. Built in 1855, today is the location of the Zemun Home Museum (Serbian: Завичајни музеј Земуна, romanized: Zavičajni muzej Zemuna). Since 1965 has been protected as the cultural monument. The house is the only preserved representative of the Gothic Revival architecture in the wider Belgrade area.

== Spirta family ==
The Spirta family is of Aromanian origin. They lived in the village of Katranisa (today Pyrgoi) in modern Western Macedonia region of Greece and emigrated north of the Sava and Danube rivers, into the Austria, in 1739. Petar Spirta distinguished himself during the Serb Uprising of 1848–49. They settled in Zemun in the late 18th century and, pursuing several successful business enterprises, soon became a well known and a wealthy family. Their importance was confirmed by the charter of the Austrian Emperor Franz Joseph I by which he bestowed the noble title and the coat of arms to Pavle Georgije Spirta in 1856. Dimitrije Spirta, who built the house, lived in it only for a short while, before moving to Pančevo, where he died in 1885, and was buried in the Vojlovica Monastery. The final family member who owned the house was Đorđe Spirta, who bequeathed the house to his wife Sofija, née Georgijević. After he died in 1909, Sofija built a mausoleum to Đorđe on the Gardoš cemetery before she died in 1916 in Switzerland.

Apart from this house, the Spirta family owned a vast properties in southern parts of the Austrian Empire. They included numerous farms and houses in Zemun, Pančevo, Novi Bečej, etc.

== History ==
=== Family house ===
The house was finished in 1855 at number 9 in the Zemun's main street, Glavna and is situated in the neighborhood of Donji Grad. The construction was funded by Dimitrije Spirta and the house was projected by the Austrian architect Heinrich von Ferstel. The house became the "Garni" hotel in the late 19th century. During the World War I it was used by the Austro-Hungarian military. After Zemun became part of Yugoslavia, the house was the location of the "Institute for the blind and deaf" Serbian war invalids (1919-1920). During the Allied bombing of Belgrade in 1944, the house was severely damaged, but was restored after the war. The only remaining item of the once vast wealth of the Spirta family is one glass, made of pink crystal, used by Sofija Spirta.

=== Museum ===
The Zemun Home Museum was founded in 1954, on another location, and administratively annexed to the Belgrade city museum in 1968. The museum shows the history of Zemun from its foundation to 1945. The Spirta House was thoroughly adapted in 1968-70 and on 4 March 1971 the opening ceremony was held which also marked the relocation of the museum into the house. In 2002 the museum was closed due to the impending reconstruction but the works, estimated to last only for 65 days, dragged on. In 2012 it was announced that the house will be reopened in the spring of 2013 but that failed, too, thanks to the lack of funds and apparently low quality reconstruction in the 1960s. The hallmark of the house, the parquet, dried and cracked due to the radiators being placed in the rooms. The specific parquet can only be found in several houses in Europe. The original wallpapers have been conserved and the walls of the corridors repainted. But as of 2017 the museum was still closed "because of the reconstruction and preparation of the new permanent collection".

The museum was temporarily opened for two exhibitions: "A voice of Zemun" in 2014, and "Secession in the Old Core of Zemun" in November 2017. It was announced that the reconstructed museum will be opened in April or May 2022, but the deadline was moved to September 2022.

== Architecture ==
As it was popular in the Romanticism period, the house was designed in the Gothic Revival Architecture (Neogothic). It was one of the first high-floored family houses of the Old Core of Zemun. By its architectural characteristics it stood out from the other houses in Zemun, and the lush interior testified of the social position of the owners, soon to be enhanced by the Spirta family's noble title.

The main part of the house equals in height with other two-storey neighboring houses. It has three tracts, with the side part in the courtyard and an asymmetrically placed carriage entrance. The interior is well furnished, which was characteristic for the rich urban houses. Decorative wallpapers, stylistic ceilings, ceramic stoves, fireplaces and luxurious stylish inlaid parquet stood out. The main facade is composed in the odd number scheme, characteristic for the period of Romanticism. The eclectic style of that epoch and the owners` taste are expressed through the decorative shallow plastic of the façade, the processing of the wood joinery, processing and ornaments of the floors, walls and ceilings of the house. The building was built with solid materials. By its construction line the house documents the old regulation formed in the 18th century. It is the part of the main street in Zemun, its profile and its route.

The façade is made of stone, while the walls of the wide archway at the entrance are painted with depictions from the Greek mythology. Though the hallway paintings are usually referred to as icons, they are actually made in the a secco technique, where pigments of color are applied onto a dry plaster. The stairs that lead to the lobby were made of the glazed red marble. Main characteristics of the interior are the ornamental wallpapers and the unique parquet. Originally made in Belgium, the intarsia style parquet was made from eight different species of wood which were inlayed by hand into the different ornaments. Some of the wood used for the parquet include maple, dark walnut, light walnut, sweet cherry and oak. One of the suggestions was that new parquet should be made, while the old one will be exhibited in some museum and the other ideas included sending it abroad for renovation or inviting the foreign experts to fix it here.

Austrian conservationist atelier was contacted to do the works, but this collaboration was abandoned due to the legal problems. In the end, it was decided to start the proper restoration, which began in June 2018, by the restorers from the Museum of the Applied Arts and the National Museum in Belgrade. The process is highly painstaking: each plaque from the intarsia layer has to be removed from the wooded padding to which it was glued with the animal glue, using the water vapor or water heated to over 90 °C (194 °F). Each piece is then being glued to the parquet flooring paper. The new concrete coat will be made in all 5 rooms which are floored with the parquet and the radiators will be removed. The project should be finished by 2020.

In March 2020 it was announced that the parquet is being renovated and should be placed in June, while the entire works on the interior of the house should be finished by the end of 2020. The parquet will be coated with some protective matter. Renovation of the parquet was finished in October 2020. About one third of the old parquet was replaced, and the remaining parts are now placed in the center of the salon, with uniformed bordure around it. While repairing the windows' frames, it was discovered that they were originally gold plated.

It was decided to adapt the inner yard into the lapidarium. The behaton (plasticized concrete) slabs which formed the pathways in the yard were removed, and replaced witch bricks, which were the original material used for plating the paths when the house was built. Due to the groundwater which constantly moisturizes the façade, entry into the museum (einfahrt) is also repaired, so as the walls covered with a secco paintings.

== Protection ==
Marking the 110th anniversary of the house, it was declared a cultural monument on 12 March 1965 (Decision no. 182/4). It is part of the protected Spatial Cultural-Historical Unit of Great Importance of the Old Core of Zemun which was protected in 1979.

== See more ==
- List of the culture monuments in Belgrade (in Serbian)

== See also ==
- List of museums in Serbia
