= Vasiona =

Serbian astronomy magazine

- Magazine cover
- Editor-In-Chief: Vladan Čelebonović
- Categories: Astronomy
- Frequency: four times per year
- First issue: 1953
- Company: Astronomical Society Ruđer Bošković
- Country: Serbia
- Based in: Belgrade
- Language: Serbian
- Website: adrb.org/vasiona
- ISSN: 0506-4295

Vasiona (Serbian: Васиона - Universe) is a magazine for popularization of astronomy published by the Astronomical Society Ruđer Bošković. It is being published four times per year. Every number contains news about astronomy and news about events in the society. It is published for more than half a century and is the oldest magazine for popularization of natural sciences in Serbia. It is the only public source of astronomical ephemerides in Serbia.

Magazine articles can roughly be divided into works, news and others. The articles are mostly written for the high school level, although there are those for the higher level, meant for the smaller circle of readers.

== History ==
The first two issues of the magazine have been printed in the second half of 1953. The magazine was started by the Astronomical Society Ruđer Bošković and Astronautical Society of the Aeronautical union of Yugoslavia, as a magazine for astronomy and astronautics. For the Astronomical Society, Vasiona was the continuation of work on the magazine Saturn, which was published before World War II. Nenad Đ. Janković, the last editor of Saturn, was also the first editor of Vasiona.

Cooperation with the "astronauticists" was very successful until 1962 when they have stopped financing the magazine, and so Vasiona had to reduce its format. In the 1970s the number of astronautical articles reduced so much that since 1980 Vasiona is purely astronomical magazine.

Publication was stopped from 2012-2018 as a result of funding difficulties.

== Editors ==
Editors-in-chief of Vasiona were:

1. Nenad Đ. Janković, 1953-1972,
2. Pero M. Đurković, 1973 & 1974,
3. prof. dr Jelena Milogradov-Turin, 1975-1982,
4. prof. dr Branislav Ševarlić, 1983 & 1984,
5. dr Milan S. Dimitrijević, 1985-2005,
6. Aleksandar Tomić, 2005 & 2006,
7. dr Vladan Čelebonović, since 2007
