= Mehmed Paša Sokolović Fountain =

Ottoman era fountain in Belgrade

- Чесма Мехмед-паше Соколовића (Serbian)
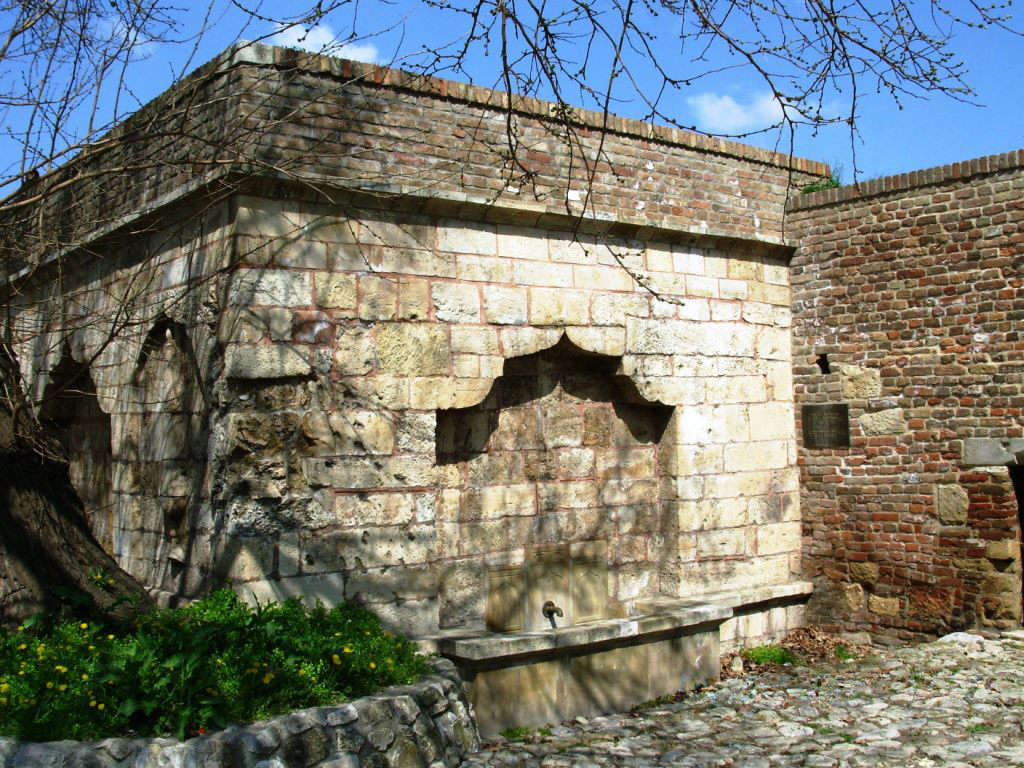
- Меhmed Paša Sokolović's Fountain located near the northwest wall of the Upper Town, in the ditch in front of the inner fort.
- Interactive map of Mehmed Paša Sokolović Fountain
- 44.824069°N 20.449203°E
- Location: Belgrade; Serbia

History
- Built: 1576/77
- Built for: Меhmed Paša Sokolović

Site notes
- Architectural style: Ottoman
- Governing body: City of Belgrade's Institute for the protection of the cultural monuments

Mehmed Paša Sokolović Fountain (Serbian: Чесма Мехмед-паше Соколовића, romanized: Česma Mehmed-paše Sokolovića) is an Ottoman era fountain in Belgrade. It is located next to the Defterdar's Gate near the northwestern wall of the Upper Town of Belgrade Fortress. Evliya Çelebi states that the fountain was erected in 1576/77, during the lifetime of Grand Vizier Меhmed Paša Sokolović and it is his only surviving endowment in Belgrade. The precise position of the fountain does not appear in any cartographic sources until the 17th century. The earliest sketch dates back to a plan from the National Library in Paris from the early 17th century, in which the fountain was presented as a rectangular structure with three free sides.

== Location ==
The drinking fountain is located at the remains of the inner rampart, next to the cobblestone path which leads through the Defterdar's Gate into the Lower Town. It is situated opposite of the Clock Gate and its one side is bricked in the rampart behind it.

== History ==
=== Origin ===
Out of the once numerous Belgrade fountains, only this one remains standing to this day. The only mention of this fountain from the 16th to the 18th century, was by Evliya Çelebi, who in 1667 mentions it located in a trench around the Narin kale (central fort). Çelebi described two inscriptions on the fountain: This drinking fountain was renovated by the benefactor Sokollu Mehmed Pasha 1576-1577, and Come, my God, if on this world you wish to drink from paradise spring, with note that the latter was inscribed in 1597–1598.

This raised a question whether the pasha only renovated some old fountain in 1576, or it was finished at his behest 20 years after his death. It is believed today that he built a new fountain in 1576-1577, as there are two other endowment fountains by Mehmed Pasha in Istanbul, both of which are very similar to the Belgrade's one. Next to the fountain there was a Suleiman the Magnificent's Mosque, dedicated to the Ottoman sultan. Its exact location is unknown today, and it is not known if they were specifically searched for during the various archaeological surveys in the fortress. One of the reasons is funding, as Marko Popović, head of the Archaeological Institute and a longtime surveyor of the fortress said, archaeology is a science which is a privilege of the rich nations.

=== Later history ===
The only western source that mentions this fountain is Gerhard Cornelius Van Den Driesch who visited Belgrade in 1719. He mentions a drinking fountain in the Upper Town being supplied by water from an hour's walk away. This spring, known as the Colorful Spring, was at the time located in the Mali Mokri Lug village area, and today in the Zeleno Brdo neighborhood of Zvezdara. It was one of the three surviving Roman aqueducts which conducted water into the fortress. The Ottomans in time roofed the aqueduct, and it was used as a tunnel by the Dahije to infiltrate the fortress in 1801, and overthrow and kill Belgrade's vizier Hadji Mustafa Pasha. The Dahije then demolished the aqueduct, in fear that someone might use it against them, the way they did, thus cutting the water supply to the fountain for the next 200 years.

Next to the fountain there was a Suleiman the Magnificent's Mosque, dedicated to the Ottoman sultan. Its exact location is unknown today, and it is not known if they were specifically searched for during the various archaeological surveys in the fortress. One of the reasons is funding, as Marko Popović, head of the Archaeological Institute and a longtime surveyor of the fortress said, archaeology is a science which is a privilege of the rich nations.

The fountain was buried until 1938 when the first conservation work was done on the object. Additional works were done in 1960. During the archaeological excavations in 1979 the façade with the completely preserved decorative stone slabs was discovered, so as the stone trough. Third side was reburied until the fountain was thoroughly examined in October 2015. The fountain was reconnected to the Belgrade's waterworks system in 2006.

=== 2017 reconstruction ===
A thorough renovation began in May 2017 and was to finish by October, but the deadline is later moved to 2018. A 20 m (66 ft) long and 2 m (6 ft 7 in) tall wall of the corten steel was added, for both the esthetic and static purposes. The benches were also nstalled. When the first pictures appeared, showing the steel fence and added downhill pathway ramp made of planks, the public reaction was loud and negative, perceiving the new additions as out of place and in collision with the architecture of the fortress.

From the Institute for the protection of the cultural monuments it was replied that the new elements represent modern ideas, that each generation should leave its mark and that "taste is subjective, while the quality is measurable". They also added that the new objects clearly show that they are not part of the fortification, so "the visitors won't be deluded". Unlike the modernist interventions around it, the fountain itself was restored using stones with the characteristics as closer to the original as possible.

During the digging, several archaeological discoveries were made. Remnants of the Roman castrum (from the 3rd century AD), two urns from the Bronze Age and remains of the Neolithic object were discovered. All the findings were conserved and buried again.

== Architecture ==
Sharing the history of the fortress and following in its transformations, the fountain's shape is changed in time. With numerous repairs and remodels, it remains unknown what the fountain's original appearance was. It is generally shaped as an uneven cube. The fountain has a rectangular basis 7.5 m (25 ft) in length and 6.3 m (21 ft) in width. In the inside there is a vaulted reservoir of an ellipsoid base which connected to the old Ottoman era water supply. The existing vaulted channel, leaning against the fourth, north-eastern side of the fountain connects to the Austrian era water supply constructed at some time between 1719 and 1739. The entrance to the reservoir through a vault next to the fountain was probably also constructed at that time.

The exterior consists of properly processed limestone blocks. In the authentic form, all three free standing façades of the fountain were decorated, and water pipes were placed on them. In the lower part there was a plinth 0.7 m (2 ft 4 in) high, whereas in the upper zone, at 3.9 m (13 ft) height there was a semi-circular cornice. The former appearance of the façade above this cornice is unknown. The preserved, lateral south-east façade of the fountain was decorated with a niche, around 0.35 m (1 ft 2 in) deep, ending in a Saracen arch. The front south-west façade, being the main façade, was the most representative in decoration. It was decorated with three niches. The central niche was identical to the one on the south-east lateral façade and had a stone basin, but only the rear part in line with the niche was preserved. The central niche was flanked by two smaller, lateral, semi-circular niches, set up above the plinth and each one decorated with a stylized cypress.

Меhmed Paša Sokolović's fountain has cultural, historical and architectural value as a representative and at the same time one of the rarely preserved monuments of Ottoman architecture in Belgrade.

== See also ==
- Sokollu Mehmed Pasha
- Gates of Belgrade
