= European Historic Houses Association =

European Historic Houses Association is an international organization based in Brussels, Belgium, and registered in the Netherlands. Through consultancy with the European Commission and the European Council, it has oversight over twenty-four national historic houses associations. Its scope includes conservation of historic houses and cultural heritage, including cultural goods.

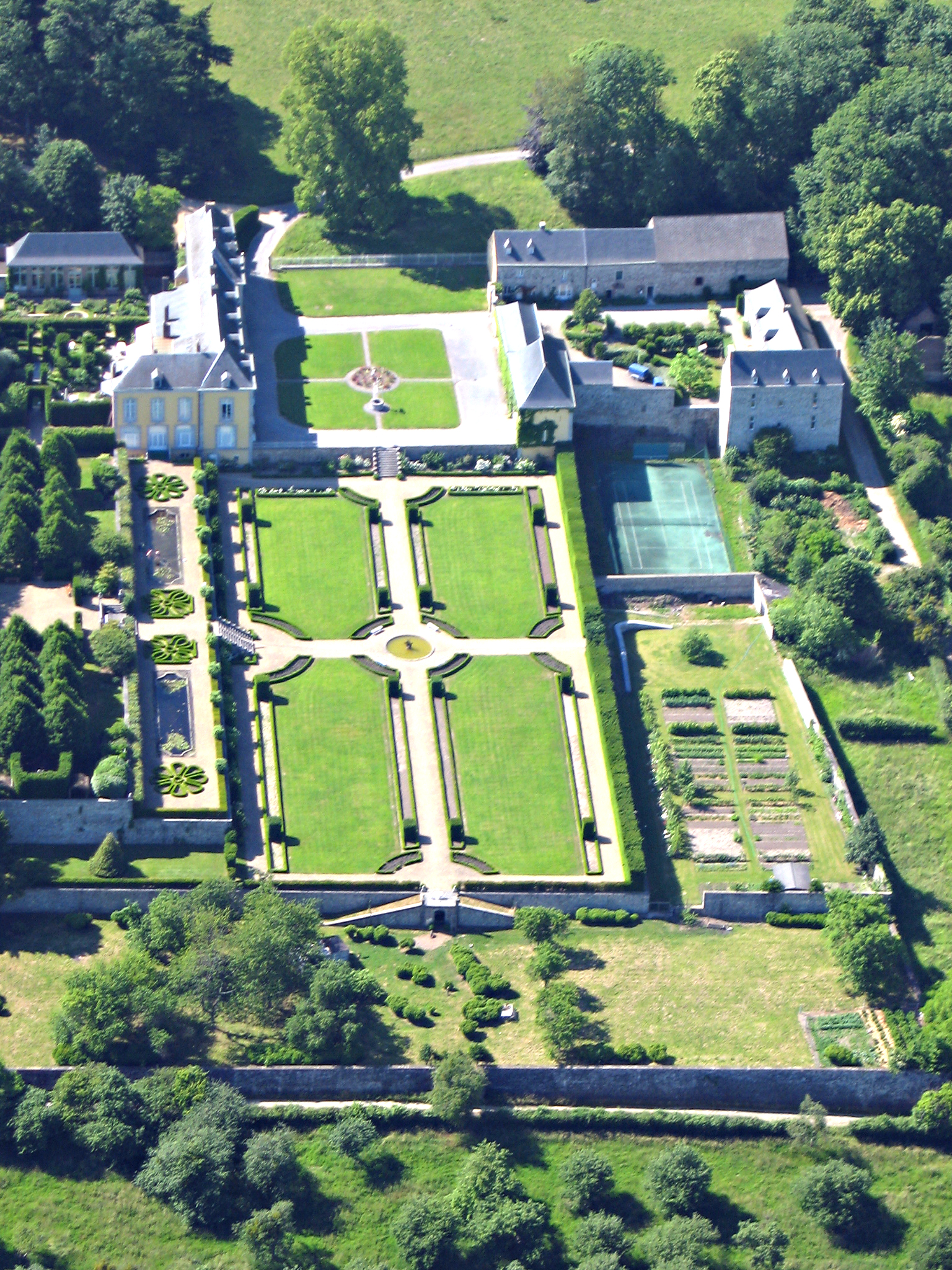
Château de Flawinne in Flawinne

Other affiliated organizations through the Council of Europe include Europa Nostra, European Confederation of Conservator-Restorers' Organisations (ECCO), and European Network for Conservation-Restoration Education (ENCoRE). While previous presidents of the association include Antoine, 13th Prince of Ligne and Jean, Grand Duke of Luxembourg, in 2017, the Executive President was Count Rodolphe de Looz-Corswarem.
