= Aleksandar Palas Hotel =

Hotels in Belgrade, Serbia

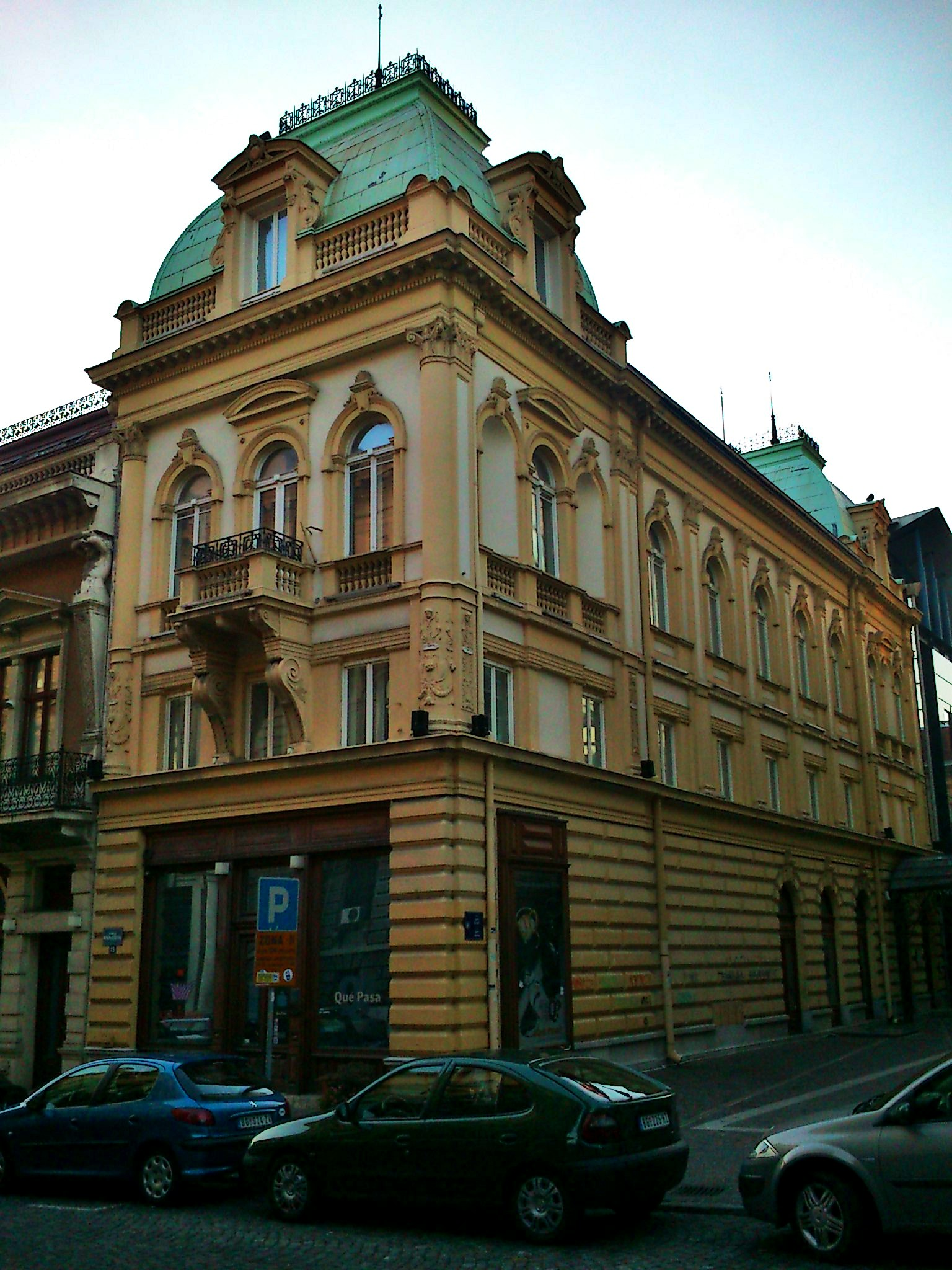
- Crvenčanin House in September 2012.

General information
- Location: Stari Grad, Belgrade, Serbia, Kralja Petra Street 13-15; Belgrade 11000
- Coordinates: 44°49′8″N 20°27′12.5″E
- Opening: 1887; 139 years ago

Technical details
- Floor count: 4

Design and construction
- Architects: Jovan Ilkić (original building, 1887)

Other information
- Number of rooms: 9
- Number of suites: 9

Website
- www.hotel-aleksandar-beograd.rs

Aleksandar Palas Hotel (Serbian: Хотел Александар Палас/Hotel Aleksandar Palas) is a hotel located in Belgrade, the capital of Serbia.

== Location ==
The Aleksandar Palas hotel is located in the very heart of Belgrade, at the corner of the Kralja Petra I and Cara Lazara streets. Situated near the hotel is the Kalemegdan Fortress. The main pedestrian street, Knez Mihailova, is about 80 meters from the hotel as well as the "Saborna" church and the Building of the Patriarchate. Many banks, such as the National bank of Serbia are right across the hotel. The access to the freeway is quick, thus communication with the Belgrade Nikola Tesla airport is very simple. Nearby, approximately 1000 meters, are both the Central bus and train stations.

== History ==
The building that houses Aleksandar Palas Hotel is known as the Crvenčanin House, after its original owner—а prominent Belgrade merchant. It was built in 1887 according to the architect Jovan Ilkić's design in the academistic architectural style. Located in a part of Belgrade whose central area has been declared a pedestrian zone, the building has been included on the list of cultural monuments in the city of Belgrade.

Aleksandar Palas Hotel opened its doors in April 2004 with a luxury boutique concept. Named after King Aleksandar Obrenović and located between Kralja Petra I Street (Karađorđević dynasty), and Cara Lazara Street (technically a Lazarević though a direct successor of the Nemanjić dynasty), the five star hotel gave a historical nod to the third Serbian royal house — the Obrenovićs.

One of the individuals behind the venture was Radosav Komadinić, Užice-born former professional basketball player and KK Budućnost head coach, who since 2000 owned restaurant Que Pasa located in the same building where the hotel now opened; Que Pasa thus became part of the hotel's offering. Aleksandar Palas Hotel has been declared to be a five star hotel by the Serbian Ministry of Tourism, Commerce and Services. Soon afterwards, Kraljevina restaurant opened in the hotel building's basement, expanding its offerings.

Months after its grand opening, in January 2005, Aleksandar Palas became part of the Great Hotels of the World alliance. It has since gone off that list.

Komadinić pulled out of the venture in September 2007.

In October 2010, Komadinić, one of the hotel founders, got beaten up in front of his Novi Beograd home by an unknown group of men. In November 2010 the hotel went into bankruptcy and closed. Throughout 2011 and 2012, Živko Vujisić, another one of the hotel's owners, got into trouble with the law.

Hotel Aleksandar Palas reopened during spring 2013 with a garni (bed and breakfast) concept and a four star rating. In September 2013, the hotel's Que Pasa restaurant reopened as well.
