= Despot Stefan Tower =

Structure in Belgrade, Serbia

- Kalemegdan, Belgrade; Serbia
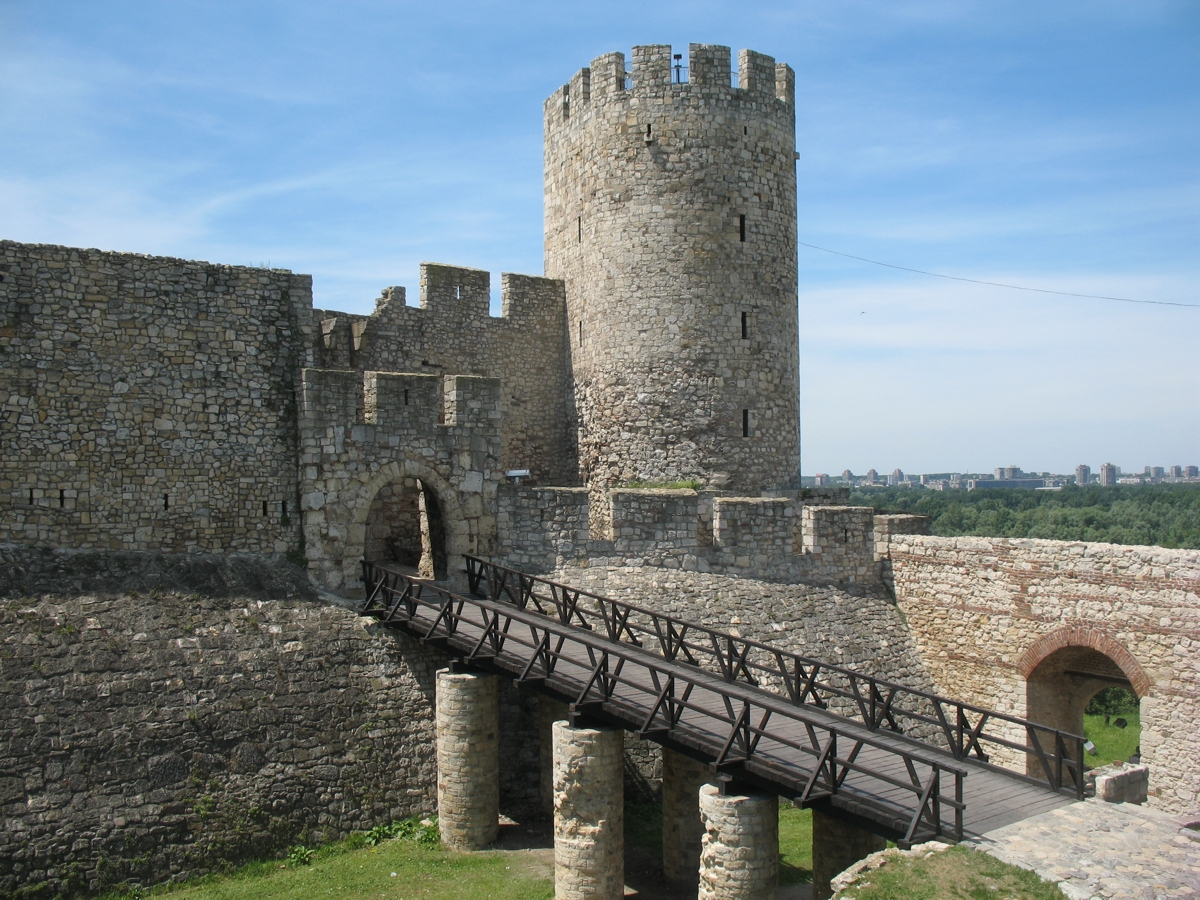
- Despot Stefan Tower in Upper City of Kalemegdan Fortress

Site information
- Open to the public: Yes

Location
- Location within Belgrade
- Coordinates: 44°49′31″N 20°27′4″E

Site history
- Built: 1405
- Built by: Stefan Lazarević
- In use: Serbian Despotate
- Materials: Stone

The Despot Stefan Tower (Serbian: Деспотова кула; Despotova kula) or Dizdar Tower (Диздарева кула; Dizdareva kula) is a structure in Belgrade, Serbia, built c. 1405, a couple of years after the city became the capital of Serbian Despotate under Despot Stefan Lazarević.

In May 1963, representatives of the city administration, Institute for the protection of the cultural monuments and members of the astronomical societies, agreed to adapt the Dizdar Tower into an observatory. Works began in May, instruments were to be installed by autumn, and the observatory was to become operational in October 1963.

Today, the tower is the seat of the Astronomical Society Ruđer Bošković and houses its Popular Observatory. The Observatory has two instruments: refractor Zeiss (110/2200mm) and reflector Tall 200 K (200/2200mm), both of which are used mainly for observations at night. Four panoramic telescopes are also mounted on the tower, which can be used to observe the panorama of Belgrade.

== See also ==
- Architecture in Serbia
- Kalemegdan
