= Belgrade Planetarium =

Planetarium

- Београдски планетаријум
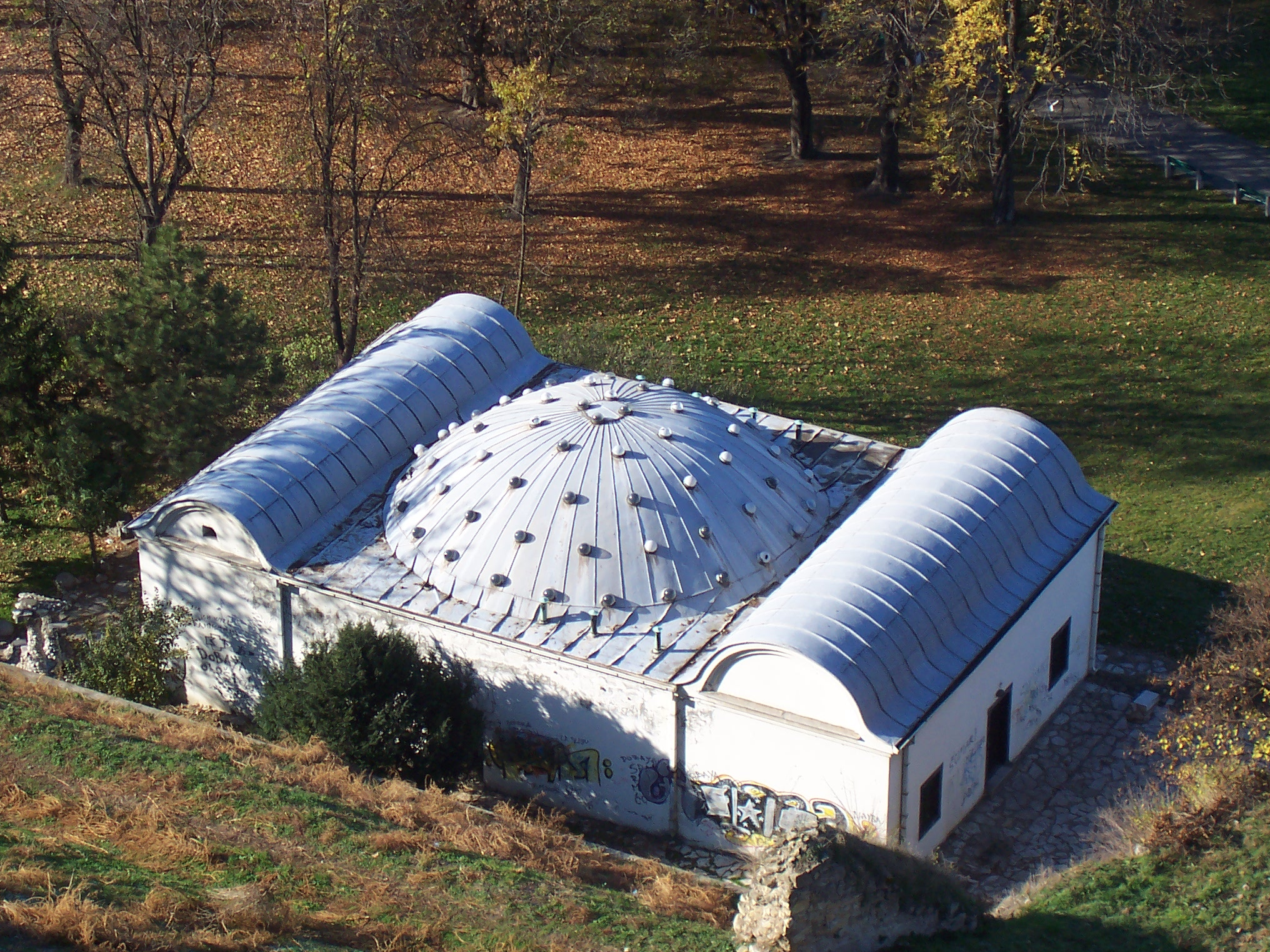
- Aerial view on Belgrade Planetarium

- Location within Belgrade

General information
- Location: Belgrade, Serbia
- Coordinates: 44°49′30.9″N 20°26′58.8″E
- Construction started: 1860
- Completed: 1867
- Opened: 1867; 159 years ago
- Client: Astronomical Society Ruđer Bošković
- Owner: Government of Serbia

Belgrade Planetarium (Serbian: Београдски планетаријум, Beogradski planetarijum) is one of two planetariums in Serbia. It is located in Belgrade and is operated by the Astronomical Society Ruđer Bošković. Before 1967 it was known as the "Turkish bath in Lower Town".

== Location ==
The planetarium is located in the Lower Town of the Belgrade Fortress. It is situated on the plateau below the Danube slope of the hill, in the immediate vicinity of the remains of the medieval Lower town's Eastern Gate complex.

== History ==
The edifice was originally built as the Turkish bath (hamam). It was constructed between 1860 and 1867, when Ottomans left the fortress, though the exact date is unknown. During the World War I it was used as the military bath. The building was almost demolished as the result of the 1944 explosion in the nearby Eastern Gate of the fortress.

After the city Institute for the protection of the cultural monuments was founded, the Institute initiated the reconstruction of the hamam in 1962, citing the building's "undisputed monumental properties". The reconstruction was finished in 1964 and the venue remained unused until 1967. The original idea was for the facility to be adapted into the lapidarium. It was to become an exhibition space for the stone objects – monuments, epitaphs, sarcophagi, statues, etc. The plan was scrapped at one point and it was decided to turn it into the planetarium.

In order for the building to function as the planetarium, in the halovat, a central section of the hamam, an independent circular structure was constructed. It hosts the projector and the vault of the dome is used as the screen. The planetarium of the Astronomical Society Ruđer Bošković was installed in 1967–1968.

The planetarium's instrument, little Zeiss's planetarium ZKP-2 (Zeiss Kleines Planetarium-2), was purchased at the Belgrade Fair of technology in 1966 thanks to Josip Broz Tito, after an initiative of the members of the Society. Unofficially, it started working in 1969, and officially in the 1970.

The planetarium's hall has a diameter of 8 m (26 ft) and 80 seats. The 1960s drawings of the panorama of Belgrade are preserved. During the festivities which marked the 50 years of the planetarium in 2019, the facility was renewed with the new projector which would allow the video wall projections. Also the planetarium was partially renovated as the lead roof panels deteriorated in time.

Though one of the most modern planetariums in the Southeast Europe at the time, by 2019 it became and "oldtimer" among such facilities. Though open for visitors and regularly used for lectures, the planetarium was not maintained properly, and by 2022 visibly deteriorated.

== Characteristics ==
At the entrance into the planetarium is the sculpture titled "The man at the end of the second millennium". It is work of sculptor Zoran Kuzmanović. In 2019, it was estimated that over half a million visitors came to the planetarium in the 50 years since it was open. The venue occasionally hosts artistic and cultural gathering, unrelated to the astronomy.

The main visitors to the planetarium are students of Belgrade primary and high schools. Following periodic activities of the Society are taking place in the Planetarium:

- Astronomy courses for beginners (spring and autumn; in spring of 2007, the eightieth course was held)
- Belgrade Astronomical weekend
- Summer astronomy meetings
