= Lešće =

Area of Belgrade, Serbia

Coordinates: 44°48′29″N 20°32′37″E

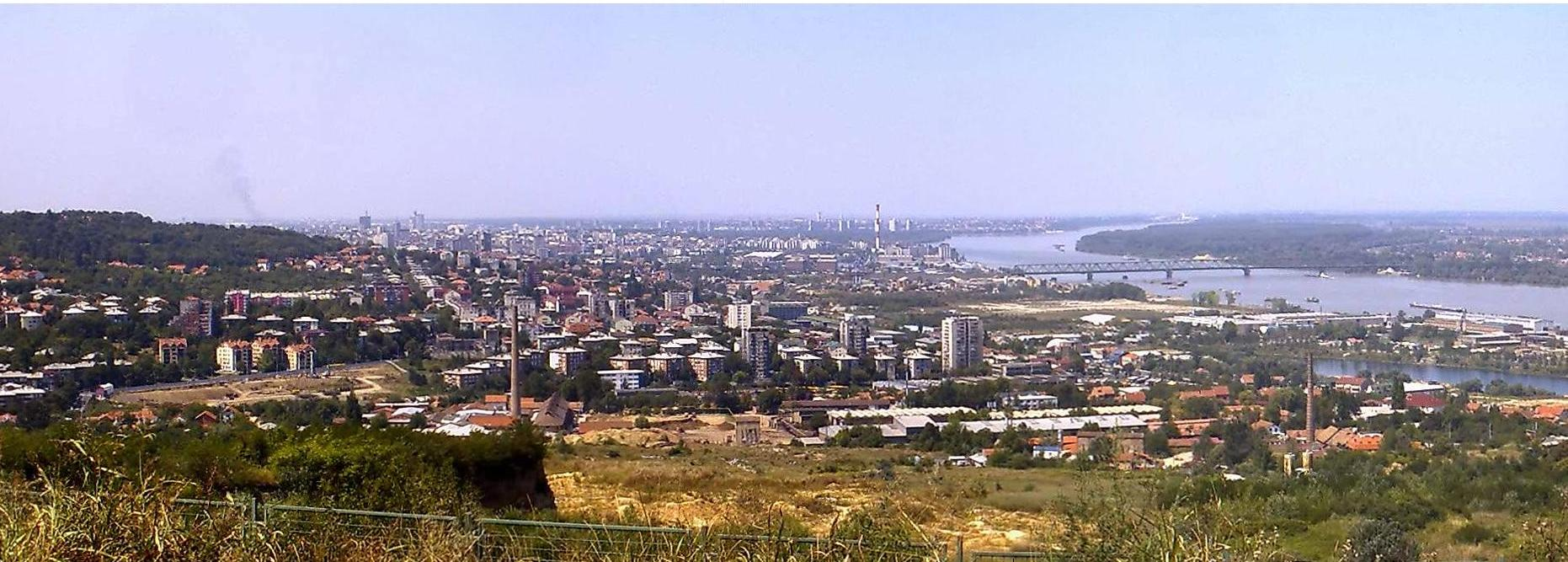
Panoramic view on the neighborhoods of Karaburma and Rospi Ćuprija, and further into Belgrade, from the Lešće cemetery

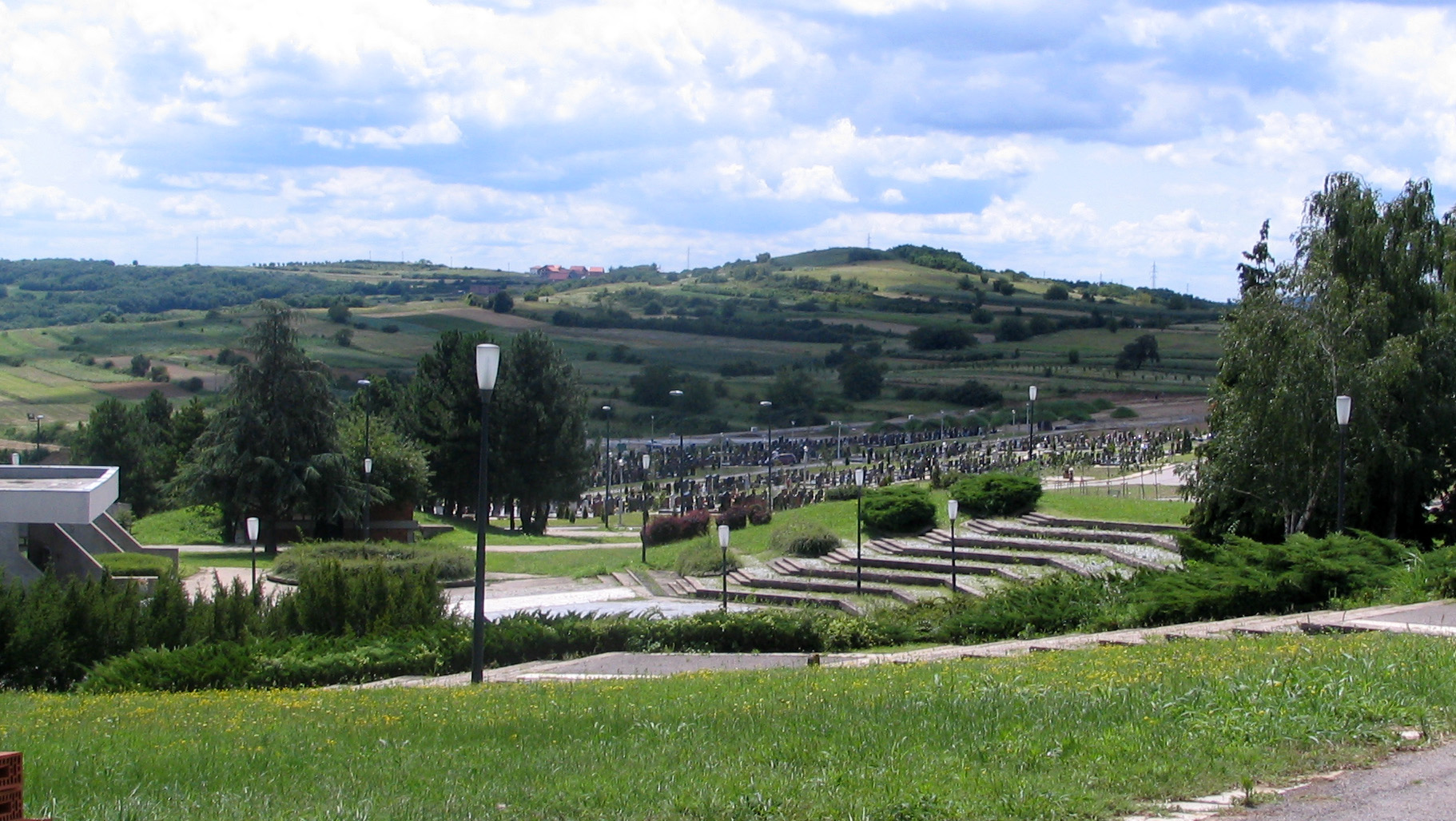
The Lešće cemetery

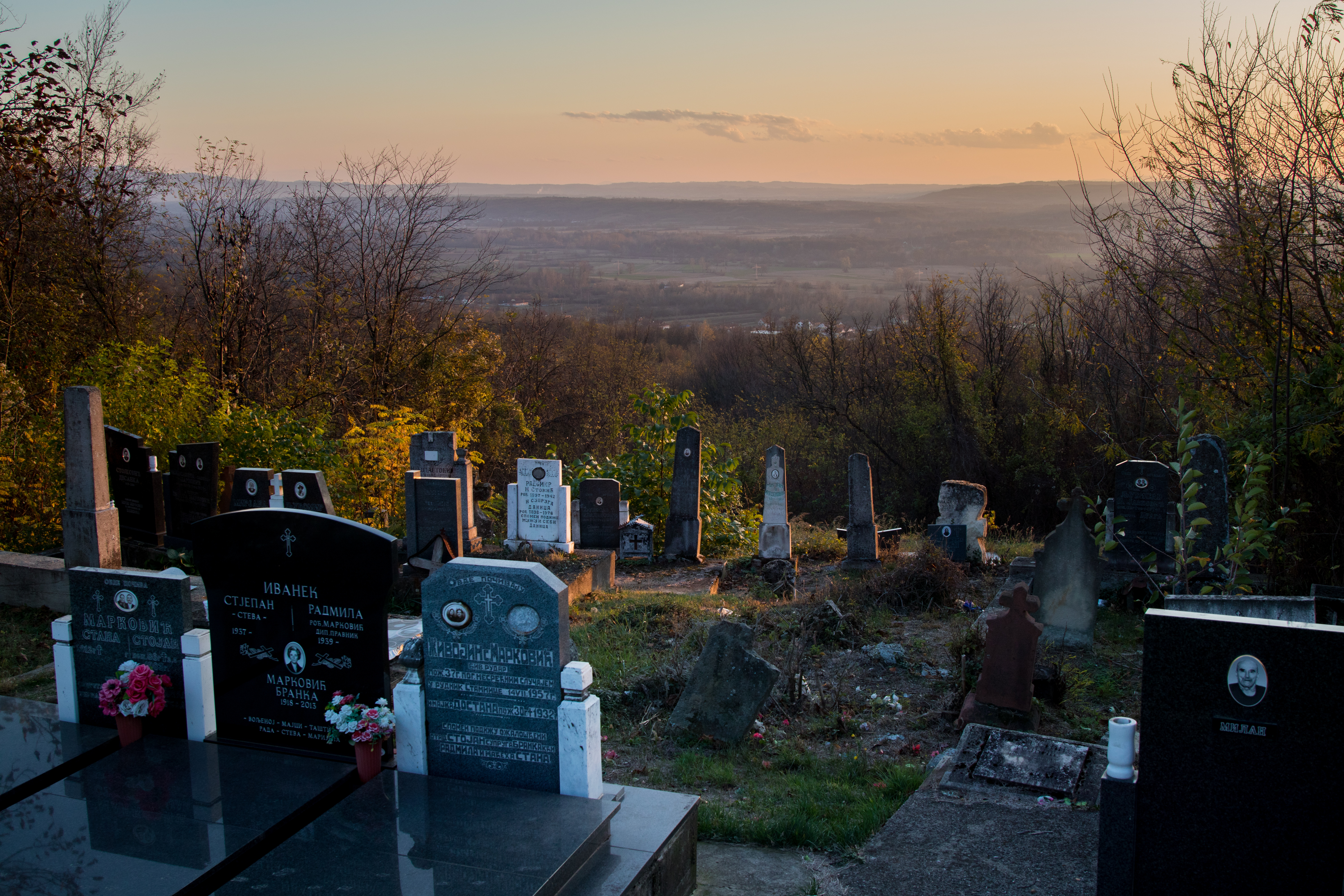
The Lešće cemetery in 2019

Lešće (Serbian Cyrillic: Лешће) is an urban neighborhood of Belgrade, the capital of Serbia and one of the city's largest cemeteries.

== Location ==
Lešće is located in Belgrade's municipality of Palilula, with the small, southeastern part belonging to the municipality of Zvezdara. It is situated in the eastern part of the Višnjica Field, along the Slanci Road (Slanački put) as the southern extension of the neighborhood of Višnjička Banja. To the east, Lešće stretches to the Belgrade's suburban settlement of Slanci and further to Veliko Selo. A 274 m (899 ft) tall Orlovača Hill separates it from the neighborhoods of Ćalije and Rospi Ćuprija on the east, and Mirijevo on the south.

== Characteristics ==
Lešće is a small, residential area developed around the Lešće cemetery.

== Cemetery ==
The cemetery was established in 1980. Chief architect was Milica Jakšić and the detailed urban plan for the area was done in the Belgrade Urban Institute. There is a Church of Saint John the Merciful within the cemetery complex

Architect Olga Litričin designed the crematory. Construction began in 1978 and the facility became operational in 1981. The entire crematory complex covers 4.4 ha (11 acres). Though not the oldest crematory in Serbia (Belgrade New Cemetery had one since 1963-1964), for a while it was the only operational one in Serbia, until 2005 when another one was open in Novi Sad.

== In popular culture ==
Folk singer Aca Lukas recorded a song Lešće, which was the title song of his 8th studio album Lešće, issued in 2008.
