= Ada Huja =

Ada Huja Ада Хуја
- Urban neighborhood
- Location within Belgrade
- Coordinates: 44°49′23″N 20°30′39″E
- Country: Serbia
- Region: Belgrade
- Municipality: Palilula
- Time zone: UTC+1 (CET)
  - Summer (DST): UTC+2 (CEST)
- Area code: +381(0)11
- Car plates: BG

Ada Huja (Serbian Cyrillic: Ада Хуја) is an urban neighborhood of Belgrade, the capital of Serbia. It is located in Belgrade's municipality of Palilula.

== Location ==
Ada Huja is a peninsula on the right bank of the Danube. It is bordered by the neighborhoods of Viline Vode and Deponija to the east and Bogoslovija and Karaburma to the south. It engulfs a bay of Dunavac (Cyrillic: Дунавац; Serbian for Danube armlet) on the Danube, which separates its eastern half from the neighborhoods of Višnjica and Rospi Ćuprija to the south. The area is generally bordered by two traffic facilities: the Višnjička street to the south and the Pančevo bridge to the east.

== History ==
Ada Huja was previously an island, as its name suggests (ada huja, Turkish/Serbian for rustle island). The island and the entire Danube's bank across it (Viline Vode, Karaburma, Višnjička Banja) is rich in springs of the sulfur water. Across the island, in the modern neighborhood of Rospi Ćuprija, remains of the major Celtic necropolis are found. The remains belonging to the Scordisci, a Celtic tribe which founded Singidunum, the predecessor of Belgrade, were found on the island. In 2018, it was announced that a recreated Celtic village would be built on Ada Huja as a tourist attraction.

Ancient Romans cultivated grapevines and used thermal springs for public bathhouses. At the beginning of the 20th century, the island was covered with lush vegetation and vineyards, helped by the favorable micro-climate (winds) and thermal springs. It was a green oasis with wild beaches on the shores. The area was covered in oak and ash forests, while the surrounding waters were abundant in carp. In 1960 it was designated as the official city landfill and remained so until 1977 when the new landfill was opened in the village of Vinča. The filling up of the Danube's bed between the bank of Belgrade and the island began, with garbage and dirt, effectively turning Ada Huja into a peninsula in the 1960s. The filled area covers the western part of Ada Huja while the former island now forms the eastern half, with a separate island-like extension on its eastern tip. Today, from the Pančevački most to the easternmost tip, Ada Huja is almost 4 kilometres (2.5 miles) long and the entire area (filled and former island) covers 5 square kilometres (1.9 square miles).

At the bottom of the Danube next to Ada Huja is the ruin of a plane of the Royal Yugoslav Army Air Force. It was shot down in April 1941, during the Axis attack on Yugoslavia in 1941.

In the late 1990s, a Czech environmentalist company conducted a survey of the water and found all sorts of toxins in it.

A famous restaurant, "Carska Ohota", was located on the Danube's bank in Ada Huja. After a 2014 car crash when three young adults were killed when their car fell into the river, the ramp was placed on the access road to the quay. Built from wood, the restaurant burned to the ground in August 2018.

In December 2021, city announced restoration of the riverine public transportation, which was discontinued decades ago. One of the first two proposed lines should be Borča-Ada Huja. In the same month, construction of the pier at Ada Huja began. Apart from the public transportation, it was said it will also be used for nautical tourism. However, new mayor Aleksandar Šapić stated in July 2022 that the riverine public transportation project will not be pursued further, calling it too expensive and "pointless".

== Economy ==
Ada Huja is entirely an industrial area. However, two Romani people slums (informal settlements, or locally classified as unhygienic settlements) developed on its eastern (Ada Huja) and western tip (Deponija).

The western section generally spawns around the Vuka Vrčevića street. It is filled with many hangars and companies for building and construction, including a series of concrete plants and gravel and aggregates storing and treating facilities.

The central section is still mostly unused. Except for several hangars, the area is grassy, forested and marshy. During high levels of the Danube waters, entire bank of Ada Huja is flooded and companies very often don't work until the water recedes.

As of 2021, Ada Huja is still the only official location in Belgrade where the waste and fecal water is being dumped into the Danube, by both the city owned communal company, and privately owned companies. Still, it was estimated that at least on some 30 other locations, the waste was dumped directly into both the Danube and Sava all over the city.

Eastern section, on the western tip of the Rukavac is generally referred to as Ada Huja by most people, as the former island begins here. Some of the largest industrial facilities of Ada Huja are located here: paper and cardboard factory Avala-Ada, furniture factory Novi Dom, several gravel storages, etc. Paper factory, popularly called Kartonka, was founded in 1921 and is the oldest paper factory in Serbia. It was closed in the 1990s and reopened in 2008. In 2017-18 Kartonka came into the spotlight because of a series of fires: 19 July (two fatalities) and 10 August 2017, and a series of four fires in two months in 2018 after which the factory was temporarily shut down. As of 2018 it works only with the recycled paper.

The shore is arranged in this part, turned into a quay and the promenade. There are several restaurants, children playgrounds, volleyball and tennis courts. Balkan's largest kart racing track is also located here. A small dock was constructed on the quay. The forested area of the former island stretches from here to the east and covers 13.9 ha (34 acres).

== Future ==
Plans for the future of Ada Huja vary. A company Eko Zona Ada Huja was founded to transform it into the future recreational zone, with marina, large shopping malls, facilities for water sports and sport terrains, though not much has been done. The company still receives large quantities of garbage, earth and rubble which is used to stabilize the marsh in the central part and for continuing filling up of the Rukavac. In the current fashion of giving foreign names (especially a series of 'cities') to the newly built areas of Belgrade, this one, projected for 2008–2010, is supposed to be called Dunav City (Dunav is Serbian for the Danube). The Faculty of Architectury however proposed the name Vilingrad ("fairy town"). The project was scrapped later.

However, this may be in collision with the General Urbanistic Plan (GUP) of Belgrade, as the city government plans to construct another bridge over the Danube from Ada Huja which would intensify the traffic. Also a railway is supposed to be conducted through the area and over the new bridge, with the Belgrade's future main loco-freight railway station to be located in Ada Huja.

Still, despite constant announcements from the city government that Ada Huja will be turned into another Ada Ciganlija, a green area and a recreational hub for this part of Belgrade, that the bridge will be built, etc., except for some works on the quay along the Danube, as of 2019 nothing has been done. Apart from the lack of fundings and general indifference of the city bureaucracy, there are other problems. Port of Belgrade, which was acquired by the Serbian tycoon Milan Beko, claims ownership of the entire city's right bank of the Danube, including the entire Ada Huja. City has been suing the Port for years, where one court would decide that city is the owner, and then the higher court would say differently and so on. Another major problem is state of the soil in Ada Huja. Consisting of decades old layers of garbage, pressed down and occasionally mixed with dirt, the soil is full of methane and before any construction on it, it has to be remediated, as placing a house on such a ground would be like placing it atop the bomb.

In 2011–2012, some green movements and experts from the Faculty of Forestry investigated the area. On some areas of the landfill, there were bursts of methane and other gasses, right below the surface. They measured 30 grams of petroleum hydrocarbon and substantial presence of the heavy metals per 1 kilogram of the soil. It was estimated that there are 300.000 cubic metres (10,594.4 cubic feet) of contaminated sludge in the Rukavac (which is one third of the total water volume in it) and water is so polluted that it is beyond any category. Already in 2008 it was estimated that the Rukavac can't be saved anyway and that its eastern section, up to the mouth of the Mirijevski Potok, should be filled with earth and turned into the ground. An estimated cost of the healing project measures in the tens of millions of euros, which would include a particular area where the contaminated sludge would be transferred and treated. Specific species of trees have to be selected for the reforestation and still the land would have to be filled with at least a meter thick layer of humus before the planting. Efforts to plant seedlings in the soil as it was, were unsuccessful as they all withered.

In 2011 several local environmental organizations decided to save at least some part of Ada Huja. Revitalization project covered an area of 12 ha (30 acres) on the tip of the peninsula. They cleaned and treated the land turning it into the park with five gardens, 500 tree seedlings and over 2,000 other plants. The project was declared one of the top 25 ecological projects in Europe. Previously, 2,000 m^{3} (71,000 cu ft) of garbage had to be removed and 500 m^{3} (18,000 cu ft) of humus was poured instead. Sand and gravel were also poured for the children playgrounds to be formed on them, and a classroom was built for the students. Named Supernatural Park, the project also included polytunnels for growing vegetables and a birdwatching tower. The project was abandoned in 2017. The planned Ada Huja Bridge should go over the former park area.

In 2012 environmentalists suggested construction of the pontoon bridge, bicycle path and the bird watch tower as there are six pairs of white-tailed eagles living in Ada Huja. Experts also suggested for the pipe to be conducted below Ada Huja, connecting the main flow of the Danube with Rukavac. That way, strong and constant influx of water would naturally clean the now dead Rukavac. As of 2019, none of the propositions have been achieved.

On 15 April 2017 city government announced yet another project for one section of Ada Huja. It is an amalgam of all the previous ones and envisions a modern residential-commercial complex (including highrise), removal of the industrial zone, new bridge over the Danube, cleaning of the area and construction of the sewage system. Majority of the locality, which in total should cover 100 ha (250 acres), will be adapted as the excursion ground with green areas and sport facilities, like on Ada Ciganlija. The project is only in the proposition stage as no preparations have been done.

By September 2019, Ada Huja remained one of the major ecological black spot in Belgrade, with toxic sludge, mounds of garbage and constant saturation with the wastewater. Situation in the Rukavac has been described as a "true urban ecocide" and an open cesspit, as the drainage of the sewage from the uphill neighborhoods (Karaburma, Rospi Ćuprija, Višnjica, Mirijevo) continued. The swimming is strictly forbidden while the sailing is considered unsafe due to the floating garbage, despite the existing berth in the Marina Višnjica. All plans for revitalization were postponed until the sewage and wastewater are conducted into the projected water treatment facility in Veliko Selo.

On 30 August 2021, city assembly voted to erect a monument in Ada Huja, dedicated to the former local fishermen. The monument will be titled "Alaski krst" ("Fishermen's Cross"). The cross was unveiled in March 2022. It is 8 metres (26 ft) tall, with 40 historical local fishermen families named on the pedestal, and inscription: "They lived and still live on the Danube and off the Danube. Their descendants continued their ways, as long as the Danube will flow". The cross was already erected in 1922, when it was made of oak, but the new Communist authorities demolished it in 1945.

In December 2021, city announced that Ada Huja will not be urbanized at all, and that it will be transformed into the urban forest or the park. It is a resurrection of the former idea to create a green oasis similar to Ada Ciganlija. The only section where the construction will be allowed is the area along the Pančevo Bridge, or some 10% of the total area of 80 hectares (200 acres). This way, it is planned as a sort of eastern extension of the planned linear park, which will start in the Savamala neighborhood, along the Sava river. City estimated that the healing of the polluted land will cost over €20 million, which would make any construction unfeasible for the investors. City officials rejected the idea that forming of the forested area, instead of the urbanized neighborhood, came under pressure from growing, regular ecological protests all over Serbia. Official plan should be adopted in March 2022, and removal and resettling of the existing industrial facilities and slums, and transformation into the park should be finished by 2024.

In April 2022, the deadline was moved to 2025, though no works began yet. Design competition for the entire area is planned for 2023. It was also announced that the paper factory can't be moved from Ada Huja at least until 2039, because that was stipulated by the contract the factory made with the state. On 13 November 2022, the skatepark was opened in Ada Huja. It was ceremonially opened by the prime minister Ana Brnabić, who claimed that park was built from the funds of the ruling Serbian Progressive Party. On the same day, additional 300 tree seedling were planted.

In July 2023, the Irish company Smurfit Kappa which owns the paper factory, announced that testing of the facility for water treatment will start in August before becoming fully operational in September. As the factory works with recycling only, it uses up to 2,500 m^{3} (88,000 cu ft) of water daily, which is then released into the Danube. The water will be treated biologically, using "good bacteria". The first facility of its kind in Belgrade, it was opened on 29 September 2023.

== Ada Huja Bridge ==
Every Belgrade's general urban plan (GUP) since the mid-1950s included the bridge over the Danube, connecting the neighborhoods of Višnjica and Krnjača, over Ada Huja. Parallel to the existing Pančevo Bridge, and projected east of it, the Ada Huja bridge was always envisioned as the important freight transport route. In 2005 city administration announced the construction of the bridge which was to last for 3 years. In April 2008 the construction was announced again, but in March 2009 it was said that it is not a priority. New announcement came in September 2016 with a deadline for the complete paperwork to be finished set at the end of 2017 or early 2018. The bridge will be part of the future Belgrade City Middle Ring Road. In April 2017 city officials stated that the construction of the bridge will start "soon".

In April 2018 it was announced that work on the conceptual design and feasibility study began and that it will be finished by the mid-2019. Deputy mayor Goran Vesić stated in July 2018 that the construction will commence in 2020. In May 2019, he moved start of the construction to 2021. In September 2020, Marko Stojčić, Belgrade's chief urbanist said the bridge will be built in 2022.

However, only in March 2023, Direction for the Urban Development and Construction, which is tasked with construction of the bridge, filed a "motion for the acceptance of the study on the estimated effects on the environment", as the first step in the process. The selected location is 2.6 km (1.6 mi) downstream from the existing Pančevo Bridge.

== Paradajz Island ==
Across the easternmost tip of Ada Huja, due to the alluvial silt brought by the Danube, another smaller island formed across the bank of Višnjica. Because of its originally round shape, it was named Paradajz (“tomato”). It has been growing ever since and is now more ovally shaped.

== Sources ==
- Beograd - plan grada; M@gic M@p, 2006; ISBN 86-83501-53-1
