= Paradajz =

River island in Belgrade, Serbia

Native name: Парадајз
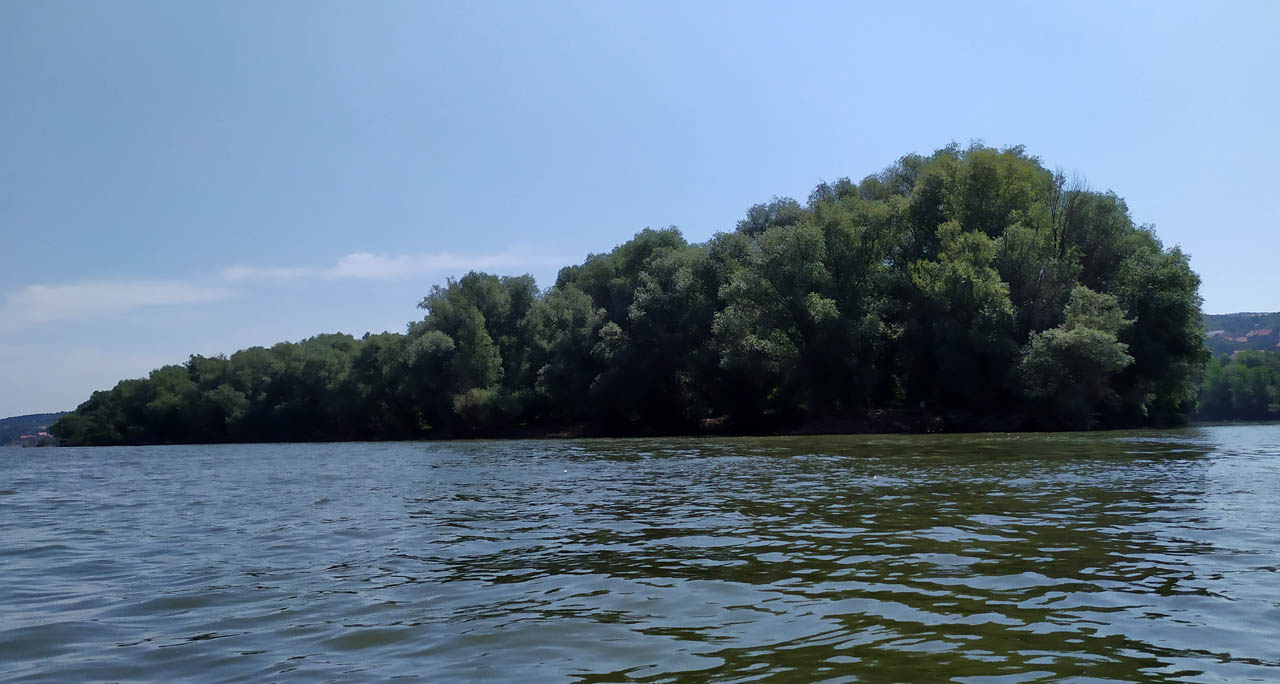
- Paradajz river island, Serbia

- Location within Serbia
- Interactive map of Paradajz

Geography
- Location: Višnjica
- Coordinates: 44.827800°N 20.540045°E
- Archipelago: Ada Huja
- Area: 2 ha (4.9 acres)

Administration
- Serbia
- City of Belgrade: Municipality of Palila

Demographics
- Population: no resident population

Paradajz (Serbian: Парадајз) is an ada, a river island in the Danube, in Belgrade, Serbia. It is located east of Ada Huja, an erstwhile island turned into the peninsula, making its natural extension. It is located in the municipality of Palilula.

== Location ==
The Paradajz is located across the easternmost tip of Ada Huja and right in front of the banks of the neighborhood of Višnjica, approximately at the Danube's 1,163 km (723 mi).

== Geography ==
The island began to form around 1986, due to the alluvial silt brought by the Danube. By 2011, it grew to an area of 2 ha (4.9 acres). As the island expanded, it formed a canal in front of Višnjica. The canal is named "Karlica" and is today considered the better access path to Ada Huja's bay of Rukavac where the Višnjica Marina is located. The island was originally round but by 2017 it got elongated and grew into the almost perfectly symmetrical eye shape.

Name of the island, Paradajz, means tomato in Serbian language. One theory is that it got the name thanks to its original round shape. Another one claims that the name originates from the tomatoes which began to grow wild on the island.

== Wildlife ==
Paradajz is heavily forested. In 2012, planting of the common osier began on the island in order to clean and filter the waters on the shore.

== Human interaction ==
Belgraders began to visit the island from 2006. First major work on Paradajz was done in 2011, when in the period of six months the island was cleaned from the waste brought constantly to the shores by the Danube. The overgrowth was partially cleared and small green zones are created. Using only wooden material from the island, wooden amphitheater and a futsal court were built. Dry and cleared wood was ground into the sawdust which was used for the creation of a 2 km (1.2 mi) long trim trail which circles around the island.
