= Deponija, Belgrade =

Neighborhood of Belgrade

Coordinates: 44.821805°N 20.496160°E

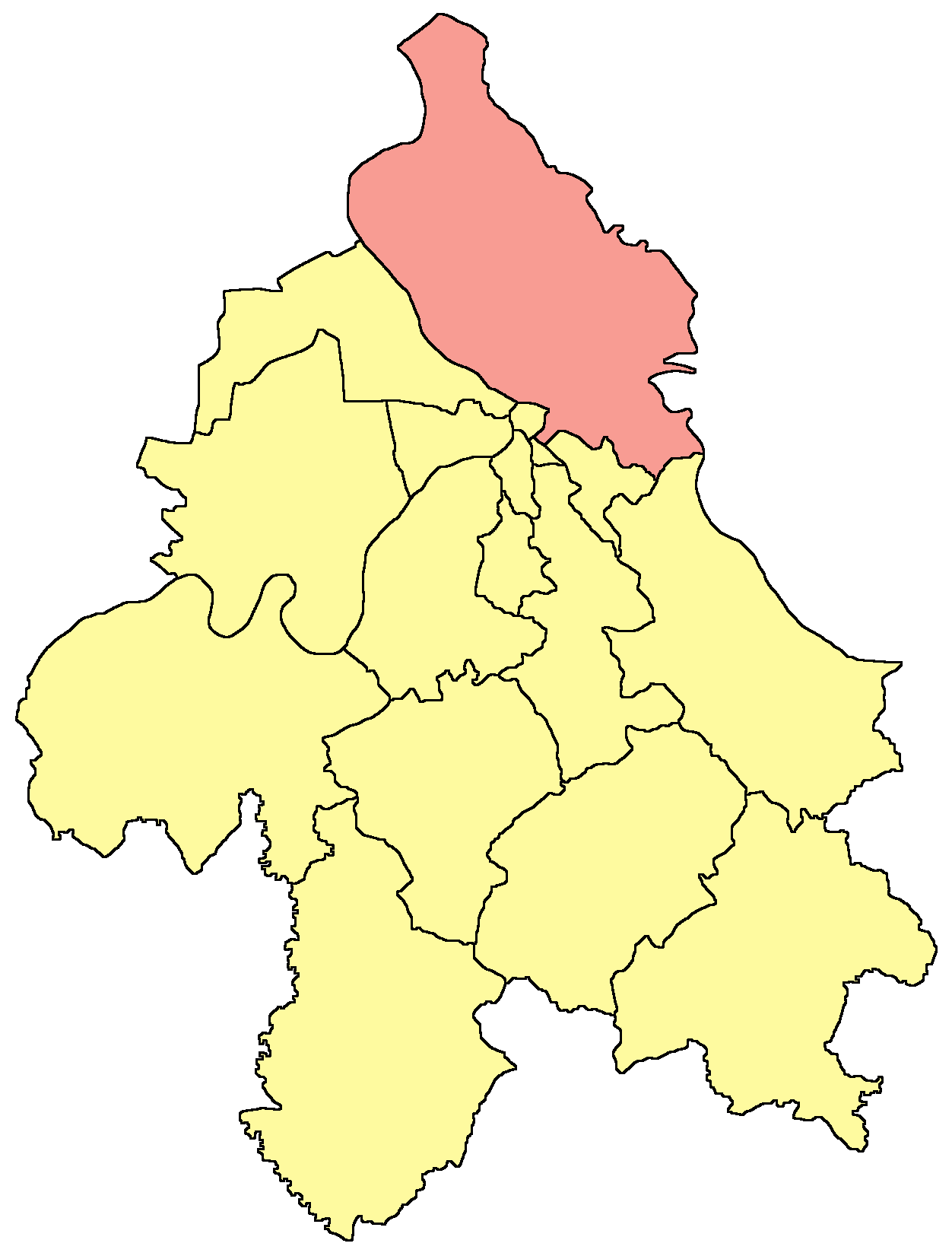
Province of Palilula, Belgrade

Deponija (Serbian Cyrillic: Депонија) is an urban neighborhood (informal settlement) of Belgrade, the capital of Serbia. It is located in Belgrade's municipality of Palilula. As the settlement developed around the Vuka Vrčevića Street, and former industrial zone in it, it is sometimes referred to as the Vuk Vrčević settlement.

== Location ==
Deponija is located under the Pančevo bridge, spawning along the Vuka Vrčevića street, near the right bank of the Danube. It is bordered by the neighborhood of Ada Huja to the east, Viline Vode to the west and Bogoslovija to the south.

== History ==
Deponija is actually a slum, Brazilian type favela, officially classified as an unhygienic settlement. Settling of the area began in the mid 1970s. As the area became informal (wild) landfill (deponija, Serbian for landfill, thus the name), tens of thousands of cubic meters of garbage were dumped in the area in the next few decades.

Major influx of population occurred after the expulsion of the non-Albanian population from Kosovo after the Kosovo War in 1999. Romani people who took refuge in Germany were deported back to Serbia and some of them settled in the area. Already as of 2000/01, name Deponija emerged as a name of the settlement.

It is estimated that Deponija is the largest of the 15 unhygienic settlements in the territory of the municipality of Palilula where altogether 15,000 people live. The exact number of population of Deponija itself is not known and the estimates vary from 900 to 2,000. After cleaning and destruction of Kartonsko naselje in Novi Beograd, it is the largest slum of Belgrade.

== Quality of life and future ==
Some NGOs claim it has the worst conditions of any unhygienic settlements in Belgrade, but the case of the Goveđi Brod in Zemun, recently destroyed by the Danube floods, is probably even worse. However Deponija do have some of the worst life conditions as it has absolutely no sewage and electricity and only very small number of houses have running water.

Along the crossroads of two central streets, a massive illegal dump is constantly being formed. The authorities occasionally remove the garbage, but the pile of waste forms immediately. The pile which was removed in the spring of 2022 had 3,000 cubic metres (110,000 cu ft), and was the largest illegal dump on the territory of the Palilula municipality. In May 2022, city announced that a fenced, public recycling drop-off will be formed on the location, which should solve the problem.

Houses are made of hot clay and dried mud, cardboard and tin, between the hillocks of garbage and feces-infested ponds of dirty water. For the time being, the problem can't be solved as informal settlements can be turned into formal ones (which would mean the city government would have to introduce power, sewage, water) only if they are built on city land, and the ownership of the land that Deponija is built on is disputed. Port of Belgrade, which was acquired by the Serbian tycoon Milan Beko, claims ownership of the entire city's right bank of the Danube, including this area, too. The city has been suing the Port for years, where one court would decide that city is the owner, and then the higher court would say differently and so on. Port of Belgrade stated that it is not in their jurisdiction to deal with the problem. The project of relocating population from Deponija to the new container-based temporary settlement in Reva, neighborhood of Krnjača, from 2003, remained on paper only.

In December 2021, city announced that the entire Ada Huja will remain unurbanized, and that it will be transformed into the urban forest. The only section where the construction will be allowed is the area along the Pančevo Bridge, or some 10% of the total area of 80 hectares (200 acres). This is exactly the area where Deponija is located. Official plan should be adopted in March 2022, and removal and resettling of the existing industrial facilities and slums, and transformation into the park should be finished by 2024.
