= Toblerone, Karaburma =

Karaburma Residential Housing Tower or Toblerone
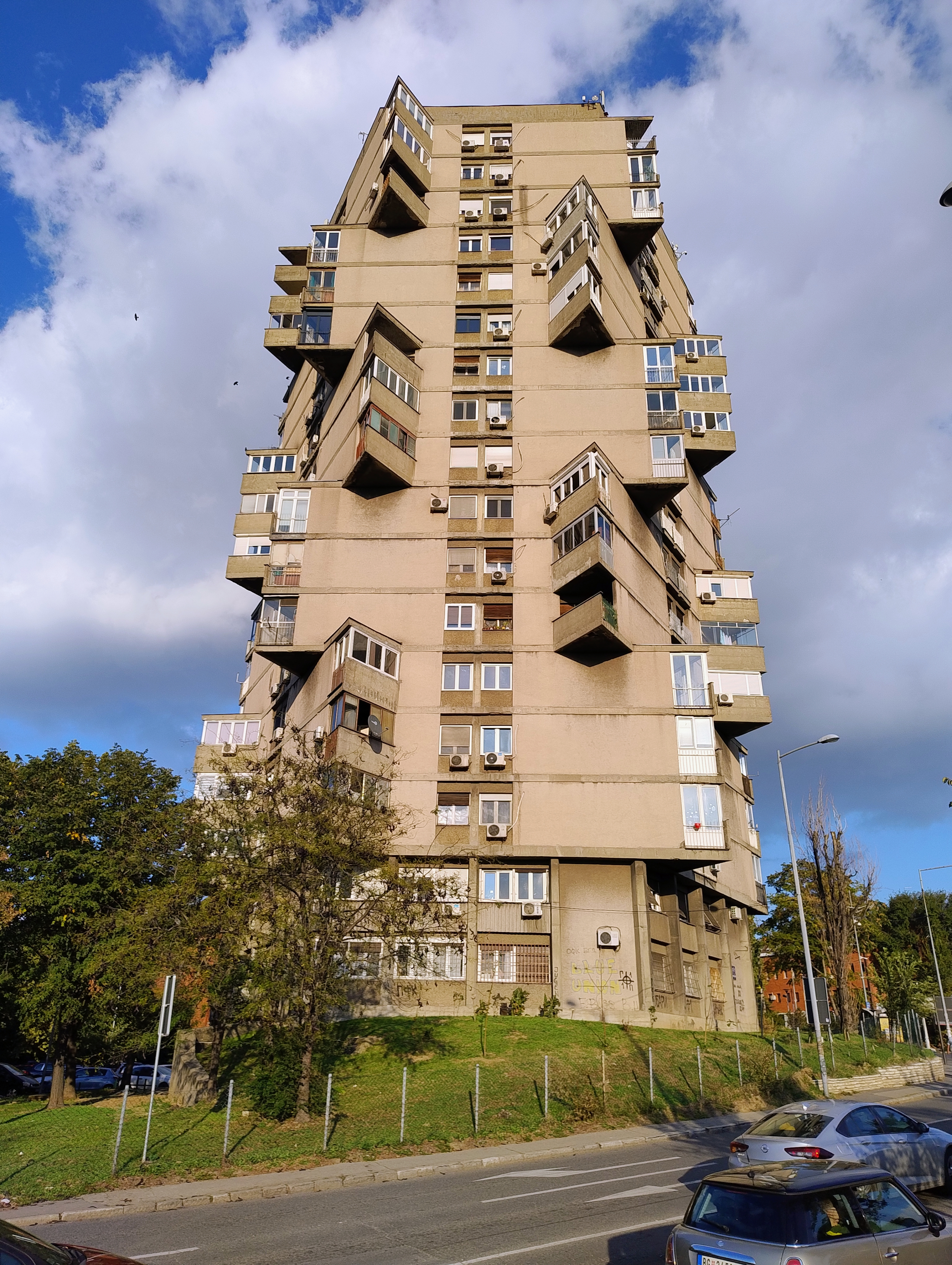
- Toblerone - Belgrade's skyscraper

General information
- Type: multifunctional
- Location: 9 Mija Kovačević Street; Karaburma, Belgrade, Serbia
- Coordinates: 44°48′56″N 20°29′28″E
- Construction started: 1960
- Completed: 1963
- Opening: 1963
- Client: Belgrade City

Technical details
- Floor count: 17
- Lifts/elevators: 2

Design and construction
- Architect: Risto Šekerinski (design)
- Structural engineer: Slobodan Romić (statics)

Karaburma Residential Housing Tower or Toblerone (Serbian Cyrillic: Тоблероне, romanized: Toblerone) is an apartment building located in the eastern part of the Serbian capital Belgrade, in the Karaburma district. The brutalist skyscraper is located at 9 Mija Kovačević Street. The Omladinski Stadium and the Orthodox Theological Faculty are located nearby; this city district is called Bogoslovija.

== Name ==
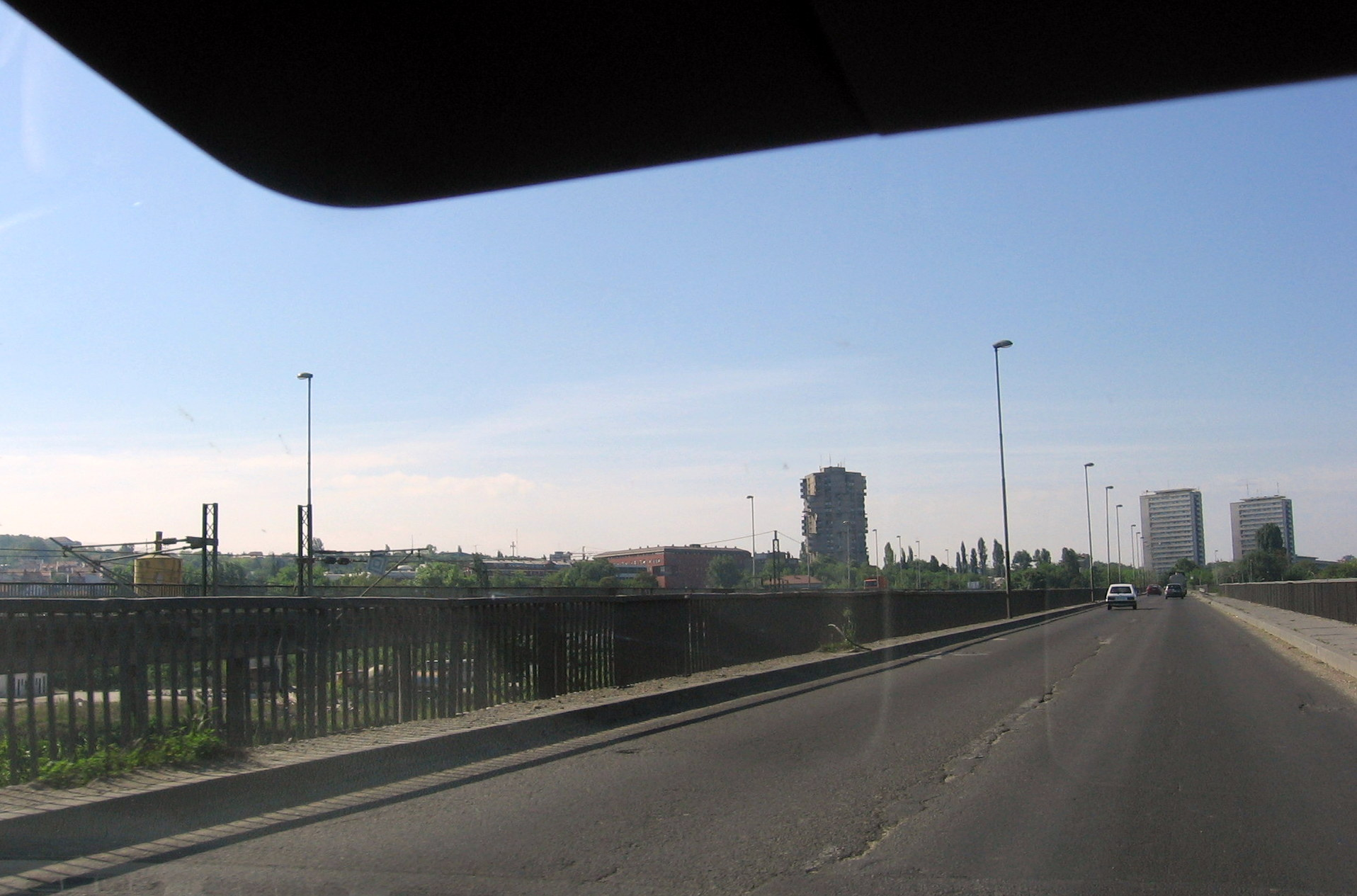
Toblerone is, together with the Theology, clearly visible from the Pančevo Bridge

Locals often refer to this tower block as the Toblerone Tower (Serbian Cyrillic: Кула Тоблероне, romanized: Kula Toblerone), deriving from the triangular shapes incorporated into the tower's design. The name comes from the Swiss chocolate Toblerone, which is known for its distinctive shape.

The residents of the nearby student dormitory »Karaburma«, in addition to New Cemetery, refer to the building with other nicknames, such as "Mace-wielding" or "Prince Marko' mace". Less common nicknames include "Profesor woman" and "Hedgehog".

In English, this skyscraper is officially called Karaburma residential housing tower.

== Unusual skyscraper ==
=== Residential building and observation tower ===
The tallest building in Karaburma is therefore a residential tower, which could be called a skyscraper as it is much taller than the famous Nebotičnik in Slovenian capital of Ljubljana and also has four more floors, i.e. seventeen.

It was designed by the architect Risto Šekerinski; started in 1960 and completed in 1963 it is located at 9 Mija Kovačević Street next to the Orthodox Theology, which is part of the University of Belgrade. It rises right next to the Pančevo Bridge, which connects Serbia proper with Vojvodina.

Each room had its own telephone at a time when they were still extremely rare. At that time, there were neither mobile phones nor smartphones; in fact, the telephone was a real rarity; in 1969, Toblerone had 104 connections installed, as this building was conceived as a residential tower for Belgrade university. The entire building is circular inside, has two elevators and triangular terraces.

At first glance, one gets the impression that several institutions are piled up in one location: a roundabout, then a skyscraper, behind it in the traditional, medieval Serbian style "The Orthodox Theological Faculty of Belgrade "Sveti Sava"; on the other side of the road is the remains of the stadium OFK Beograd.

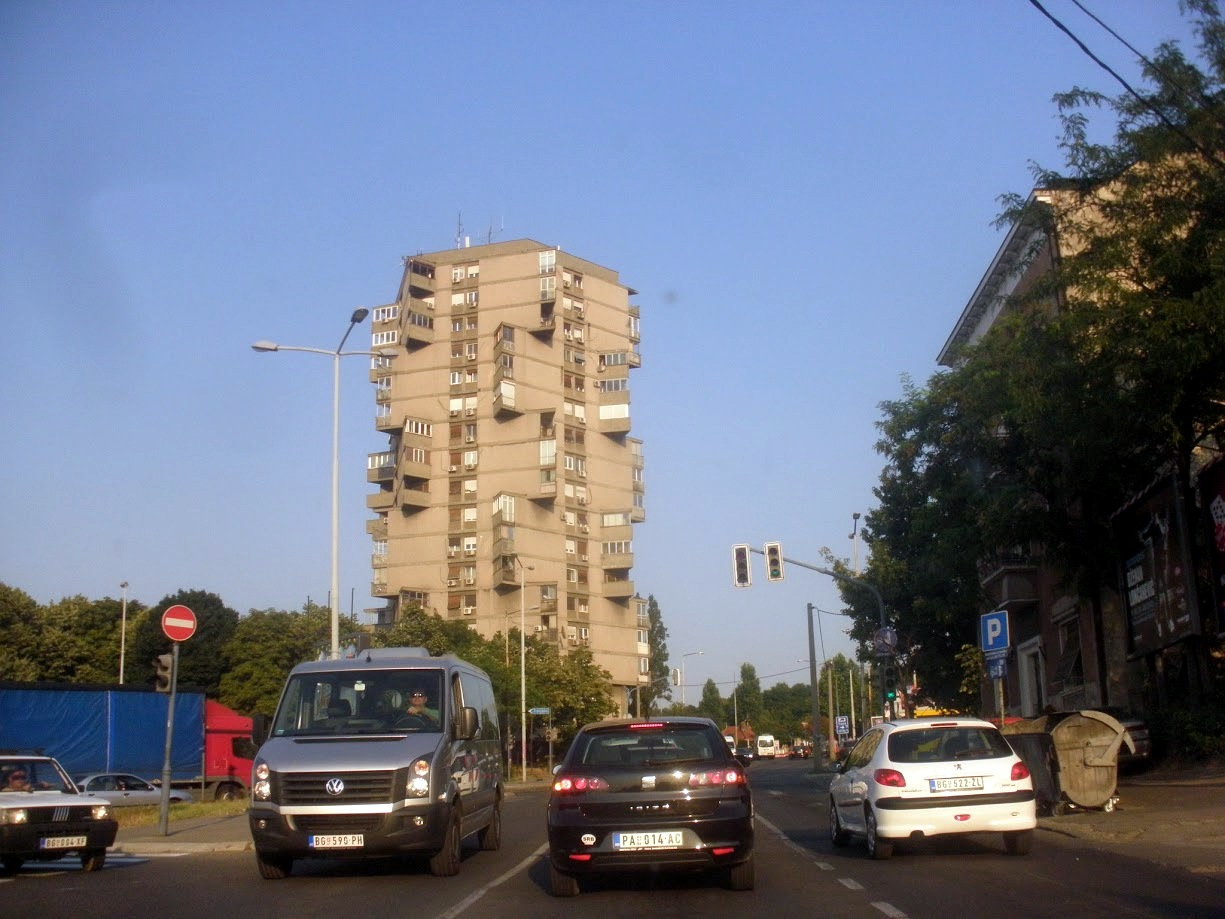
There is always traffic jams around the "ugly" Toblerone on top of Karaburma

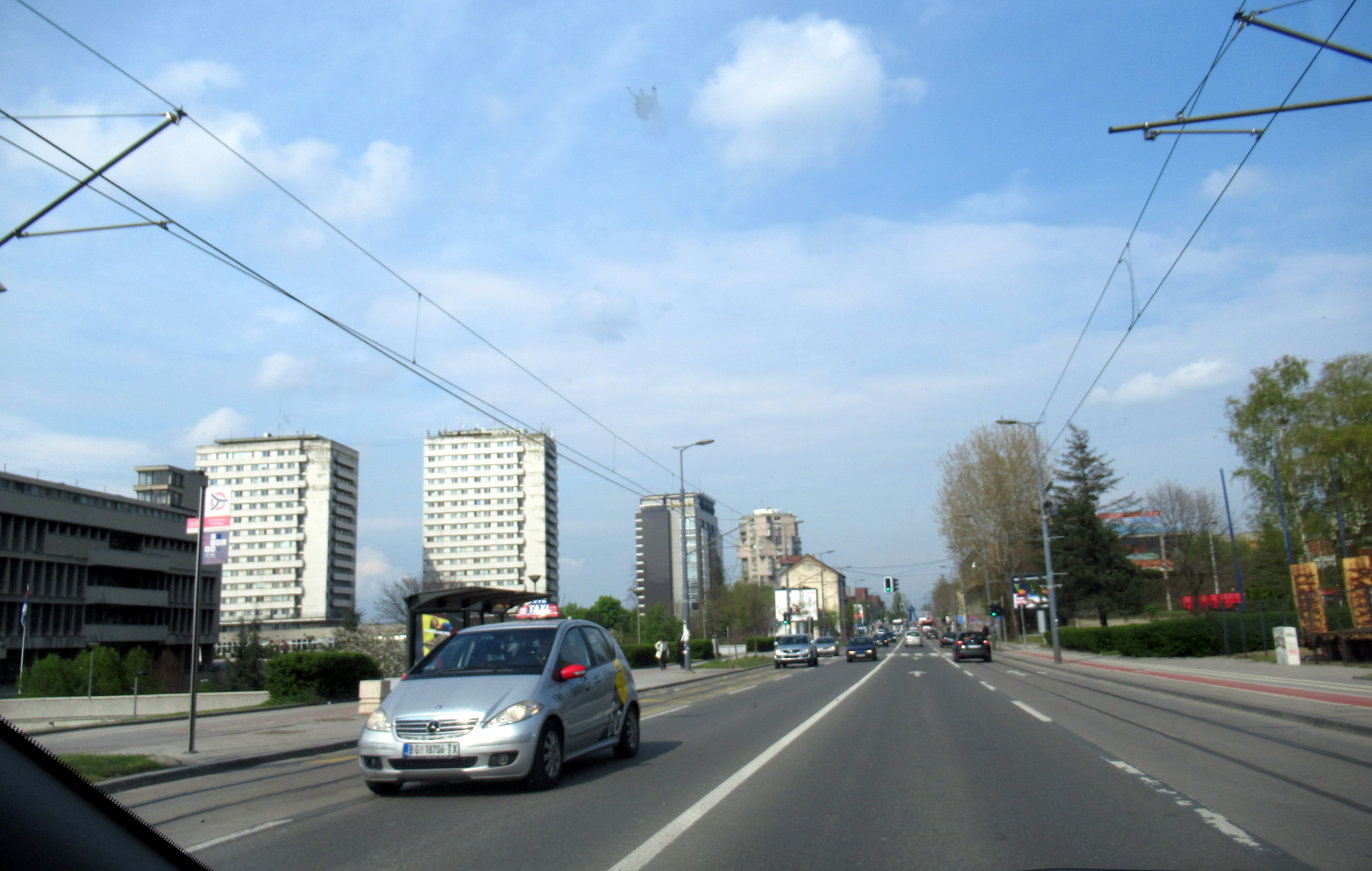
The Toblerone is surrounded by buildings built in the then brutal Yugoslavian style.

The tower block was incloded among the "five ugliest buildings in Belgrade". it is also listed among the ten unusual; or among the seven most unusual Belgrade buildings.

The building won an award for architectural design at the time of its construction. The static calculation for the erection of the tallest reinforced concrete structure in this section made of prestressed concrete was carried out by engineer Romić.

=== Toblerone II ===
There is another similar building in Belgrade, which is called "Toblerone II"; this is because it is quite similar to the "real" Toblerone next to the Theological Seminary, the New Cemetery and the OFK stadium of Karaburma; however, this building also has another "affectionate" name, and it is also called the "Single Hotel": (Serbian Cyrillic: Самачки хотел, romanized: Samački hotel) the first name is for its shape, the second for its purpose. This building is located in the old center of Belgrade – in Dorćol.

=== Brutalist architecture ===
Brutalist architecture has attracted interest from visitors and architecture enthusiasts in general - and particularly for the Yugoslavian direction, which is still receiving continued attention in a significant part of Belgrade.

== See also ==
- Karaburma
- Brutalist architecture
- Reinforced concrete
- Bogoslovija, Belgrade
