= Bela Stena =

Beach in Serbia

Coordinates: 44°50′56″N 20°35′15″E

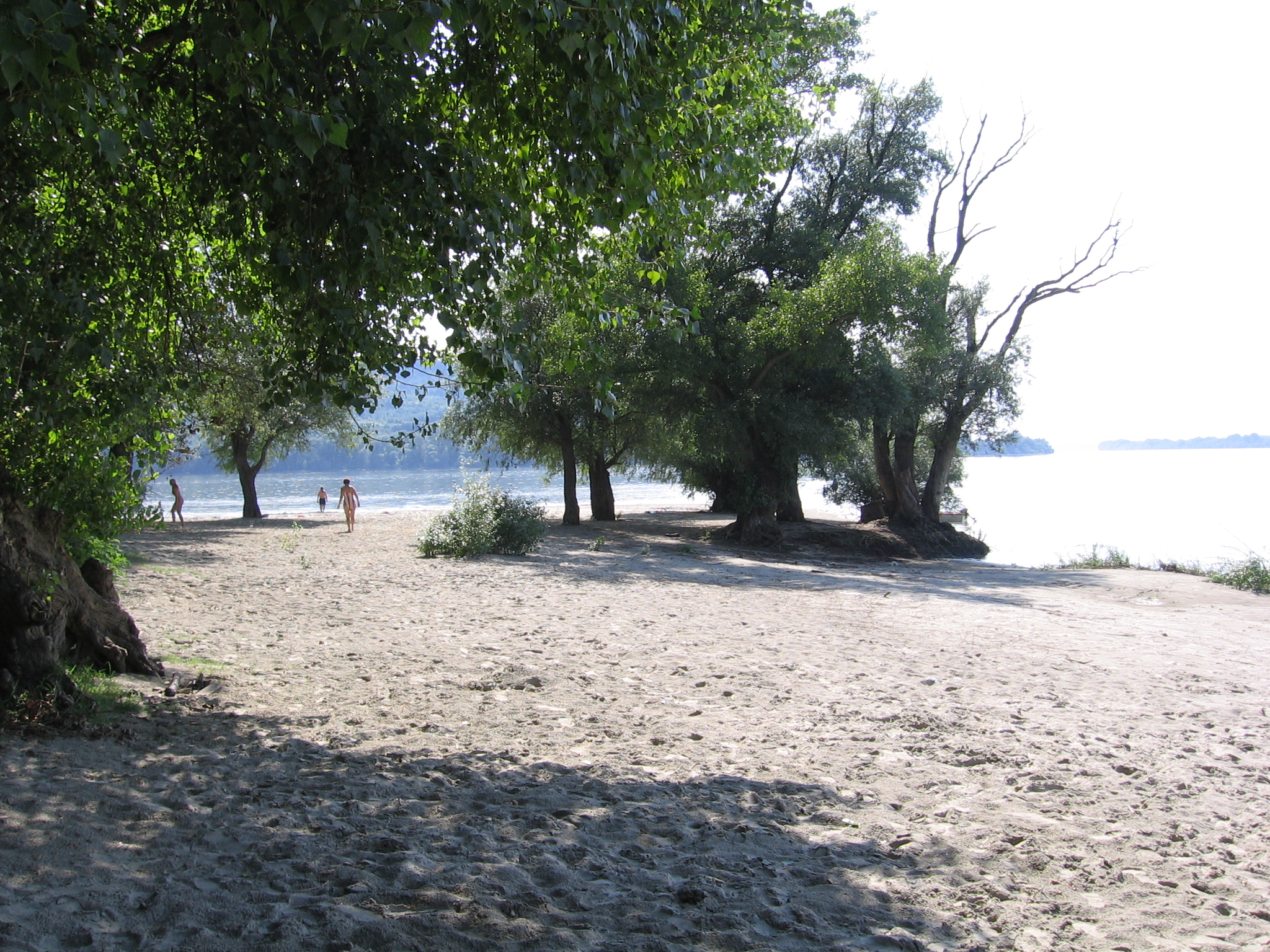
Bela Stena beach

Bela Stena (Serbian: Бела Стена) is an island resort in the Danube, located in the city of Pančevo in Serbia.

== Location ==
Bela Stena is located 12 km (7.5 mi) from downtown Belgrade, on the western tip of the island of Forkontumac.

== Lido ==
After World War I, Kingdom of the Serbs, Croats and Slovenes was formed, and the Danube ceased being a northern border of Serbia. Hence, the island of Forkontumac stopped being on the very borderline. Members of the Pančevo Youth Association organized fundraising and formed a society for establishing a beach ("bath") on the Forkontumac, where present Bela Stena is. In 1921, 20 cabins were placed on the beach, so as tables, chairs, a barrack which hosted a buffet, and shelters for guardsmen and cabin boys. The society leased a motorboat and a barge to transport citizens to the island. The beach was named Lido, after Lido di Venezia.

It took some time for the beach to gain popularity among the citizens of Pančevo, but in 1922 additional 30 cabins were built on Lido which became a major excursion site for entire families. On 2 August 1923, around 16:00, it turned dark, and a massive storm hit the beach. Wind knocked down and destroyed all cabins, barrack and shelters, throwing planks all over. After only 30 minutes the beach was completely destroyed. Visitors, mostly children and women at the time, panicked. Their family members in Pančevo flocked to the city port, pleading the port authority's captain to send boats to the island to save the "castaways".

== Characteristics ==
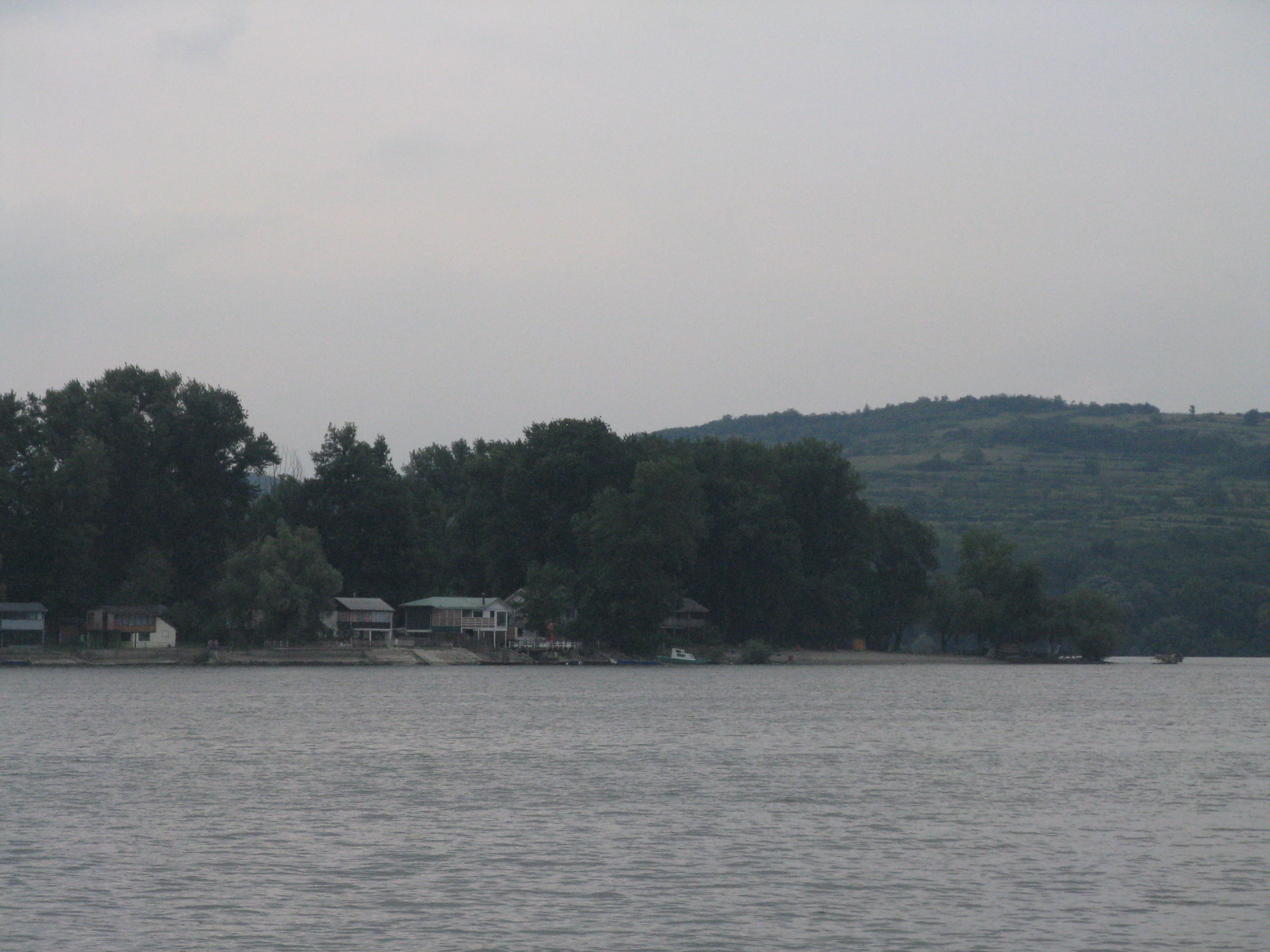
Bela stena from the river

The name, bela stena, is descriptive, meaning white rock in Serbian. Allegedly, when the landslide occurred on the island, to the distant fishermen from Višnjica and Veliko Selo it appeared as the white rocks. Bela Stena is actually a weekend settlement, without resident population. It has almost 500 vacation homes owned by the citizens of Belgrade and Pančevo, many of which are abandoned or put up for sale.

Bela Stena is officially classified as the wild beach. It means it has no lifeguard service and the ambulance. Further, it has no electricity or the running water. Also, the open fire is forbidden, so the visitors light fire in the holes they dig in the sand on the beach. There are four fish restaurants which use power generators. A small beach made it a popular resort in the 1970s and 1980s, when the population grew to 20,000 over the weekends. It was especially popular as a destination for children's tourism. But little has been done to improve the conditions, especially in terms of traffic accessibility. With the rapid expansion and modernization of Ada Ciganlija, close to downtown Belgrade, and the emergence of the Lido beach near Zemun, Bela Stena gradually became less popular, though it is estimated that some 7,000 people still visit over the weekends during summer season.

Walking to the furthest extension of the beach to the east, the lighthouse of the Pančevo lighthouse tower at the mouth of the Timiș River into the Danube. The entire central and eastern part of the Forkontumac is an undisturbed lush green area. Beach itself is surrounded by the grove of the Canadian poplars.
