= Viline Vode =

Coordinates: 44°49′43″N 20°29′31″E

- Interactive map of Viline Vode
- Country: Serbia
- Time zone: UTC+1 (CET)
  - Summer (DST): UTC+2 (CEST)

Viline Vode (Serbian Cyrillic: Вилине воде) is an urban neighborhood of Belgrade, the capital of Serbia. It is located in Belgrade's municipality of Palilula.

== Location ==
Viline Vode is located on the right bank of the Danube, stretching from under the Pančevo bridge to the west. It borders the neighborhoods of Stari Grad on the west, Ada Huja and Deponija on the east and Bogoslovija on the south.

== History ==
In the early 19th century, area was known as Ladne Vode ("Cold Waters") and was a distant periphery of Belgrade. It was the location where many streams, flowing down from Karaburma, were reaching the Danube. It became the vacation and excursion location for city Turks. They were later replaced by the families of the Belgrade Jews who were living in the neighborhood of Jalija, or the Lower Dorćol. After the 1860s, and complete withdrawal of the Turks from Serbia, Serbian families, especially those of clerks and notaries, began to spend free time in Ladne Vode.

Neighborhood's name was changed after the former numerous hot springs on the bank of the Danube as Viline Vode is Serbian for fairy waters. Originally, the western border of the neighborhood was the Church of St. Alexander Nevsky. The springs were capped when the railway and the "Beograd-Dunav" station were built in the mid 1930s. The oldest industrial building in Belgrade is located in Viline Vode. It was projected by Miloš Savčić as an administrative building for the nearby slaughterhouse. Later, it was adapted into the hotel which was oddly named "Klanica" (Serbian for slaughterhouse). Built in 1897–1898, It was the first industrial slaughterhouse in Belgrade. Apart from the abattoir and administrative building, the entire complex around it also included the social housing for the workers, a kafana, central kitchen, etc.

There was also a complex of social housing built by the industrialist Vlada Ilić for the workers of his Belgrade Textile Industry. Another social housing project for its workers was built by the “Prometna Banka” within the industrial complex of its sawmill, which was located where the Port of Belgrade is today.

In the 1980s ambitious plans were developed for Viline Vode which were supposed to transform the neighborhood from industrial into the wealthy residential one with blocks of villas and small residential buildings. City authorities claimed it will be "Belgrade's Santa Barbara" but the idea was completely dropped, and neighborhood was left as it was.

In 2019, a plan was announced for the block bounded by the Poenkareova Street and Despot Stefan Boulevard. It includes abandoned factories of "Sutjeska" and "Belgrade Cotton Combinat" (BPK). Developer "Delta Holding", which purchased BPK in 2007, originally announced construction of a massive shopping mall instead of the existing derelict industrial complex in 2008. The project was named "Deltalend", and was to be finished by 2011, but construction never began. The project came under the public scrutiny in the late 2022, when two fires broke out, destroying the "Sutjeska" building, a month a half apart. In public opinion, the fires are generally thought to be planted. In February 2023, the company announced that a residential-commercial complex will be built instead of a shopping mall, while two of the existing old buildings will be preserved due to their architectural values. Works started on 17 October 2023, and the project will be finished by 2027.

== Characteristics ==
Viline Vode is one of few Belgrade's neighborhoods that are entirely industrial. Among many such facilities it comprises TEMPO cash-and-carry center, several gravel and sand extracting companies on the Danube's bank, Beograd put, Centroprom, Martez, Tehnohemija, Jugopapir, Duga, Avala cardboard factory, Balkan, Keprom, eastern part of the Port of Belgrade and the railway station Beograd-Dunav.

City's general urban plan (GUP) from 1972 projected the removal of the Port of Belgrade and the industrial facilities by 2021. The cleared area was to encompass the Danube's bank from the Dorćol to the Pančevo bridge. At that time, the proposed new locations included the Veliko Selo marsh or the Reva 2 section of Krnjača, across the Danube. When the GUP was revised in 2003, it kept the idea od relocating the port and the industry, and as the new location only Krnjača was mentioned. There was an idea that the already existing port of Pančevo, after certain changes, could become the new Belgrade's port, but the idea was abandoned.

There is a small, pentagonal square, bounded by the Vojvode Dobrnjca, Venizelosova, Knez Miletina and Carigradska streets. It was adapted into the park, which covers 0.18 hectares (0.44 acres). Monument to Eleftherios Venizelos was placed in the park in 2004, so park colloquially became known as the Venizelos Park.

== Sources ==
- Beograd - plan grada; M@gic M@p, 2006; ISBN 86-83501-53-1
- Beograd - plan i vodič; Geokarta, 1999; ISBN 86-459-0006-8
