= Višnjica, Serbia =

Višnjica Вишњица
- Urban neighbourhood
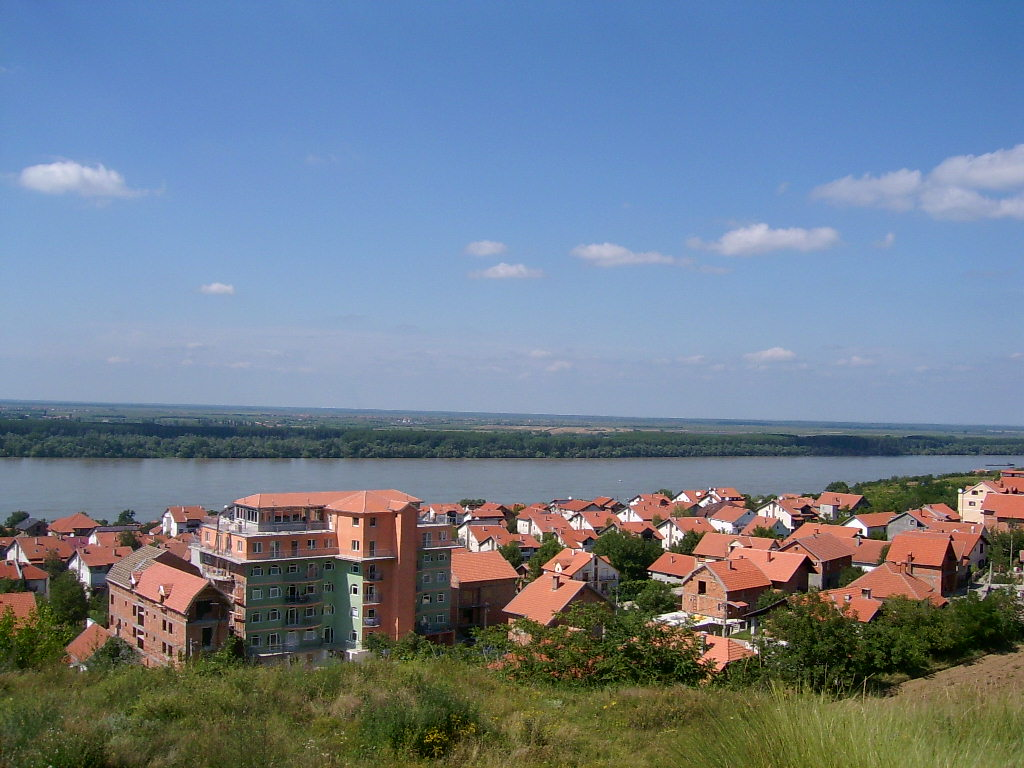
- Picture of Višnjica, overlooking the Danube.

- Location within Belgrade
- Coordinates: 44°49′51″N 20°32′52″E
- Country: Serbia
- Region: Belgrade
- Municipality: Palilula

Area
  - Total: 8.17 km^{2} (3.15 sq mi)

Population (2011)
  - Total: 12.071
  - Density: 1.48/km^{2} (3.83/sq mi)
- Time zone: UTC+1 (CET)
  - Summer (DST): UTC+2 (CEST)
- Area code: +381(0)11
- Car plates: BG

Višnjica (Serbian Cyrillic: Вишњица, pronounced [ʋîʃɲitsa]) is an urban neighborhood of Belgrade, Serbia. It is located in Belgrade's municipality of Palilula.

== Location ==
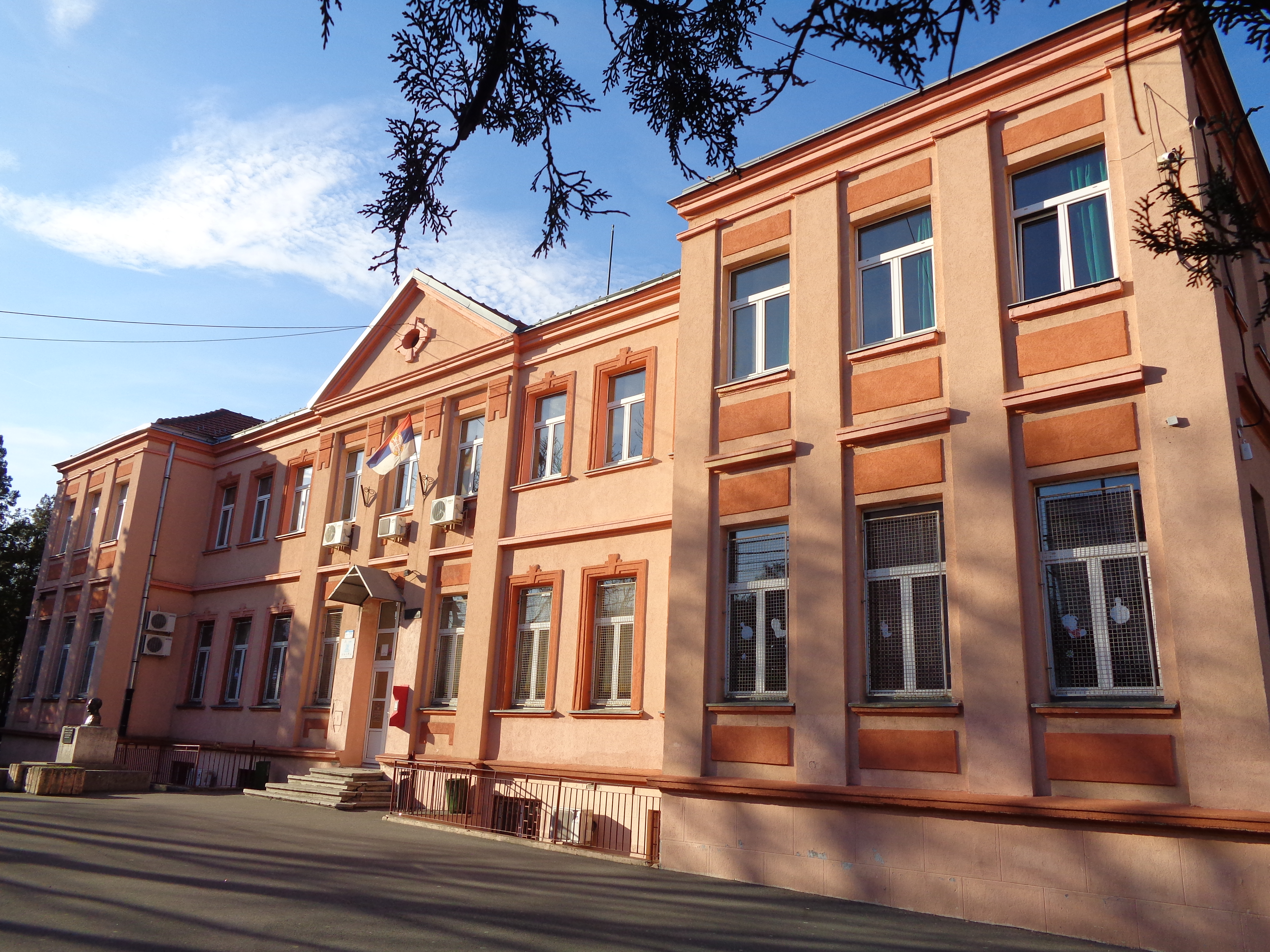
Elementary school in Višnjica

Višnjica is located on the right bank of the Danube, stretching for almost 5 kilometers, from the Danube's arm of Rukavac and Ada Huja peninsula (including the Višnjica marina) almost to the weekend-settlement of Bela Stena. The original village of Višnjica developed between the northern part of the Višnjica field and the Danube, but today makes one continuous built-up area with the rest of the city, through the bordering neighborhoods of Ada Huja, Rospi Ćuprija and Karaburma on the west and its own modern extension of Višnjička Banja, mainly on the south. The main street connecting it to downtown is Višnjička.

== History and population ==
Fossilized teeth of megalodon have been discovered in Višnjica. They are dated to 15 million years ago, when the area was part of Paratethys during the Badenian age. The remains are kept in the Belgrade's Museum of Natural History.

In 1595, the Ottomans built a temporary, pontoon bridge over the Danube, near Višnjica. In the 19th century, while the Sava was a border river between Serbia and Austria, a custom house was located in Višnjica. The area along the Danube was covered in large and thick willow forest. The forest survived until the 1930s.

Until the 1970s, Višnjica was a separate village and a suburban settlement of Belgrade. With the massive administrative reorganization of the Belgrade City limits after the 1971 population census, entire eastern and southern string of more or less urbanized suburbs (Višnjica, Mirijevo, Mali Mokri Lug, Veliki Mokri Lug, Selo Rakovica, Jajinci, Kijevo, Kneževac, Resnik, Železnik, Žarkovo) were administratively annexed to the Belgrade City proper (uža teritorija grada), turning from the separate settlements into the "local communities" (mesna zajednica). Population of Višnjica, according to the official censuses of population:

- 1921 - 1,688
- 1953 - 1,940
- 1961 - 2,720
- 1971 - 5,429
- 1981 - 7,463
- 2002 - 12.108
- 2011 - 12,071

Until 1971, data are for the separate settlement of Višnjica, 1981 is for the local community of Višnjica within Belgrade, and 2002 and 2011 is for the combined local communities of Višnjica and Višnjička Banja.

The name of the neighborhood, Višnjica, is Serbian for the sour cherry orchard. The entire area, stretching from Karaburma and Viline Vode on the east, was known for its thermal springs and healing mud which gave name to the new neighborhood of Višnjička Banja (Serbian for "Višnjica spa").

== Characteristics ==
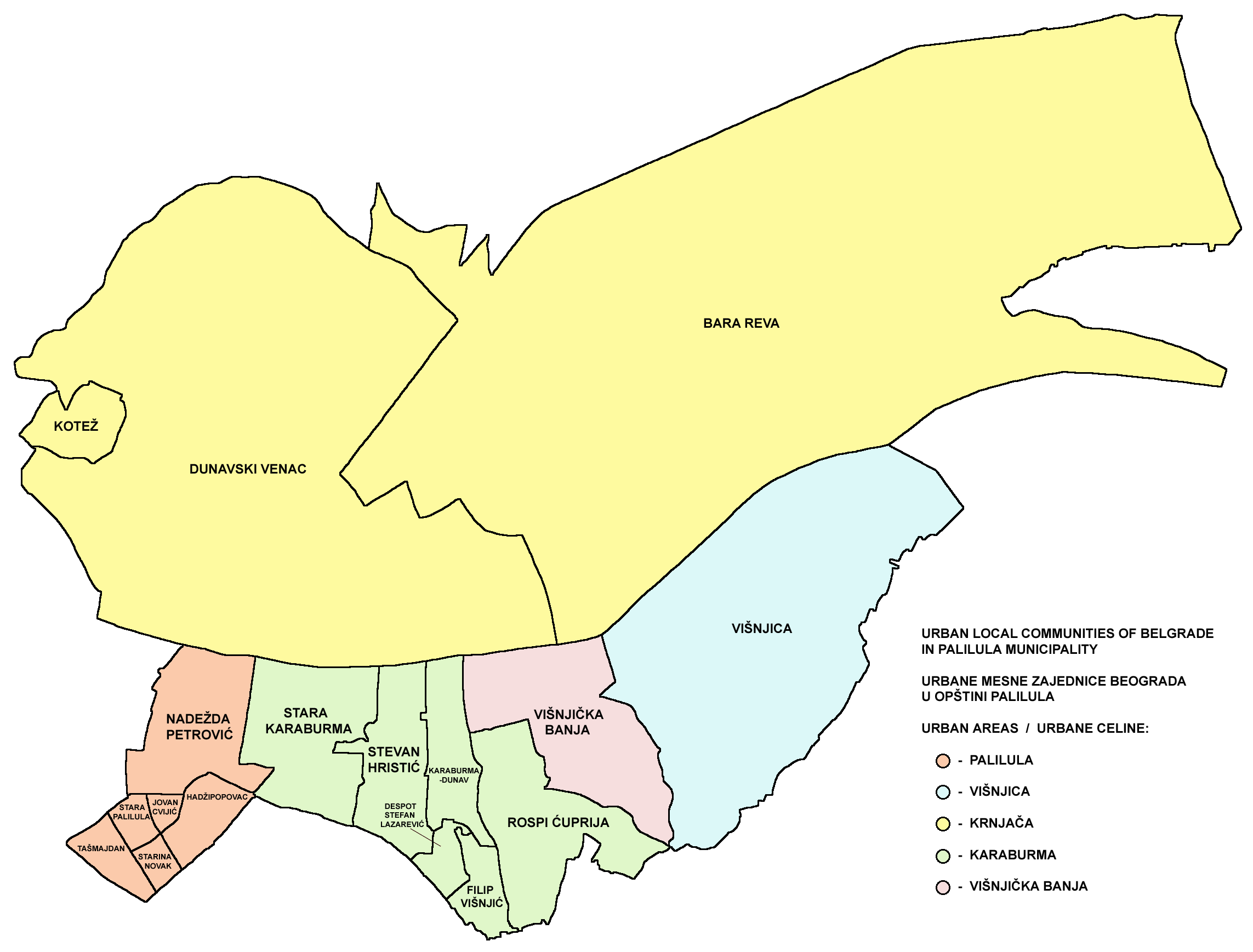
Map of Urban local communities of Belgrade in Palilula municipality

As a former village, Višnjica is a residential area without industrial or commercial facilities. The distance from the downtown (7-8 kilometers) and a bad public transportation are the main communal problems in the neighborhood.

Overlooking the easternmost, wooded section of Ada Huja and the Danube itself, Višnjica, just as Viline Vode closer to downtown, was projected as an elite neighborhood in the project of "Belgrade's descend to the river banks". However, the idea of a rich settlement with villas and mansions was dropped with the economic crisis in former Yugoslavia in the late 1980s and succession of Yugoslav wars in 1990s. Population of the local community of Višnjica, after Višnjička Banja administratively split in the 1990s was 3,611 in 2002 and 4,527 in 2011.

A new island in front of Višnjica, called Paradajz, began to form around 1986, due to the alluvial silt brought by the Danube. Until 2011 it grew to an area of 2 ha (4.9 acres). As the island expanded, it formed a canal in front of Višnjica. Canal is named "Karlica" and is today considered the better access path to Ada Huja's bay of Rukavac where the Višnjica Marina is located. The island was originally round but by 2017 it got elongated and grew into the almost perfectly symmetrical eye shape.

South of Višnjica is the partially forested Milićevo Hill. The forest covers 43.8 ha (108 acres).

== Višnjička Banja ==
Višnjička Banja (Serbian Cyrillic: Вишњичка Бања, pronounced [ʋîʃɲitʃkaː bâɲa]) is located in the northern section of the Višnjica field, between the neighborhoods of Rospi Ćuprija to the west, Lešće to the southeast and Višnjica to the north.

The modern neighborhood was built as an urban connection of the former village of Višnjica to the rest of Belgrade. It was projected by Ljiljana and Dragoljub Bakić. It was named after many thermal springs of the sulfur water and healing mud near Višnjica (Višnjička Banja is Serbian for Višnjica spa). The springs, for the most part, have been artificially shut down and conducted underground into the city's sewage system. The springs are further compromised by the contaminated mud in the Ada Huja's Rukavac.

Planned construction of the neighborhood consisted of several phases, starting in the mid-1960s, when the section right above the Danube was built (today considered the "old" section of the neighborhood). This continued from 1979 to 1982, when the rows of four-storey buildings and houses, ornamented with the red façade bricks, were finished. They became recognizable hallmark of the neighborhood, earning a moniker karingtonke ("Carrington's houses"), as they resembled the mansion of the ultra-rich Carrington family from, in Serbia at the time immensely popular U.S. soap opera Dynasty. This name was later applied to similar buildings in other Belgrade neighborhoods.

The neighborhood was the first planned, fully new, luxurious neighborhood in Belgrade after World War II, and by 1982 this became a full blown public affair. The apartments were built from the money invested by the state owned companies, and were subsequently housed with the workers from those companies. As the apartments in Višnjička Banja were larger than average, the Communist elite at the time protested, claiming that the "apartments are too big for the working class", and that more, but smaller housing units should be built. On the other hand, the state plunged into the severe economic crisis since the late 1970s: shortage of fuel resulted in the odd–even rationing, and later in the fuel stamps; electricity was turned off on a daily basis; stamps for flour, sugar, coffee and edible oil were introduced for the entire population; "luxurious" goods (coffee, chocolate, laundry detergents) became unavailable and were replaced with second-rate products.

Apart from attacking the architects and designers for the large floor areas, which was a common in Belgrade's new buildings at the time, the neighborhood experienced some real issues during the construction, as almost every communal aspect was problematic. This included the problems with conduction of the waterworks from the neighboring Mirijevo, finding a solution for the introduction of heating, and connection to the power grid, as the power generator in Mirijevo, which was planned to supply this part of Belgrade, was fully finished only decades later.

The area is residential, without specific borders with Višnjica itself. Southern section of the neighborhood has many brickworks, but as boundaries of the neighborhoods in Belgrade are mostly arbitrary, some place this industrialized section in Rospi Ćuprija. Local community had a population of 8,497 in 2002 and 7,544 in 2011.

Sub-neighborhood of Kaskade was built in 1978 between the streets of Romena Rolana and Višnjička. It was constructed on the steep slope prone to the mass wasting so the buildings were built on the piles. In an effort to embed the piles into the rocky ground below, the piles had to be 40 meters long.

== Višnjičko Polje ==
The regulatory plan for the construction of the neighborhood of Višnjičko Polje was given green light on 15 May 2007, but never materialized. According to the plan, the future city within the city was supposed to cover an area of 81 hectares with 7,500 apartments with a total area of 900.000 square meters. After Bežanijska Kosa in 1987, this was to be the first grand-scale planned neighborhood of Belgrade.

The neighborhood should be located in the Višnjica field (thus the name). It was to border the neighborhoods of Višnjička Banja on the north, Lešće on the east, and Ćalije and Rospi Ćuprija on the west. Future boundary of the neighborhood would also be the projected internal Belgrade's beltway.

As the inclination of the terrain is 7 to 10%, the neighborhood was to be built in the amphitheater style. Unlike other planned neighborhoods in Belgrade, Višnjičko Polje wasn't planned to ave sky-scrapers: 50% individual houses while only 20% made of four-storey buildings. 600 apartments were planned for the Romani families which currently live in the area in an informal settlement.

The projected neighborhood had two projected centers: Center 1, around the present brickworks Rekord, designed for the culture and commerce, and Centar 2, around the present brickworks Kozara, designed for the sports and recreation. The neighborhood was supposed to have a nursery, kindergarten, elementary school, sports fields, etc. Being a massive project, it was expected that 10 to 12 projecting teams will be building it. The city government decided that the neighborhood will be not built partially, but as a whole.

Vrtača, a water hole artificially created as a result of clay digging for the neighboring brickworks, should remain a reservation of nature to protect the present plant and animal life in it. It is currently inhabited by the egrets, mallards. shelducks, grass snakes, etc.

== Sources ==
- Mala Prosvetina Enciklopedija, Third edition (1986), Vol.I; Prosveta; ISBN 86-07-00001-2
- Jovan Đ. Marković (1990): Enciklopedijski geografski leksikon Jugoslavije; Svjetlost-Sarajevo; ISBN 86-01-02651-6
- Beograd - plan grada; M@gic M@p, 2006; ISBN 86-83501-53-1
- Beograd - plan i vodič; Geokarta, 1999; ISBN 86-459-0006-8
