= Slanci Monastery =

Serbian Orthodox monastery in Belgrade, Serbia

- Манастир Сланци

- Location within Serbia
- Interactive map of Slanci Monastery

Monastery information
- Full name: Monastery of Archdeacon Stephen in Slanci
- Order: Serbian Orthodox
- Denomination: Eastern Orthodox
- Established: 13th century
- Disestablished: 1833
- Reestablished: 1961
- Mother house: Hilandar
- Dedication: Saint Stephen
- Consecrated: 1971
- Celebration: 9 January (new calendar) / 28 December (old calendar)
- Archdiocese: Archdiocese of Belgrade and Karlovci

People
- Founder: Saint Sava (according to tradition) or King Stefan Dragutin (according to another tradition)
- Important associated figures: Stefan Lazarević, Đurađ Branković, Branković dynasty

Architecture
- Functional status: Active
- Completed date: 1971
- Closed: 1833

Site
- Location: Slanci, Palilula, Belgrade
- Country: Serbia
- Coordinates: 44.804166°N 20.570333°E
- Public access: yes

Cultural Heritage of Serbia
- Official name: Манастир Сланци
- Type: Archaeological Site of Exceptional Importance

Slanci Monastery (Serbian: Манастир Сланци, romanized: Manastir Slanci) is a Serbian Orthodox monastery located in the village of Slanci, east of Belgrade, within the municipality of Palilula. It belongs to the Archdiocese of Belgrade and Karlovci of the Serbian Orthodox Church.

== Tradition of origin ==
The official name of the monastery is the Monastery of Archdeacon Stephen in Slanci, dedicated to the saint. According to one tradition, the monastery was founded by Saint Sava at the beginning of the 13th century, while another tradition attributes its founding to King Stefan Dragutin at the end of the same century.

== History ==
The monastery flourished during the period of the Serbian Despotate under Despot Stefan Lazarević and Despot Đurađ Branković, when it was located in the immediate vicinity of the capital, Belgrade. Thanks to the patronage of the Branković dynasty, the monastery changed its previous patronal feast—the Presentation of the Most Holy Theotokos—and adopted a new one: Archdeacon Stephen, the patron saint of the Branković family, celebrated on 9 January (28 December according to the Julian calendar). Because of its importance during this period, the Slanci Monastery was popularly known as the "Great Monastery".

After the fall of the Despotate in 1459, Slanci Monastery was plundered and destroyed, and its monks were killed by the Ottomans. Under Ottoman rule, the monastery shared the fate of the local population and suffered several destructions (in 1690, 1739, and 1787). However, the monks repeatedly returned, and the monastery was restored several times.

During the First Serbian Uprising, initial reconstruction efforts began. However, following the consolidation of power under Prince Miloš Obrenović, while aid was directed to many churches and monasteries, the dilapidated and abandoned monastery in Slanci was not restored. Consequently, in 1833, the remaining structure was demolished, and its building materials were used to construct churches in the neighboring villages of Mirijevo and Veliko Selo. All movable valuables were transferred after the demolition to the church in Veliko Selo, including three icons from an unfinished iconostasis dating to 1812. The site of the demolished shrine was marked by the local population with a fence, and the location of the Holy Table was covered with a canopy.

In 1900, a chapel was erected on the site, which the surrounding population visited. In 1961, the renewal of Slanci Monastery began under Serbian Patriarch German (Đorić). Construction of the monastery church was completed in 1971, and work continued on the residential quarters (konak) and estate, which remain ongoing.

== Monastery today ==
Today, the monastery is a men's monastery. Slanci Monastery plays an important role in the life of the Serbian Church, as its brotherhood serves to prepare monks who will later join the brotherhood of Hilandar Monastery. The monastery land, designated as an archaeological site of exceptional importance, contains remains of material culture related to its history. The abbot of the monastery until 2020 was Andrej Jovičić.

== See also ==
- List of Serbian Orthodox monasteries
- List of archaeological sites in Serbia

== Sources ==
- "Археолошко налазиште Манастир Сланци". Завод за заштиту споменика културе града Београда (in Serbian).
- "Манастир Сланци". Републички завод за заштиту споменика културе (in Serbian).
- "Манастир Сланци" (PDF). Годишњак града Београда (in Serbian). 1990.
- "Манастир у Сланцима: Трпеза за све гладне". Новости (in Serbian). 2011.
- "Манастир Сланци – о добротворним и мисионарским делатностима". РТС (in Serbian). 2025.
- "Манастир Сланци". Храм Светог Саве (in Serbian).
- "Уснуо у Господу архимандрит Андреј, игуман Сланаца". Српска православна црква (in Serbian). 5 August 2020.
