= Slanci =

Slanci Сланци
- Suburban neighbourhood
- Location within Belgrade
- Coordinates: 44.808451°N 20.571518°E
- Country: Serbia
- Region: Belgrade
- Municipality: Palilula

Area
  - Total: 10.70 km^{2} (4.13 sq mi)

Population (2011)
  - Total: 1,782
  - Density: 166.5/km^{2} (431.3/sq mi)
- Time zone: UTC+1 (CET)
  - Summer (DST): UTC+2 (CEST)
- Postal code: 11215
- Area code: +381(0)11
- Car plates: BG

Slanci (Serbian Cyrillic: Сланци) is a suburban settlement of Belgrade, Serbia. It is located in the Belgrade's municipality of Palilula.

== Location ==
Slanci is located in the eastern section of the Palilula municipality, 10 km (6.2 mi) from downtown Belgrade and few kilometers east of the neighborhood of Višnjica on the road of Slanački put (Slanci road) which connects Belgrade with Veliko Selo, the easternmost settlement in the municipality of Palilula.

The settlement is built on the southern slopes of the hill of Milićevo brdo (279 m), in the micro-valley of the short creek of Vrelski potok. It is surrounded by the Pajstovica, Osovlje and Tapino hills, being tucked in on the southern side of the Danube ridge.

== Population ==
Historical population
Year	Pop.	±%
1948	1,452	—
1953	1,520	+4.7%
1961	1,578	+3.8%
1971	1,685	+6.8%
1981	1,681	−0.2%
1991	1,736	+3.3%
2002	1,770	+2.0%
2011	1,783	+0.7%

Population of Slanci is stagnating for decades: it had a population of 1,736 in 1991, 1,770 in 2002 and 1,783 in 1991. Serbs made 98% of the population according to the 2002 census.

== Characteristics ==
The name of the settlement, which means "salty" in Serbian, comes from the many springs in the hills above, many of which have mildly salty water. Using the natural inclination, villagers built a water supply system in the 19th century, when many towns in Serbia had no waterworks. Due to the lack of maintenance, the old aqueduct collapsed in the late 1990s.

In the expansion of the population of jackals in the outskirts of Belgrade since the 2000s, the jackals have been reported in Slanci in the early 2022.

== Monastery ==
A monastery of Slanci, dedicated to the Saint archdeacon Stefan, is located nearby. Original building was built in the late 13th century by King Dragutin after he received Belgrade and the northern Serbia from the Hungarian king. The monastery was originally dedicated to Mother of God. The area became part of the Serbian state again in 1403, during the rule of Stefan Lazarević who supported the monastery financially. During the reign of his successor, Đurađ Branković, the monastery was dedicated to the Saint Stephen, the saint protector of the Branković dynasty. The prosperity of the monastery was disrupted after the Ottoman conquest of Serbia in 1459. Ottomans killed 30 students in the monastery but the relics were partially moved to the Vojlovica monastery in then Hungary, across the Danube. In the next five centuries, the monastery was demolished and rebuilt several times. In 1900 a chapel was built on the location of the former monastery. In 1960 patriarch German set the foundation stone for the new monastery which was consecrated in 1967, together with the adjoining konak. The monastery church was finished in 1970. In the vicinity of the monastery is the water spring named after Saint Sava. Since the mid-1970s, the monastery is a metochion of the Hilandar monastery on the Mount Athos. Hilandar bestowed to Slanci a copy of its famed icon of Bogorodica Trojeručica, made in Karyes. The monastery is protected both as the cultural monument and as an archaeological site.

== Economy ==
The settlement is officially classified as rural (village), as agriculture dominate its economy. As a typical representative of an urban agriculture, Slanci was previously known for the production of vegetables for the Balgrade markets. Although there are still some hoop houses, since the late 1990s the production is mostly fruit oriented: cherries, apricots, apples.

In recent years, some industrial facilities (warehouses and concrete plants) are developing between Belgrade (Lešće) and Slanci, along the Slanci road.
