= Rospi Ćuprija =

Coordinates: 44°49′N 20°32′E

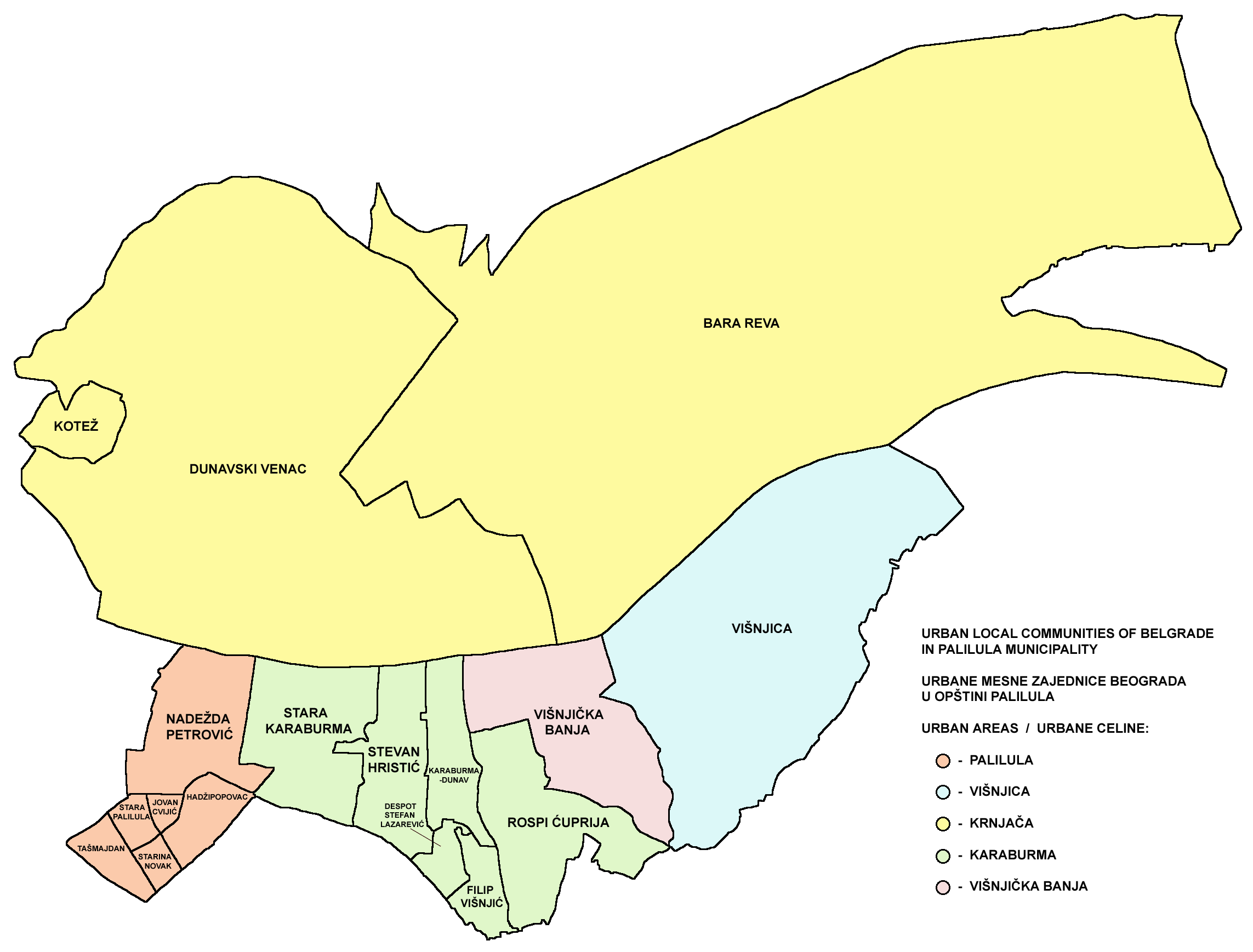
Map of Urban local communities of Belgrade in Palilula municipality

Rospi Ćuprija (Serbian Cyrillic: Роспи Ћуприја) is an urban neighborhood of Belgrade, the capital of Serbia. It is located in Belgrade's municipality of Palilula. The name comes from Ottoman Turkish (o)rospı(lı) köprü 'bridge of whores' because the high-ranking Turkish officer's harem women suspected of disloyalty (marital or otherwise) were murdered on the banks of the river.

== Location ==
Rospi Ćuprija is located on the western bank of the Mirijevski potok stream and the right bank of the Danube's arm of Rukavac which separates it from the former island (now a peninsula) of Ada Huja. It occupies the western section of the Field of Višnjica and borders the neighborhoods of Karaburma on the west (Mirijevo Boulevard), Ćalije on the south and Višnjička Banja on the east (the road of Slanački put).

== History ==
=== Antiquity ===
The oldest settlement known by name on the territory of modern Belgrade was found near the Rospi Ćuprija. Remains of the Celtic (and later Roman) settlement of Singidunum were found near Rospi Ćuprija and neighboring Karaburma, including necropolis rich in artefacts and parts of dunum, fortress. These remains represent a limited archaeological evidence as there were almost no traces left of the Celtic town, except for them. The necropolises contained valuable artistic artifacts which belonged to the warriors of the Scordisci tribe. An apparent Celtic cultural influences have been woven into the spiritual culture of the Singidunum inhabitants, and later mixed with Roman classical cultural elements.

Though it is today generally considered that the old Celtic fortress was located where the modern Belgrade Fortress is, it can't be confirmed as there are no records of where the Celts settled. Some historians suggested that it was rather close to the necropolises in Karaburma and Rospi Ćuprija. Celtic settlements belonged to the La Tène culture.

In the area bounded by the modern Karaburma, Rospi Ćuprija and, at that time island, Ada Huja, Romans cultivated grapevines and used thermal springs for public bathhouses.

== Characteristics ==
With an elevation of only 66 meters above the sea level, Rospi Ćuprija is the lowest point of the city of Belgrade proper.

Rospi Ćuprija is a partially residential area, but is best known for the series of brickworks that occupy extensive areas of the northern ridge of the Field of Višnjica (Polet, Trudbenik, Jedinstvo, Kozara, Balkan, Rekord). It had a population of 4,661 in 2002.
