= Ćalije =

Ćalije Ћалије
- Urban neighbourhood
- Location within Belgrade
- Coordinates: 44°48′18″N 20°31′04″E
- Country: Serbia
- Region: Belgrade
- Municipality: Palilula
- Time zone: UTC+1 (CET)
  - Summer (DST): UTC+2 (CEST)
- Area code: +381(0)11
- Car plates: BG

Ćalije (Serbian Cyrillic: Ћалије) is an urban neighborhood of Belgrade, the capital of Serbia. It is located in Belgrade's municipality of Palilula.

Ćalije is the southernmost neighborhood in the municipality, located in the western part of the field Višnjičko polje, stretching along the Mirijevski Bulevar on both sides of the Mirijevski potok stream. It borders the neighborhoods of Karaburma and Rospi Ćuprija to the north, Zvezdara to the west and Mirijevo to the south.

It is mostly a residential area with a population of 6,323 in 2002. The name is derived from Turkish word çali, meaning bush, shrub.
