= Veliko Selo (Palilula) =

Veliko Selo Велико Село
- Suburban neighbourhood
- Etymology: Big village
- Location within Belgrade
- Coordinates: 44°48′39″N 20°36′5″E
- Country: Serbia
- Region: Belgrade
- Municipality: Palilula

Area
  - Total: 11.90 km^{2} (4.59 sq mi)

Population (2011)
  - Total: 1,594
  - Density: 133.9/km^{2} (346.9/sq mi)
- Time zone: UTC+1 (CET)
  - Summer (DST): UTC+2 (CEST)
- Area code: +381(0)11
- Car plates: BG

Veliko Selo (Serbian Cyrillic: Велико Село) is a suburban settlement of Belgrade, Serbia. It is located in the Belgrade's municipality of Palilula.

== Location ==
Veliko Selo is located in the southern, Šumadija section of the municipality, 12 kilometers east of downtown Belgrade. As the easternmost settlement in the municipality of Palilula it is the ending point of the Slanački put (Slanci road) which connects it with Belgrade. The settlement is built on the southern slopes of the hill of Milićevo brdo (279 m), in the micro-valley of the short creek of Vrelski potok. In Serbian, its name means big village.

== Population ==
Veliko Selo is depopulating: 1,767 inhabitants by the 1991 Census and 1,676 by the 2002 Census. Ethnic structure (2002 Census): Serbs 96,66%, Romani 0,77%.

== History ==
At the end of the 18th century, forces consisting of 16,000 Serbs commanded by Stanko Arambašić from Veliko Selo were the nucleus of Serb forces that defended Belgrade against Janissary forces at the end of November 1797.

With the expansion of the population of jackals in the outskirts of Belgrade since the 2000s, the animals were reported in Veliko Selo in the early 2022.

== Economy ==
The settlement is officially classified as a rural (village) as the economy is entirely agricultural. East and north of the settlement extensive fields and hoop houses produce fruits and especially vegetables for the population of Belgrade: lettuce, onions, cabbage and zucchini.

Agricultural lands are very often flooded by the Danube (about 2 kilometers away from Veliko Selo) as there is no defense from the floods on this section of the river's right bank. This area is called Velikoselski Rit (the Veliko Selo marsh) and by the general urbanistic plan for the development of Belgrade by the year 2021, it is projected as the future new city port, but so far nothing has been done in this direction.

=== Water treatment facility ===
By 2019, Belgrade remained the only larger city on the Danube without the sewage treatment plant. Yearly, 400,000,000 m^{3} (1.4×10^{10} cu ft) of sewage is directly poured in two rivers of Belgrade, the Sava and the Danube. In May 2019, city administration decided to build the facility in Veliko Selo. The central part of the system will be the main interceptor sewer, which would collect the sewage from almost the entire urban section of the city: old section between the Sava and the Danube, Kumodraž, Mali Mokri Lug, left bank of the Sava, New Belgrade and Zemun up to the industrial zone in the Batajnica direction. The facility will be located at the extreme downstream position of the entire system, in the Velikoselski Rit. The complex, which would include its own power generator, will cover an area of 98 ha (240 acres).

Though four additional treatment facilities were planned in the city (Krnjača, Batajnica, Ostružnica and Vinča), this one will be the largest, treating 80% of the city sewage. Construction of the main interceptor which is to conduct sewage to Veliko Selo began in the mid-1980s. Some partial work has been done, but the works halted completely until 2004 when the construction of the 7 km (4.3 mi) long Višnjica tunnel, which connects the neighborhood of Karaburma and Veliko Selo was continued and ultimately finished in 2012. Still, as of 2019, only half of the interceptor network has been built, so the construction of the treatment facility is constantly being postponed. In January 2023, the Ministry of Construction, Transportation and Infrastructure announced launching of the works for some time in 2023.
