= Port of Belgrade =

Port of Belgrade Лука Београд Luka Beograd
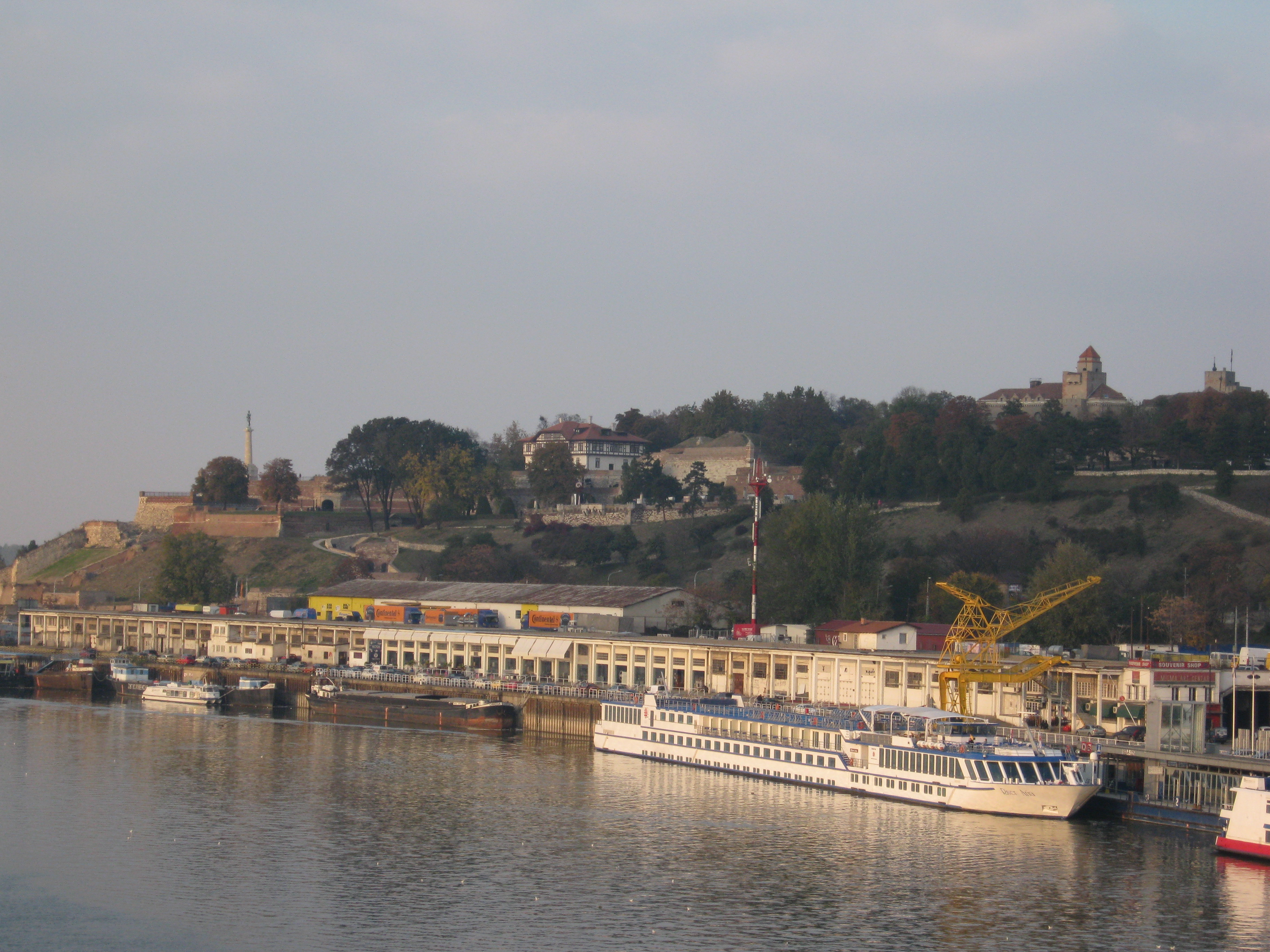
- Port of Belgrade with Belgrade Fortress in the background

Location
- Country: Serbia
- Location: Belgrade
- Coordinates: 44°49′31″N 20°28′41″E

Details
- Opened: 1961; 64 years ago
- Owned by: Wordfin (93.64%); Others (Partial court dispute)
- Type of harbour: Artificial
- Employees: 195 (2018)
- CEO: Milan Beko
- Warehouse space: 950,000 square feet (88,000 m^{2})

Statistics
- Annual cargo tonnage: 4,594,345 (2023)
- Annual revenue: ▼€8.68 million (2018)
- Net income: ▲ (€3.09 million) (2018)
- Website www.lukabeograd.com

The Port of Belgrade (Serbian: Лука Београд, romanized: Luka Beograd) is a cargo and passenger port located on the Danube river in Belgrade, Serbia. The port is located in the center of Belgrade, near Pančevo Bridge. It also manages the passenger terminal on the nearby Sava river. The port transfer capacity is three million tons per year and 10,000 TEUs. It also has 300,000 square meters of warehouses and 650,000 square meters of open-air storage areas. The most common load goods are salt, sugar, concrete iron, paper, pipes and artificial fertilizers

The port was privatized in 2005, in a process which raised issues of corruption which have not yet been settled.

== History ==
The new city port was envisioned on its present location already in 1923 when the Belgrade's first general urban plan was drafted. Though majority of the propositions were accepted by the Ministry of Construction, and the plan was adopted in 1924, it took decades before the port was actually built.

The port has operated since 1961. In 2005, a Luxemburg-based company "Worldfin" owned by Delta Holding and Milan Beko, bought the Port of Belgrade from the City of Belgrade for a sum of 40 million euros. The transaction was in later years annulled and since then it is the subject of judicial process between "Worldfin" and state authorities.

As of 2018, the Port of Belgrade is the most developed port in Serbia. The most common load goods are salt, sugar, concrete iron, paper, pipes and artificial fertilizers. As of 2023, the port has an annual cargo tonnage of 4.594 million tones, making it the busiest port in Serbia.

== Gallery ==
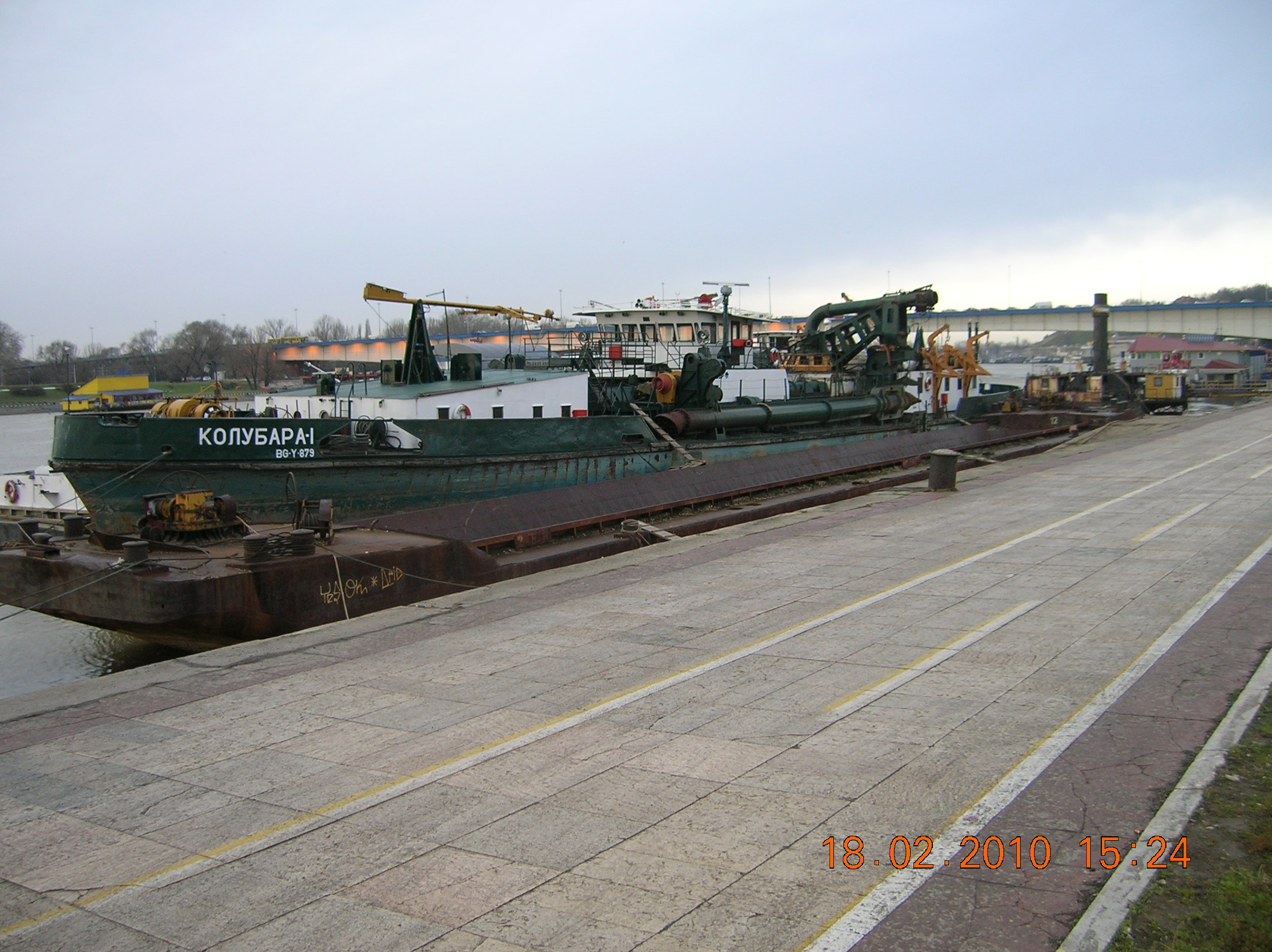
Cargo ship docked in port

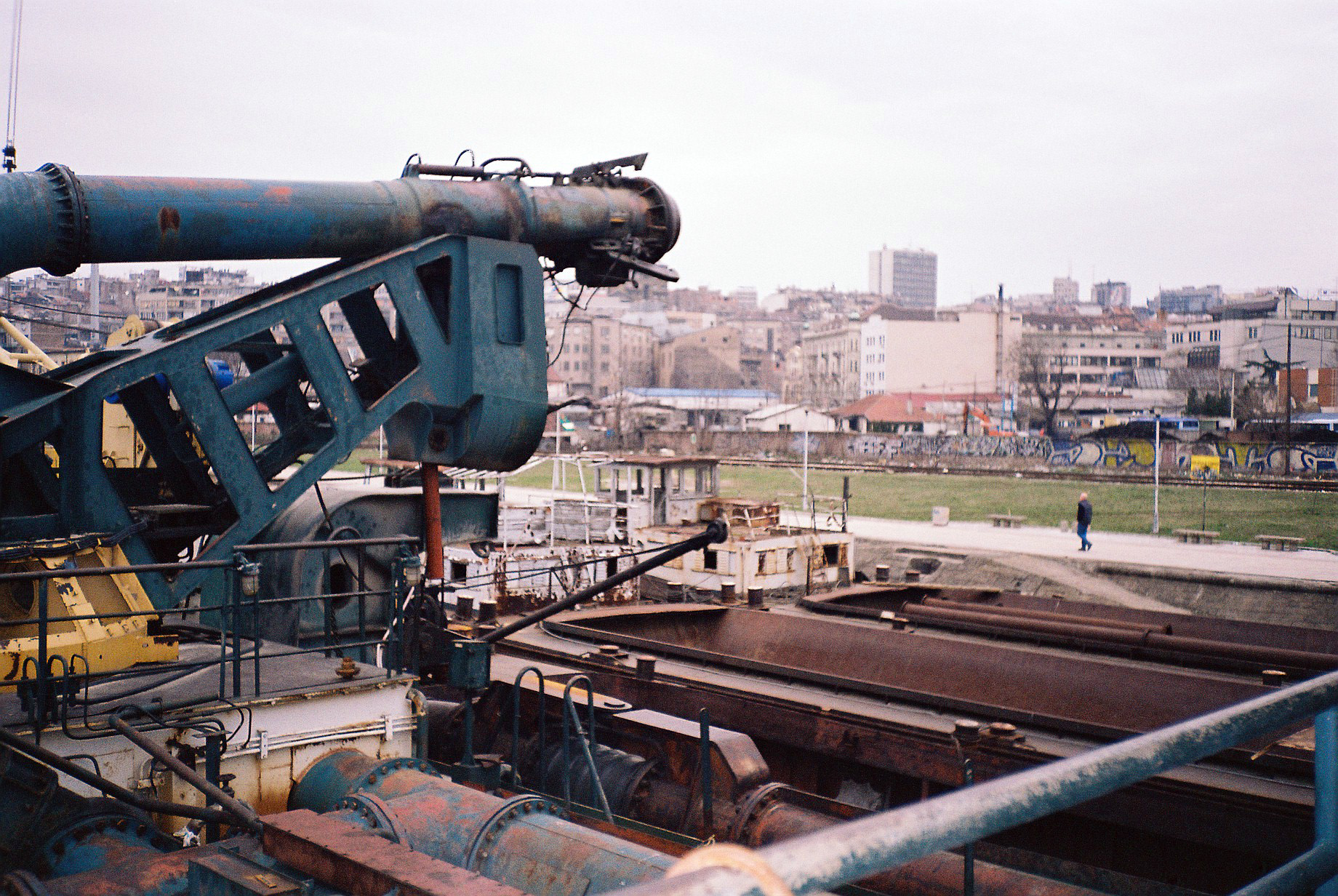
Docked cargo ships

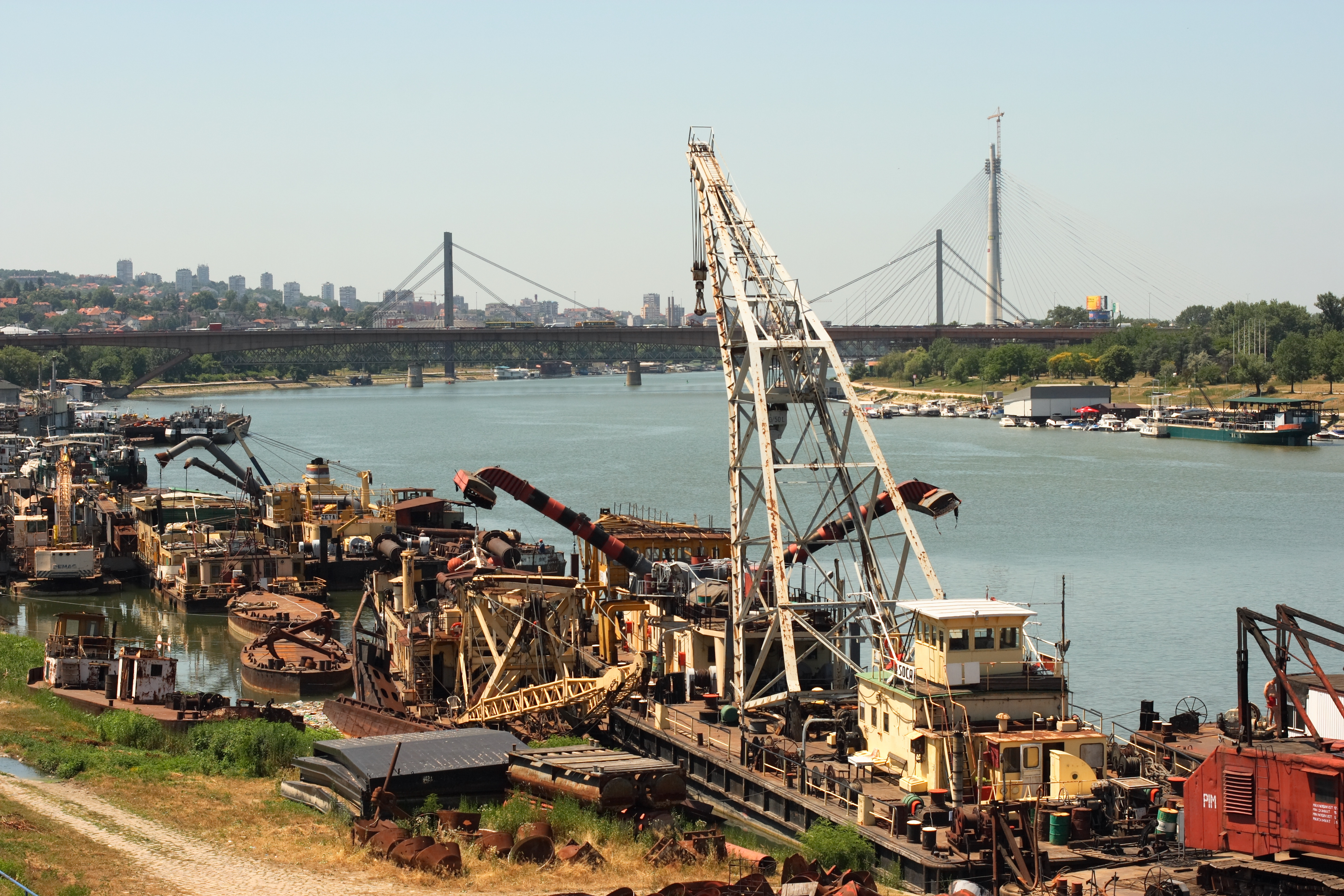
Riverboats docked in port

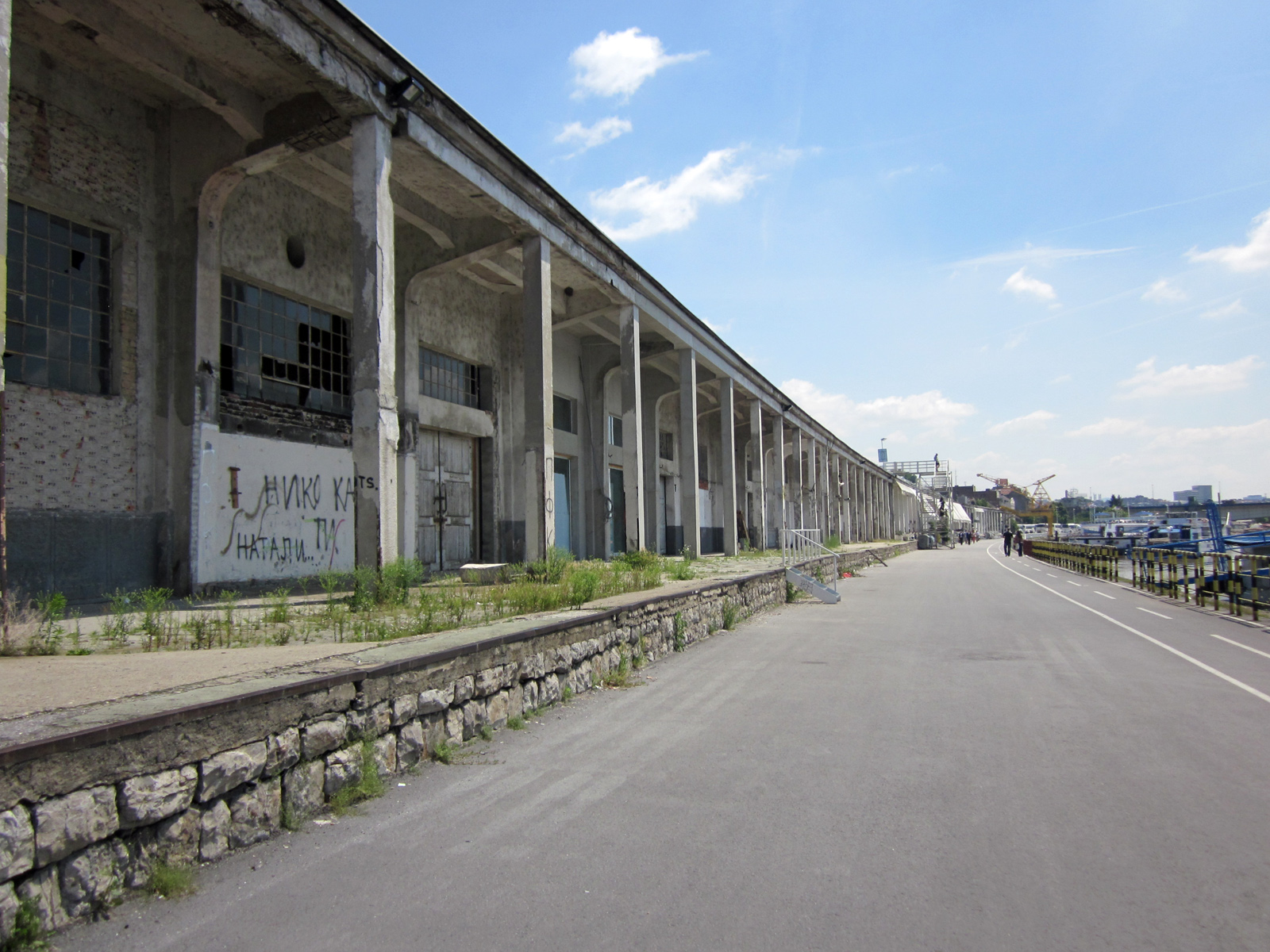
Old Port Buildings

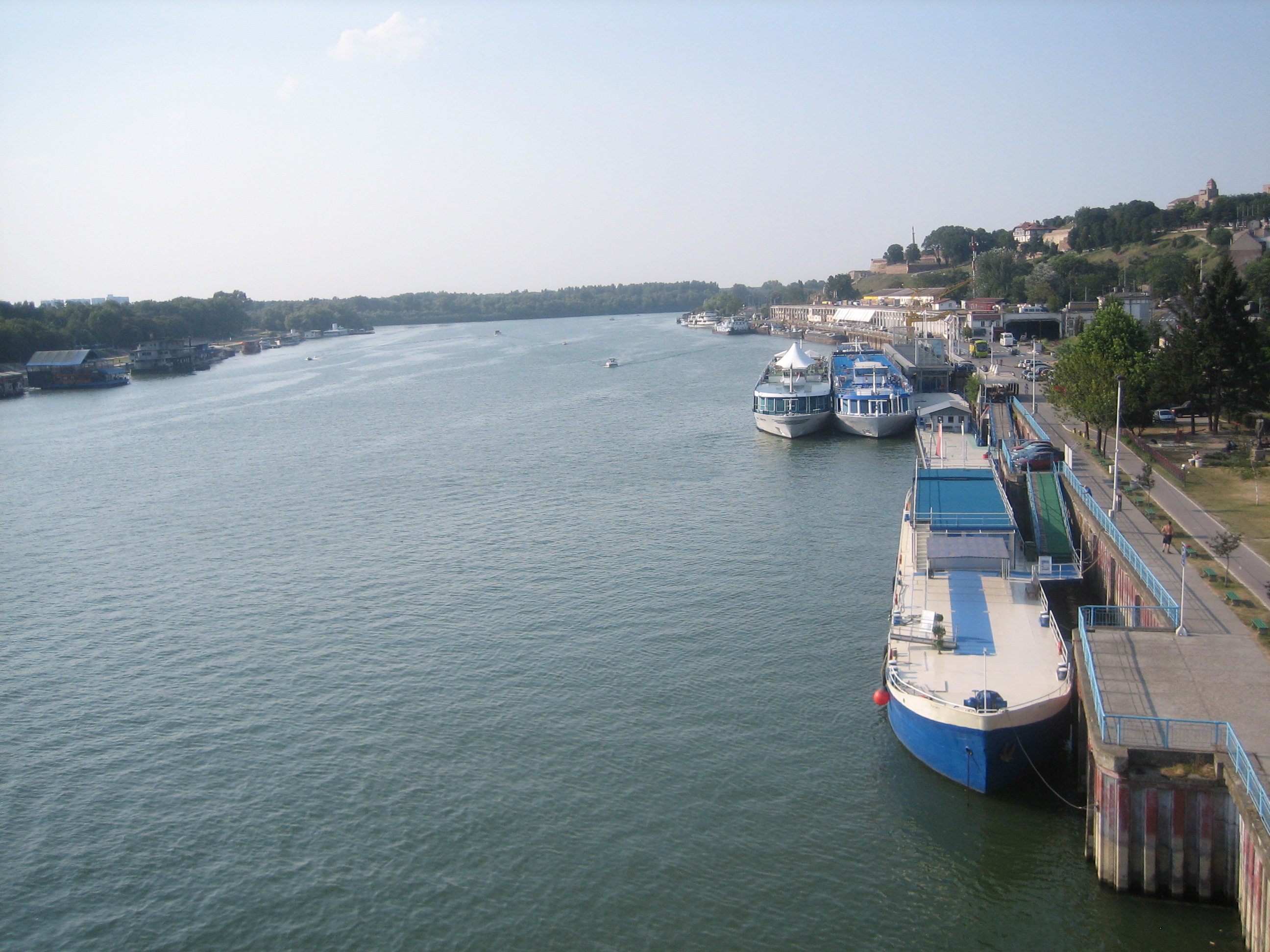
Passenger ships docked in port

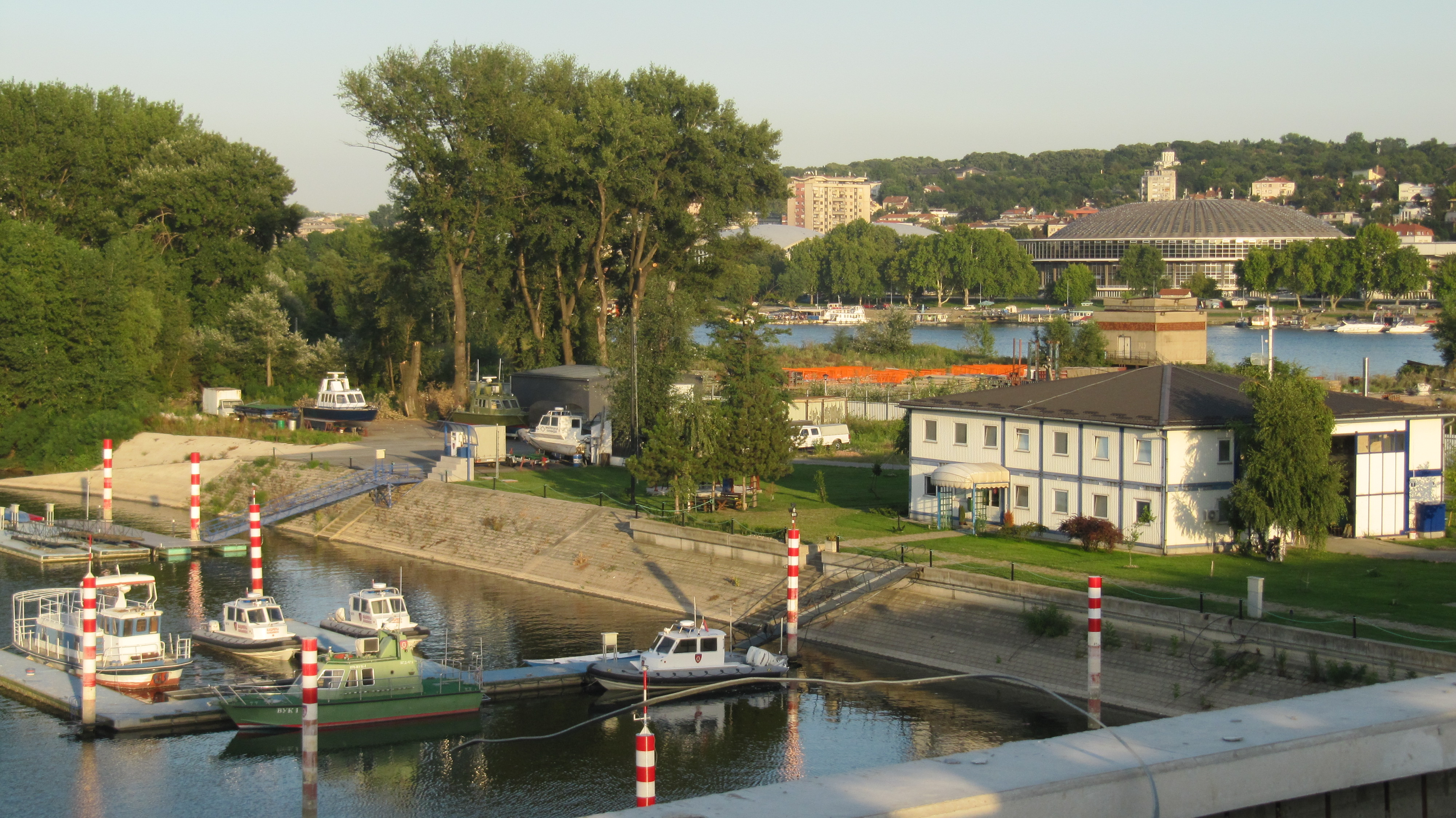
Base of the Police River Diving Center

== See also ==
- Transport in Belgrade
