= Karaburma =

Karaburma Карабурма
- Urban settlement
- Location of Karaburma within Belgrade
- Coordinates: 44°49′N 20°30′E
- Country: Serbia
- Region: Belgrade
- Municipality: Palilula

Area
  - Total: 7.16 km^{2} (2.76 sq mi)

Population (2002 census)
  - Total: 55,343
  - Density: 7,730/km^{2} (20,000/sq mi)
- Time zone: UTC+1 (CET)
  - Summer (DST): UTC+2 (CEST)
- Area code: +381(0)11
- Car plates: BG

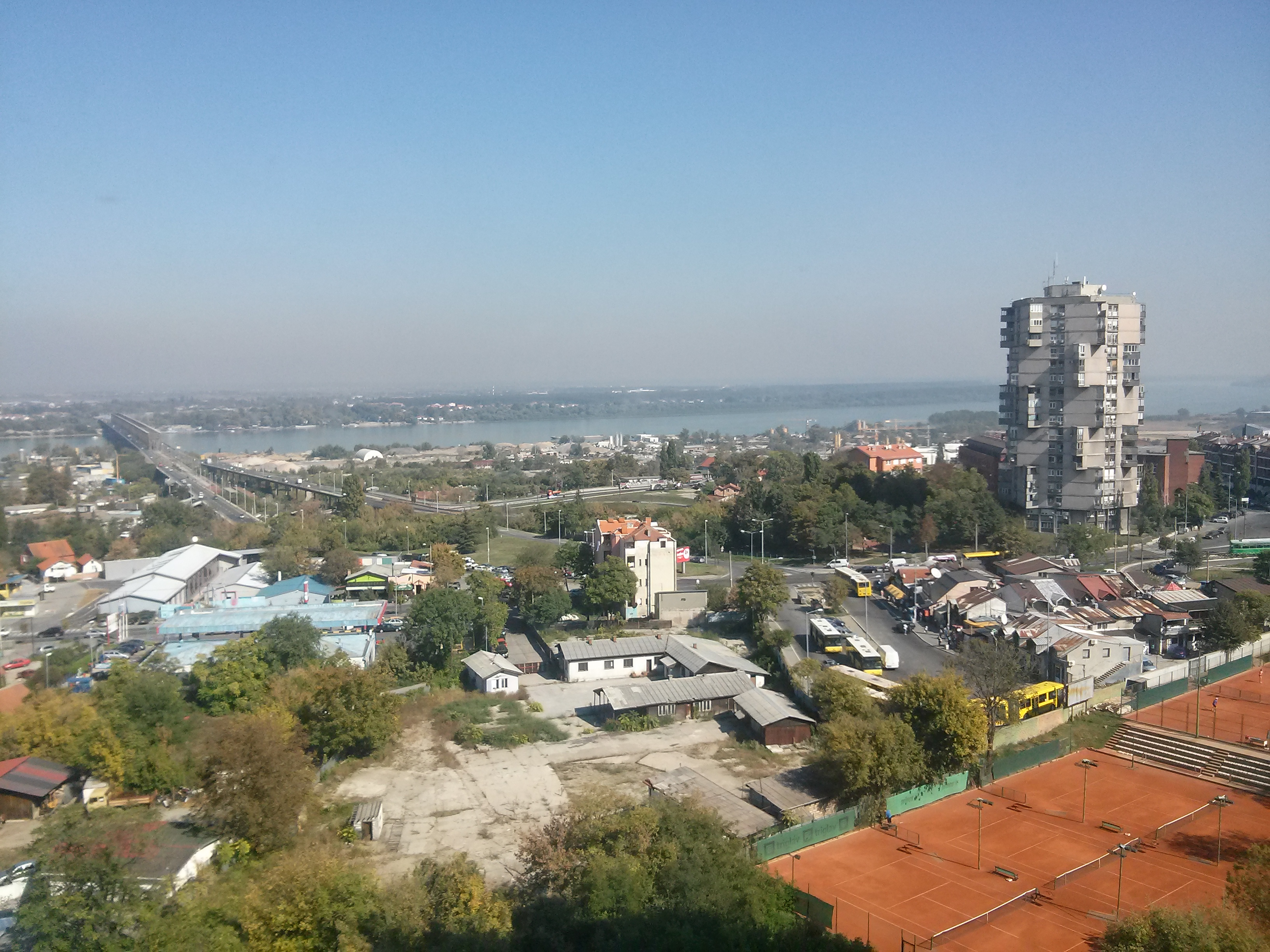
Karaburma

Karaburma (Serbian Cyrillic: Карабурма) is an urban neighborhood of the municipality of Palilula, Belgrade, Serbia. As of 2002, it has a population of 55,343 inhabitants.

== Name ==
The name, Karaburma, is Turkish for black ring which is supposed to mean that the area was forbidden, that is, it should be avoided by people. However, this may be an example of folk etymology as the old Ottoman and Austrian maps name the area Kajaburun (Kaya-burun) which is Turkish for rocky headland.

Chronicler Milan Milićević confirms this, using also the name Kajaburma as the mid-variant of the name, referring to Karaburma as the "nose" of the hill which descends into the Danube.

== Geography ==
Karaburma is geographically a headland peaking into the Danube. It is on the ending section ("nose" or "point") of the Great Vračar hill, today called Zvezdara, which descends in slopes where the modern neighborhoods of Karaburma and Ćalije are.

When the neighboring island of Ada Huja was peninsula and connected to the mainland, Karaburma's area on the right bank of Danube also became known as Ada Huja. Karaburma is now a few hundred meters away from the river.

During the expansion of the population of jackals in the outskirts of Belgrade since the 2000s, the animals were reported in Karaburma in the spring of 2022.

== History ==
=== Antiquity ===
The oldest settlement known by name on the territory of modern Belgrade was found in the Karaburma area. Remains of the Celtic (and later Roman) settlement of Singidunum were found near Karaburma and neighboring Rospi Ćuprija, including necropolis (Horseman's grave 16) rich in artifacts and parts of dunum, fortress, so it is believed that the settlement itself was located here. These remains represent a limited archaeological evidence as there were almost no traces left of the Celtic town, except for them. The necropolises contained valuable artistic artifacts which belonged to the warriors of the Scordisci tribe. An apparent Celtic cultural influences have been woven into the spiritual culture of the Singidunum inhabitants, and later mixed with Roman classical cultural elements.

Though it is today generally considered that the old Celtic fortress was located where the modern Belgrade Fortress is, but it can't be confirmed as there are no records of where the Celts settled. Some historians suggested that it was rather close to the necropolises in Karaburma and Rospi Ćuprija. Celtic settlements belonged to the La Tène culture.

In the area bounded by the modern Karaburma, Rospi Ćuprija and, at that time island, Ada Huja, Romans cultivated grapevines and used thermal springs for public bathhouses.

=== Later period ===
For centuries area was a swamp with vast quick clay areas and was avoided by humans ever since the Roman period.Thermal springs along the Danube's bank, that no longer exist, fumed and heated the water so the swamp was in constant mist. In the 19th century Serbian prince Miloš Obrenović ordered that Karaburma will be the official place of death sentences executions (until 1912) which added to the notoriety of the area.

Until Belgrade's expansion after the World War I, Karaburma was sparsely inhabited with small and scattered shanty towns. Today it is a modern neighborhood 10 minutes away from downtown Belgrade with good transportation connections.

Before the joint German-Austro-Hungarian occupation of Serbia in World War I, the Austro-Hungarian army temporarily entered Belgrade, from 3 to 14 December 1914. By 4 December they erected gallows in Karaburma for hanging civilians, as they had in several other locations around the town.

=== Interwar period ===
During the interwar period a string of new neighborhoods encircled eastern outskirts of Belgrade, with names usually containing "suburb" and some member of the royal family. These original names either never became popular or were suppressed after World War II and replaced. The inspiration for the design of the neighborhoods came from the complex built in 1912 along the Daviel Street in Paris. It consisted of 40 one-floor houses with gardens, indented from the main street. This style became very popular across the Europe. Two such suburbs were built on the territory of modern Karaburma, Suburb of King Alexander Karađorđević and Suburb of Prince Paul Karađorđević.

The rapid development of Karaburma during the Interwar Period is link to the development of the textile industry and the business enterprises of the Ilić family, especially Vlada Ilić who was an industrialist and mayor of Belgrade from 1935 to 1939. After acquiring a cloth factory in 1906 in Karaburma, Ilić sequestered a room and adapted it into the school for the children of his workers. He personally paid the teacher's wages. As the factory complex expanded and number of workers grew, the provisional school became too small, so Ilić rented the upper floor of the nearby Lavadinović kafana, still fully financed by him. The local population objected that a school and kafana share a building. Ilić then purchased a lot, some 100 m (330 ft) away and built a proper school while the old one remained in use until 1933. Named elementary school "Cloth Factory Ilić", it was built from his donations in 1923. It has been renamed "Jovan Cvijić" in 1931, a name it still bears today. The school was relocated from the factory premises in 1934 in the new building, built on the land in Old Karaburma donated by the industrialists, brothers Ivković, where it is still located.

During Ilić's tenure as a mayor, the King Peter II Bridge (today the Pančevo Bridge) across the Danube was built and opened on 27 October 1935, right at the western edge of Karaburma. A section of railway origination from the Belgrade Main railway station, which encircled the central ridge of the city along the rivers, continued over to the King Peter II Bridge when it was constructed. Ilić also built apartments in Karaburma for his employees, and even his villa was built on a location close to his factories, in the more westernly neighborhood of Viline Vode. After the war Ilić was imprisoned and his companies nationalized by the new Communist government. Well known post-war Serbian state owned textile companies, like Beteks, Beko and Vunarski kombinat, some of which were located in Karaburma, developed from Ilić's factories.

Another person who worked on development of Karaburma in this period was deputy mayor Viktor Krstić. He conducted the waterworks in the neighborhood, though only for the public service at first, and built 4 drinking fountains in Karaburma in 1932. He also organized the paving of the streets with kaldrma, a type of cobblestone. On one of the fountains, the inhabitants of Karaburma placed a memorial plaque, thanking Krstić for bringing the water in the neighborhood. None of the fountains survive today.

=== Modern period ===
After the economic collapse in the 1990s and bankruptcy of the major industrial companies, Karaburma began to change as the previously heavily industrialized areas began to deteriorate. Since the 2010s, demolition of several derelict industrial complexes began. In April 2017 a new mall was opened on the lot of the former sportswear and sport equipment kombinat "Sport". In October 2018 it was announced that even larger lot of the former "Minel Kotlogradnja" factory will be demolished, and a new residential-commercial complex would be built instead, starting from August 2019. Another mall, Big Fashion Park, was opened in this complex in December 2019.

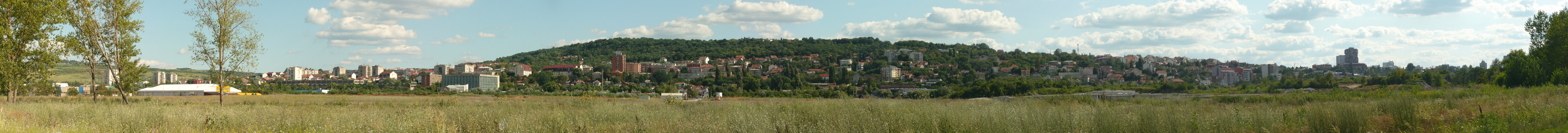
A panorama of the hill, from north

== Location ==
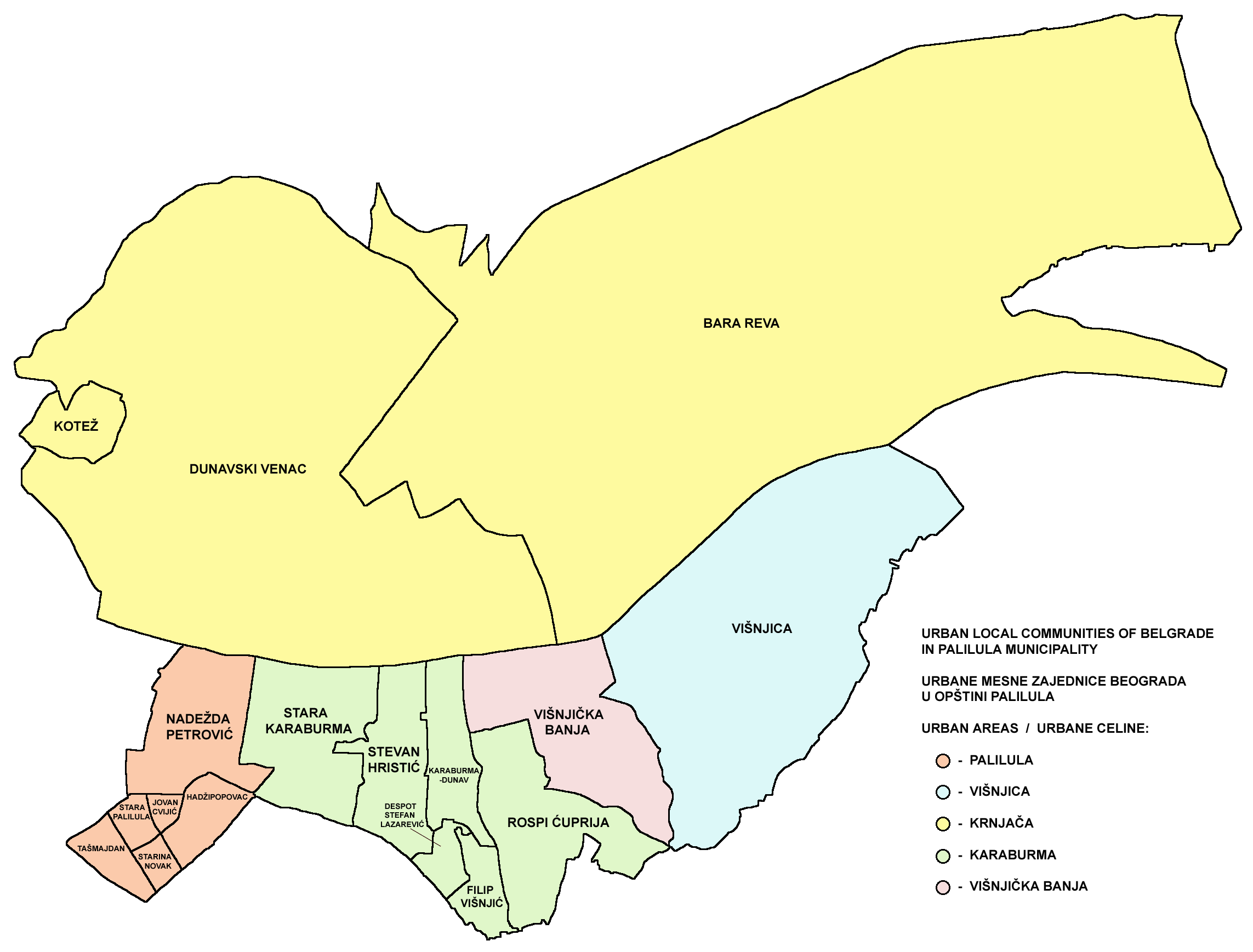
Map of Urban local communities of Belgrade in Palilula municipality

Karaburma is located between the neighborhoods of Zvezdara (south), Bogoslovija (west), Ada Huja (north), Rospi Ćuprija (east) and Ćalije (southeast). Its entire southern border (Dragoslava Srejovića street) is also municipal border between Palilula and Zvezdara, for the most part dividing it from the Zvezdara woods. Northern border is the Višnjička street while the eastern is the Mirijevo Boulevard.

== Administration ==
On 1 September 1955, Karaburma became one of the municipalities of Belgrade, but by 3 January 1957 it was incorporated into the municipality of Palilula.

Today, it roughly consists of several communities: Stara Karaburma (Old Karaburma), the western section, Karaburma-Dunav or Nova Karaburma (Karaburma-Danube or New Karaburma), the eastern section. The south-eastern corner, which extends into Ćalije, is also known as Karaburma II.

== Characteristics ==
Karaburma is a residential area, and one of the most populous neighborhoods of Belgrade, with a population of 34,343. Some of the area's attractions are two green markets and the stadium of OFK Beograd.

Pedestrian square on Marijane Gregoran Street has been adapted into the Park of Serbian-Greek friendship, which covers 0.28 hectares (0.69 acres).

== Sources ==
- Beograd - plan grada; M@gic M@p, 2006; ISBN 86-83501-53-1
- Beograd - plan i vodič; Geokarta, 1999; ISBN 86-459-0006-8
