= Jabučki Rit =

Jabučki Rit Јабучки рит
- suburban settlement
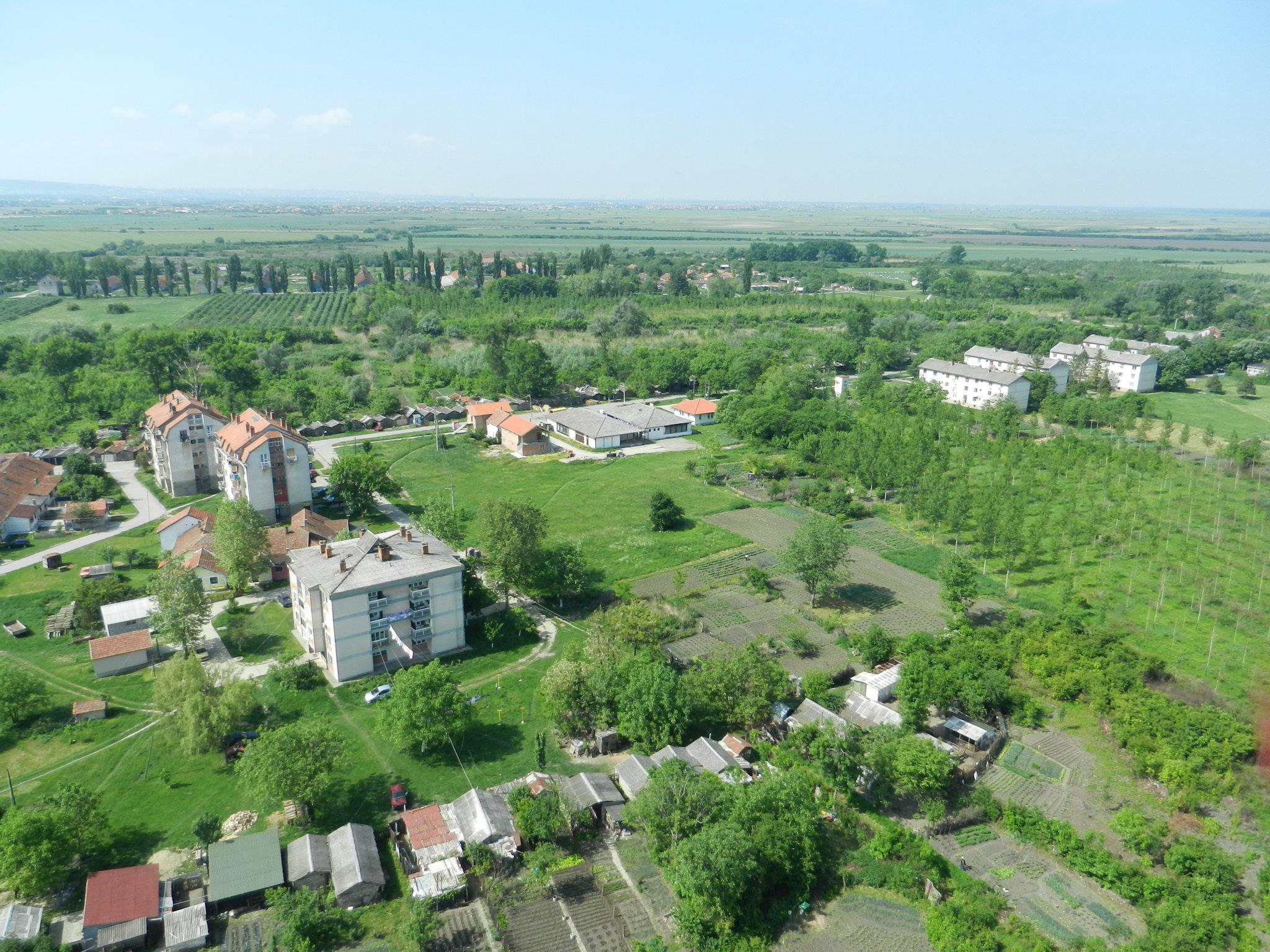
- Aerial photograph of Jabučki Rit
- Interactive map of Jabučki Rit
- Coordinates: 44.9170°N 20.5591°E
- Country: Serbia
- District: City of Belgrade
- Municipality: Palilula
- Settlement: Padinska Skela
- Established: 1948
- Time zone: UTC+1 (CET)
  - Summer (DST): UTC+2 (CEST)

Jabučki Rit (Serbian Cyrillic: Јабучки рит) is a suburban settlement of Belgrade, the capital of Serbia. It is located in the municipality of Palilula. Established in 1948, it existed as a separate settlement until 1955, and again from 1956 to 1972, when it was administrativelly annexed to Padinska Skela.

== Location ==
Jabučki Rit is located in the northern, Banat section of the municipality, 23 km (14 mi) northeast of downtown Belgrade. It lies in the central part of the Pančevački Rit marshland, along a bend of the Sibnica Canal, near its junction with the Botuć Canal. The settlement is not located on any major road. It is connected by a 10 kilometres (6.2 mi) road via Glogonjski Rit to the Zrenjaninski Put road, which links Belgrade with Zrenjanin in Vojvodina.

== History ==
Before World War II, the area of Jabučki Rit was known as Komareva Humka. Although the settlement did not yet exist, the locality was electrified in 1928, two decades before electrification reached the rest of northern Pančevački Rit. The name Komareva Humka is preserved in the official name of the cadastral municipality, which is much larger than Jabučki Rit itself, covers 72.4 km^{2} (28.0 sq mi), and includes Glogonjski Rit.

Jabučki Rit was one of several new settlements established in Pančevački Rit, beginning in 1948, alongside Besni Fok (in 1947), Padinska Skela, Crvenka, Dunavac, Glogonjski Rit, Kovilovo, Preliv, Tovilište and Vrbovski. These settlements were part of a broader effort to drain the marshland, convert it to arable land, and provide housing for workers of the agricultural PKB Corporation which managed the project. PKB Corporation later grew into a major company with over 42,000 employees. After the economic transition of the 2000s, the company collapsed, and was sold by the government in October 2018 to the United Arab Emirates-based Al Dahra Agricultural Company for roughly half its estimated value. The PKB directorate branch building in Jabučki Rit burned down in a fire on 6 May 2022.

Administratively, Jabučki Rit was originally part of the municipality of Padinska Skela. In 1955 it was abolished as a separate settlement and annexed to Padinska Skela, along with other nearby settlements. In 1956 these settlements were again separated, and the entire Pančevački Rit was incorporated into the municipality of Krnjača, which was itself abolished in 1965 and attached to Palilula. Most of the smaller settlements, including Jabučki Rit, were abolished again in 1972 and annexed to the larger ones. Jabučki Rit was reattached to Padinska Skela, despite being 13 km (8.1 mi) to the east, with no urban continuity between them. It is, in fact, much closer to the Belgrade suburb of Ovča, whose eastern outskirts lie about 3 km (1.9 mi) to the southwest.

The movement advocating the creation of a new Dunavski Venac municipality, essentially a revival of the former Krnjača municipality under a different name, has been one of the most active municipal initiatives in Belgrade. A petition with 17,000 signatures was submitted to the Belgrade City Assembly in 2003, but the assembly concluded that conditions for establishing a new municipality were not met. The movement gained momentum, and in 2005 the Palilula Municipal Assembly initially supported the proposal, but later reversed its decision. According to the statute of the organization promoting the new municipality, Jabučki Rit (along with other peripheral settlements) would again be detached from Padinska Skela. In October 2017, the city administration disclosed that the proposal had been resubmitted, but that it was inconsistent with the City Statute.

== Characteristics ==
The settlement is named after the nearby village of Jabuka in Pančevo, Vojvodina. ‘’Jabučki rit’’ means “Jabuka's marshland”. The area is known among birdwatchers and is recognized as a successful breeding site of the white-tailed eagle.

While it existed as a separate settlement, Jabučki Rit had a population of 799 in 1961 and 885 in 1971.

Jabučki Rit is connected to Belgrade by public bus line 106, which links it to the Omladinski Stadium terminus in the neighborhood of Bogoslovija. The settlement has a kindergarten, a four-year elementary school (a satellite school of the “Olga Petrov” elementary school in Padinska Skela), and a community healthcare center. A small Romani settlement is located in Jabučki Rit, as part of a 2015 city social-housing project.
