= Beljarica =

Wetland in the Danube valley in Belgrade, Serbia

Coordinates: 44.907854°N 20.360797°E

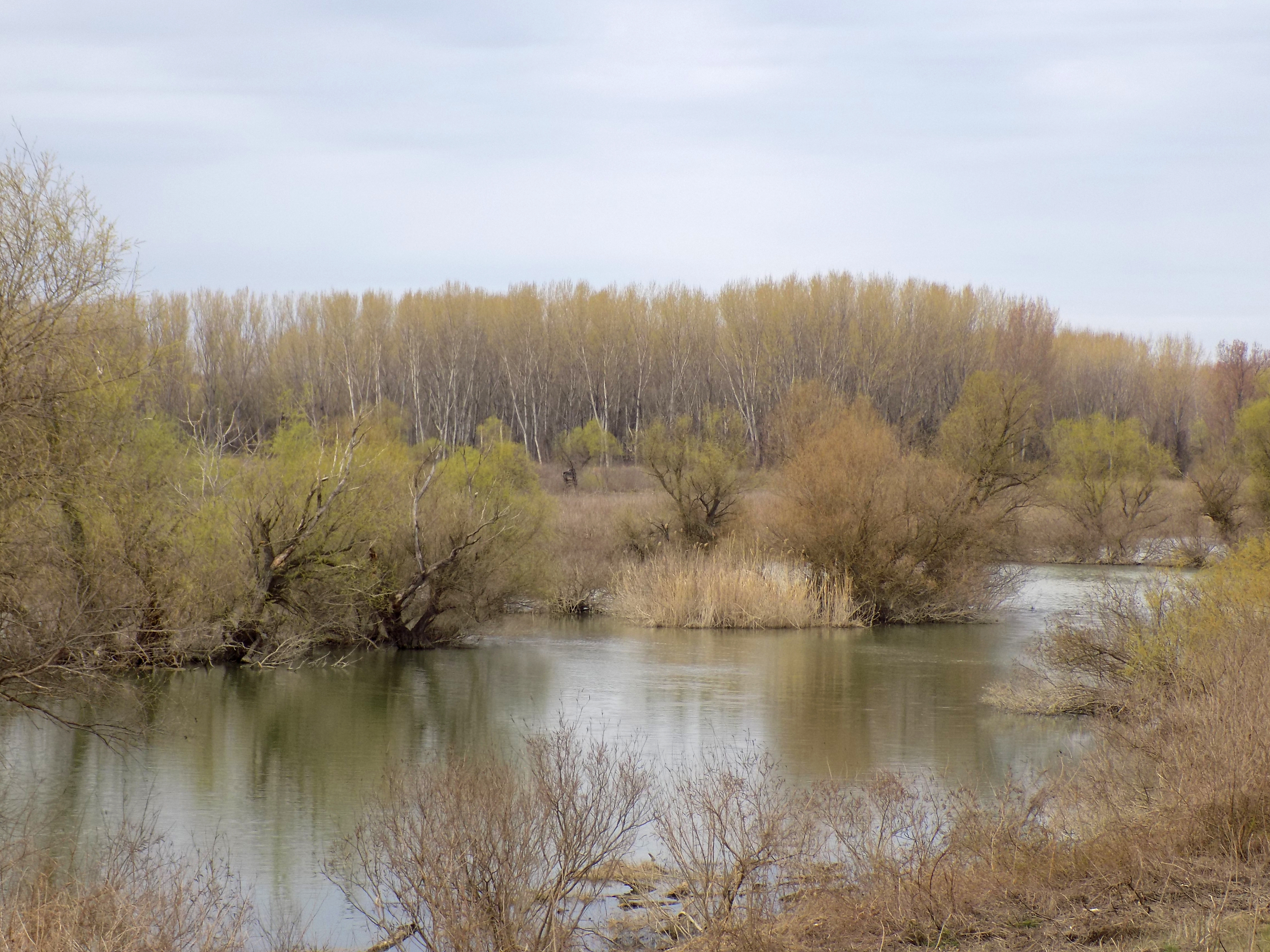
Beljarica wetland

Beljarica (Serbian: Бељарица) is a wetland in the Danube valley in Belgrade, the capital of Serbia. Since 2013, it is in the process of becoming protected area. Due to the abundant wildlife and undisturbed nature, though being close to downtown Belgrade, it has been nicknamed "Belgrade's Amazonia". With Gornje Podunavlje and Kovilj-Petrovaradin Marshes, both of which have already been declared special nature reserves, Beljarica is among the largest flood zones in Serbia.

== Location ==
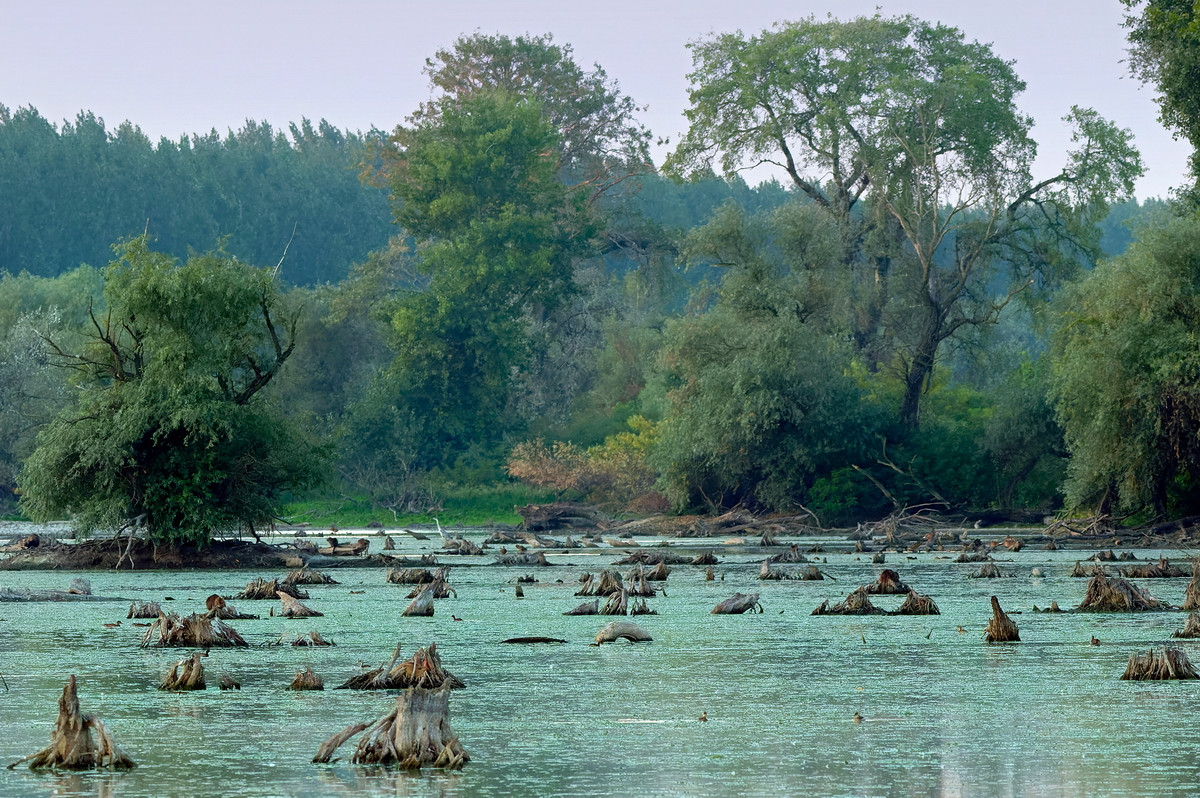

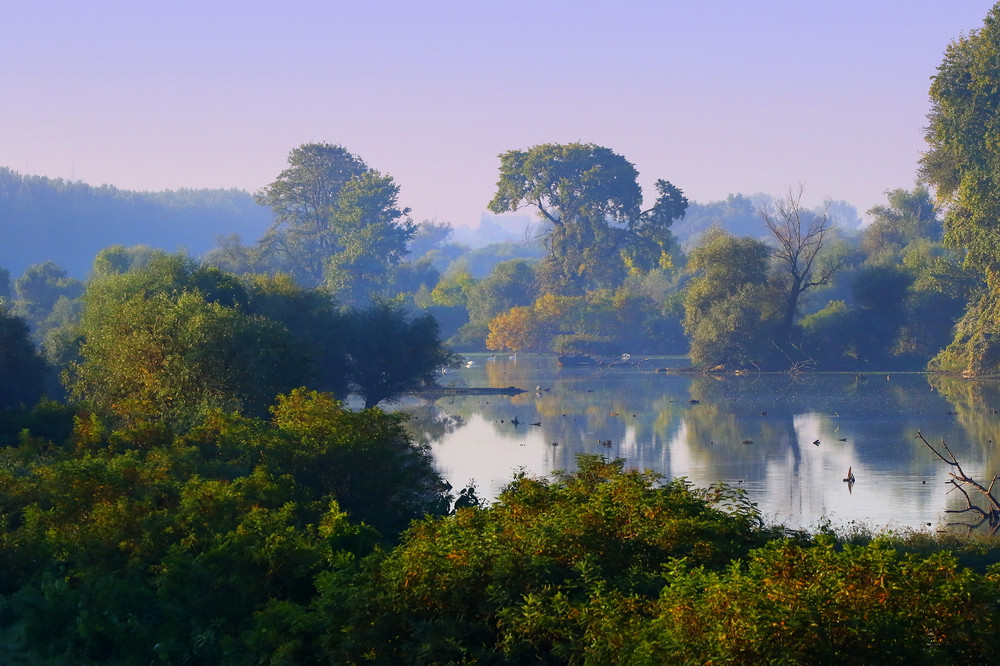

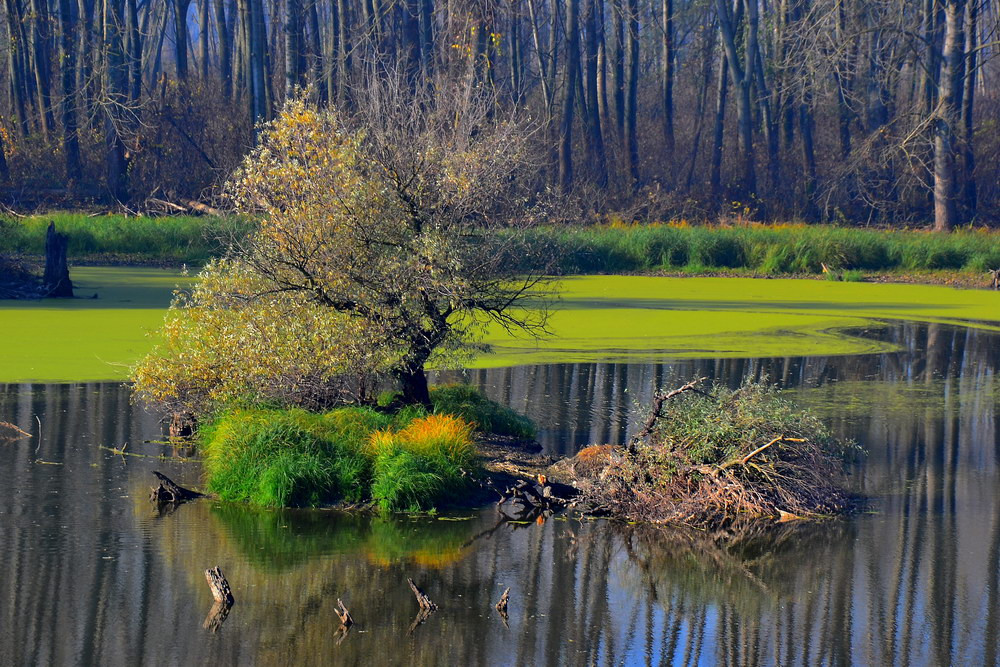

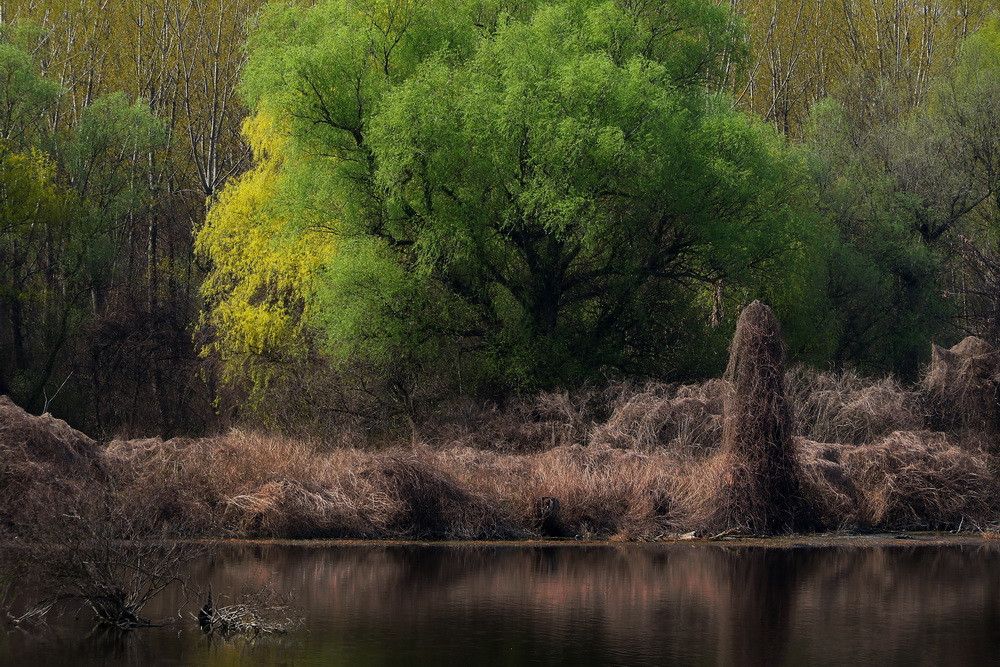

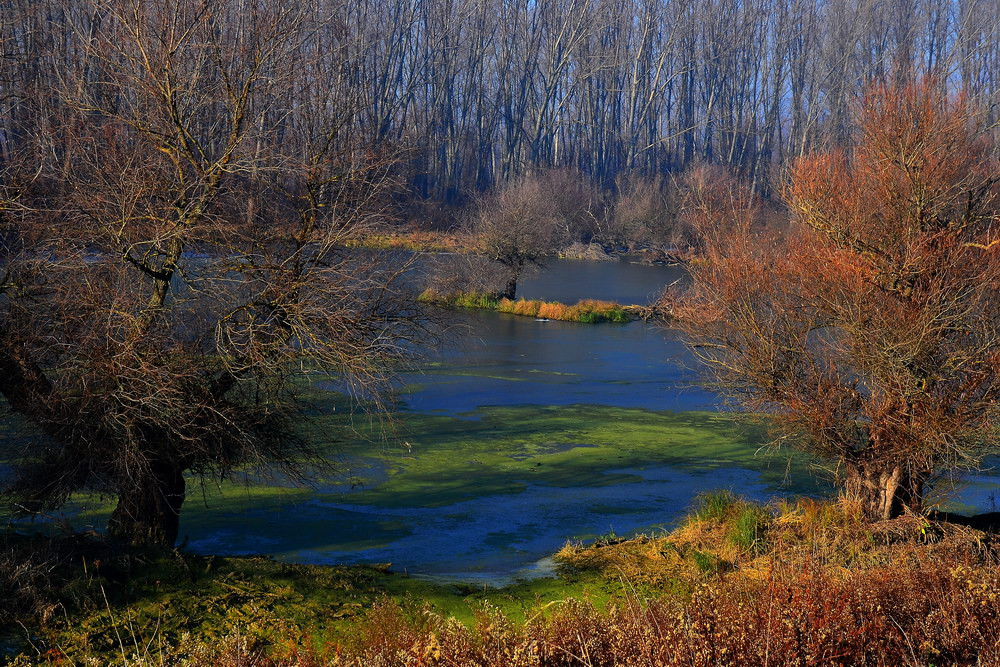

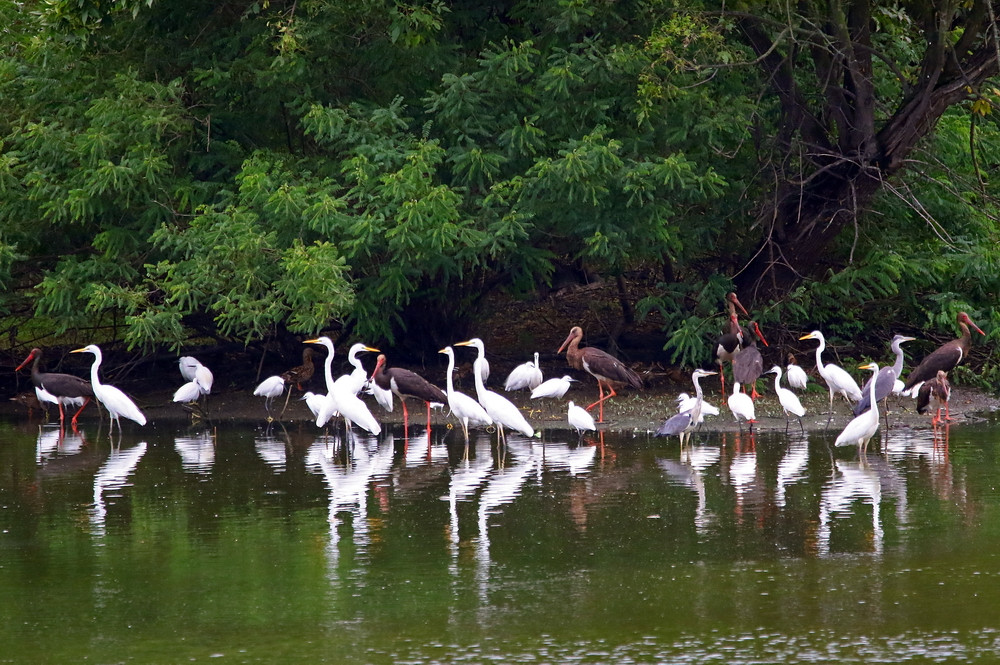

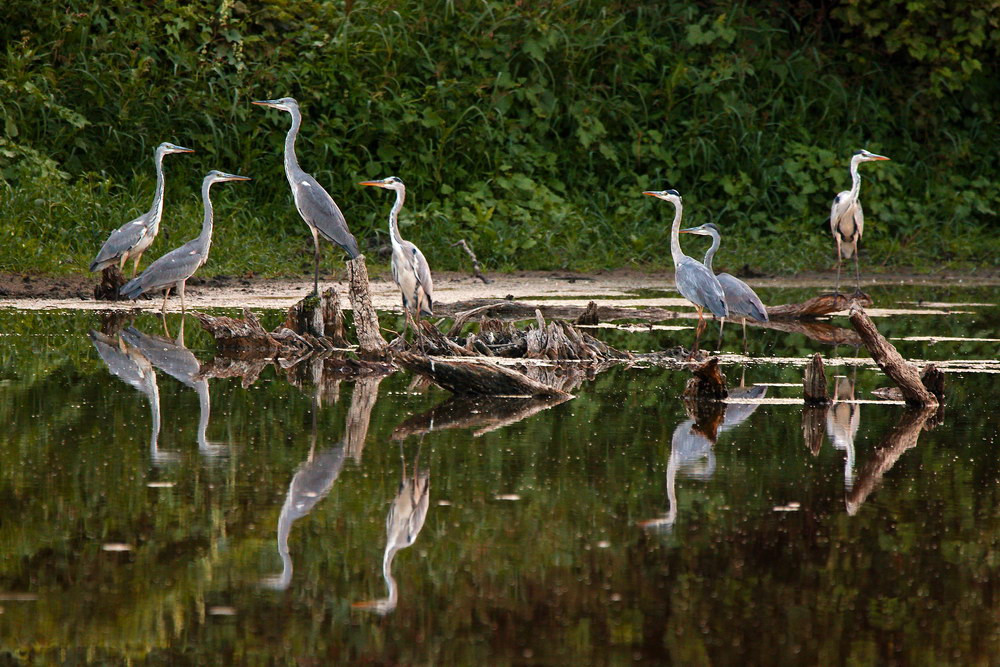

Beljarica is located northwest of Belgrade, in the southwest corner of the Pančevački Rit marshland and, thus, of the Banat region. It begins 15 km (9.3 mi) from downtown and spawns along the left bank of the Danube, approximately from Danube's 1,175 km (730 mi) to 1,190 km (740 mi). It belongs to the municipality of Palilula and, though inhabited, it is administratively divided between the settlements of Borča (southern), Kovilovo (central) and Padinska Skela (northern part).

It begins north of the point where the Pupin Bridge crosses the Danube and stretches across several neighborhoods and settlements on the left, Syrmian bank: Nova Galenika, 13. Maj, Batajnica (in the municipality of Zemun) and Novi Banovci (in the municipality of Stara Pazova).

== Geography ==
Beljarica occupies the marshland between the left bank of the Danube and the curved embankment which protects the drained and arable land in Pančevački Rit and is geographically known as the Pančevači Rit's Cassette). Northern section is known as the bog of Široka Bara. It covers an area of 18.6 km^{2} (7.2 sq mi) and is locally also known as "Crvenka" or "Balaton".

As an elongated floodplain along the Danube, Beljarica is a typical green corridor. The area includes two sizable flood zones, Crvenka (main Beljarica proper) and Kožara. The marshland represents a mosaic of bogs, streams, islands, oxbows, meanders and lush forests and makes a natural riparian zone which receives the surplus of water during the high water level of the Danube, thus preventing the flooding downstream. It is not preventing flooding only of its direct hinterland (some 340 km^{2} (130 sq mi) Pančevački Rit), but also parts of Zemun, New Belgrade and even lowlands upstream the Sava river from its mouth into the Danube.

== Natural life ==
=== Forest ===
The belt between the inner and outer embankments, and the river, is planted with the forest trees. The forest acts as an obstacle for the high waters and strong winds, protecting the inland settlements (Borča, Kovilovo, Padinska Skela). It forms a sanitary and hygienic belt between the river and the human habitats, while the oxygen production is beneficial even for the settlements across the Danube. The most abundant tree species is the poplar. Poplars have been systematically planted and constantly re-planted as after 20 to 25 years they are being cut for the industrial production. The poplar is known for its fast growth and almost sponge-like absorption qualities, but the water is also absorbed by the humus layer which developed in time on the forest floor. The natural forests are typical gallery forests, consisting of willows and poplars. The cultivated trees are hybridized Canadian poplar.

The area is prone to storms. In 2004, a powerful storm destroyed thousands of trees. In September 2017, another storm ravaged 90 ha (220 acres) of forest. In July 2019, Beljarica was hit by a heavy storm. A twister was formed which in only several minutes ripped out several thousand trees on an area of 2 km^{2} (0.77 sq mi). It is estimated that a total of 66,000 m3 of wood was destroyed. The trees destroyed by the storm were planted between 2000 and 2004.

=== Wildlife ===
The wetland is home to 216 plant species, 139 species of insects and 98 species of fish. Beljarica is a major fish spawning and bird nesting area. Of 136 bird species which live in Beljarica, 108 are protected. There are several nesting couples of the largest European eagle, white-tailed eagle, and the black stork also lives in the area. After coming into the public spot, survey of Beljarica increased, so by 2020, a 166 species of birds were reported, of which 137 are protected. Other birds include ferruginous duck, pygmy cormorant, corn crake and Eurasian bittern.

In October 2021, a large number of dead swans was spotted in Beljarica, but also in numerous wetlands all over Belgrade (Zemunski Kej, Vizelj, Kišvara, Jojkićev Dunavac, Čenta, Bela Stena, Ilićev Dunavac). It was detected that the culprit was the bird flu H5N8, which can infect other wild birds and poultry, but is generally not associated with humans.

Mammals in the wetland include otter, wild cat, pine marten and beech marten, but also wild hog, coypu, jackal, badger and hare. There are 62 mammalian species in Beljarica. By August 2021, naturalists began warning on the possible overpopulation of coypus, non-native invasive species which were probably let into the wild when production on fur farms became too costly. They are especially a threat to the population of beavers, which were extinct in Serbia in the early 1900s, but were successfully reintroduced since 2004. Calls were made for the plan on controlling the coypu population. By February 2022, coypus spread into the Sava.

== Protection and human interaction ==
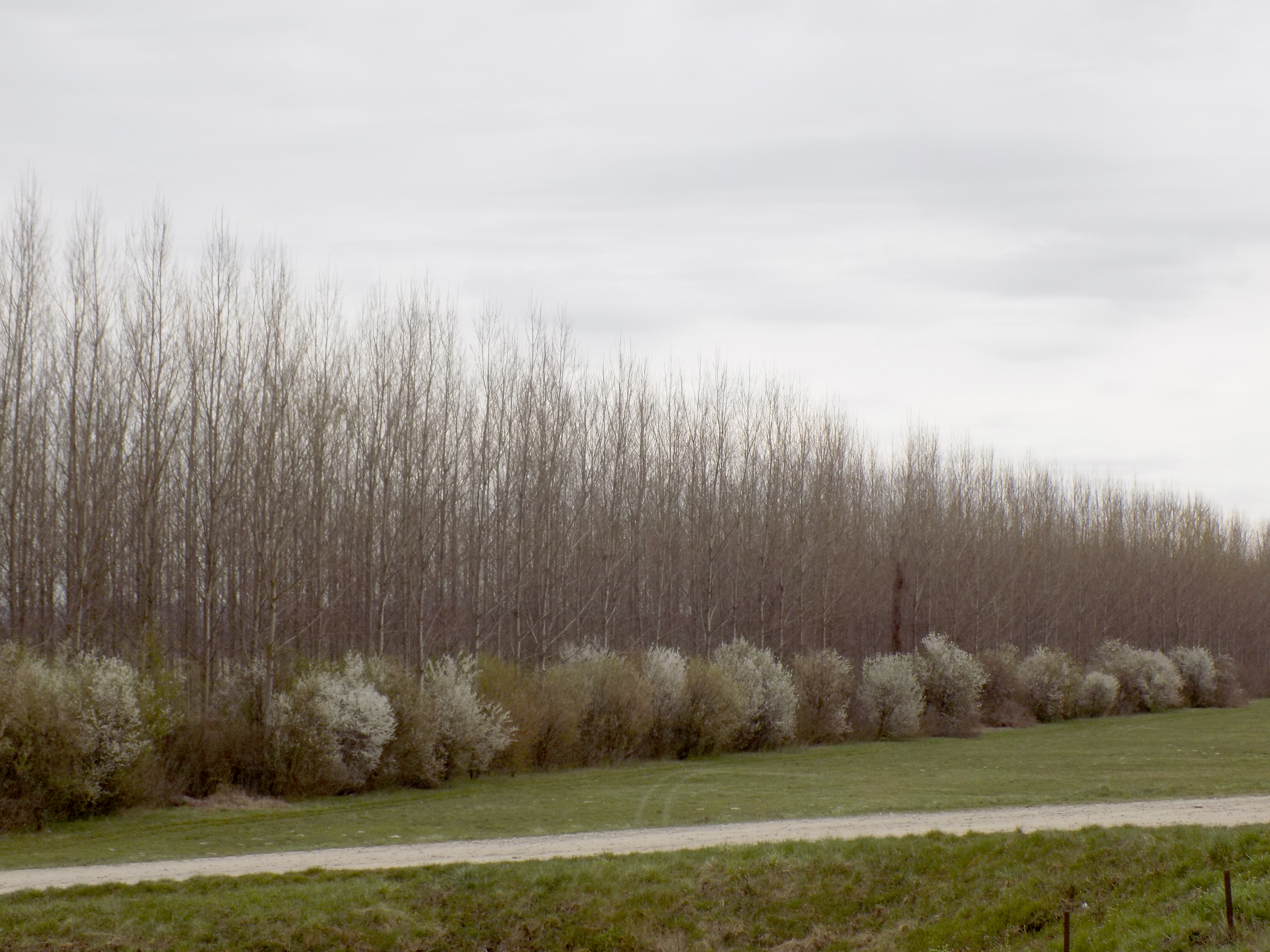
Wind protective forest belt

As Serbia is a signatory of the Berne Convention on the Conservation of European Wildlife and Natural Habitats and the Birds Directive, the state is obliged to protect such an abundant bird habitat. In 2010, the League for the Ornithological Action petitioned for the protection of the area, which was accepted by the City Secretariat for Environment which forwarded it to the Institute for Nature Conversation of Serbia. In 2013 they placed Beljarica in the "process of becoming a protected area", as the nature reserve. That way, Beljarica is considered as being protected until the government decides whether it will declare it a reserve or not. Additionally, with the islands of Great War Island and Little War Island, it constitutes the Important Bird Area of the "Sava's mouth into the Danube".

In 2015, with changed both the local and state government, city assembly was to vote on declaring the reserve of the "Wetland on the Danube's left bank in Belgrade", which was even envisioned as the core of the future "National Park Belgrade" but the motion was withdrawn before the vote. By 2020, Beljarica grew more known to the citizens, becoming more popular recreational area instead of being known only to ecologists and bird watchers. The visitors to the outer parts of the wetland include cyclists, recreational athletes, dog walkers and excursionists (holidays, picnics, etc.).

In June 2021, the city officially started the procedure of protecting the area under the name of "Foreland on Danube's left bank at Belgrade", on roughly 1,858 hectares (4,590 acres). Foreland refers to the land area between the embankment and the river, which is not protected from floods. Two levels of protection were suggested, second and third. Second level would include localities Kubici, Crvenka and Kožara, a total of 522 hectares (1,290 acres). Activities and interventions to enhance and revitalize the area will be allowed in this section. Third level protection will cover 1,335 hectares (3,300 acres) and all potentially harmed activities will be forbidden in the zone. Protected area will span two municipalities, Palilula and Zemun, at the length of 20 kilometres (12 mi) in the north-southeast direction. It is bounded by the settlements and neighborhoods of Vrbovski, Kovilovo, Crvenka, Borča and Krnjača (in the northern direction), and by the Danube (on the south).

=== Belgrade port ===
After General Secretary of the Chinese Communist Party Xi Jinping visited Serbia in 2016, it was announced that the large, new port of Belgrade will be built in the central part of Beljarica. The proposed area of the future port is almost half of the wetland and should cover 8.72 km^{2} (3.37 sq mi) in its central part. The port was planned for the yearly transport of 3 to 5 million tons. Environmentalists protested stating that the partial urbanization and industrialization will fragment the wetland and that remaining small patches of marsh will not be able to sustain such an abundant wildlife. Petition for the preservation of Beljarica was organized in June 2017. By 2017 the proposal of the new port was temporarily retracted for additional revisions.

In February 2020, the government announced construction of the new port. After protests by the ecologists and media, in March 2020, claiming it is acting upon the petitions from the environmentalists' groups, Ministry of Construction announced that the new port will not be built in Beljarica, as they "already dropped the idea". Instead, they will use one of the other three proposed locations, one of which is upstream from Beljarica, which is also considered a bad solution by the ecologists. Any accident in the port, or on the river (oil spills, etc.), will pollute Beljarica anyway. Institute for Nature Conversation stated they are in the process of drafting the protection study Foreland of Danube's Left Bank in Belgrade. The ministry claimed the construction of new port, still on the unknown location, will commence in June 2021, but in March 2021 it was announced that the plan for the port will be drafted in the next year. Beljarica was excluded as the potential location, but the area upstream remained an option.

In November 2021 city announced that location 5 km (3.1 mi) upstream from Beljarica, and the present Pančevo Port, remain the two possible locations for the planned new port. Construction should start in the mid-2023, and will include Belgrade Gateway and Belgrade Dry Port facilities. Beljarica location is praised for the closeness to the international roads, but lacking everything else, like the complete absence of primary and access infrastructure, which makes it much bigger investment than Pančevo, estimated at €105 million.
