= Veliko Blato (Serbia) =

Lake in Belgrade, Serbia

Veliko Blato Велико Блато
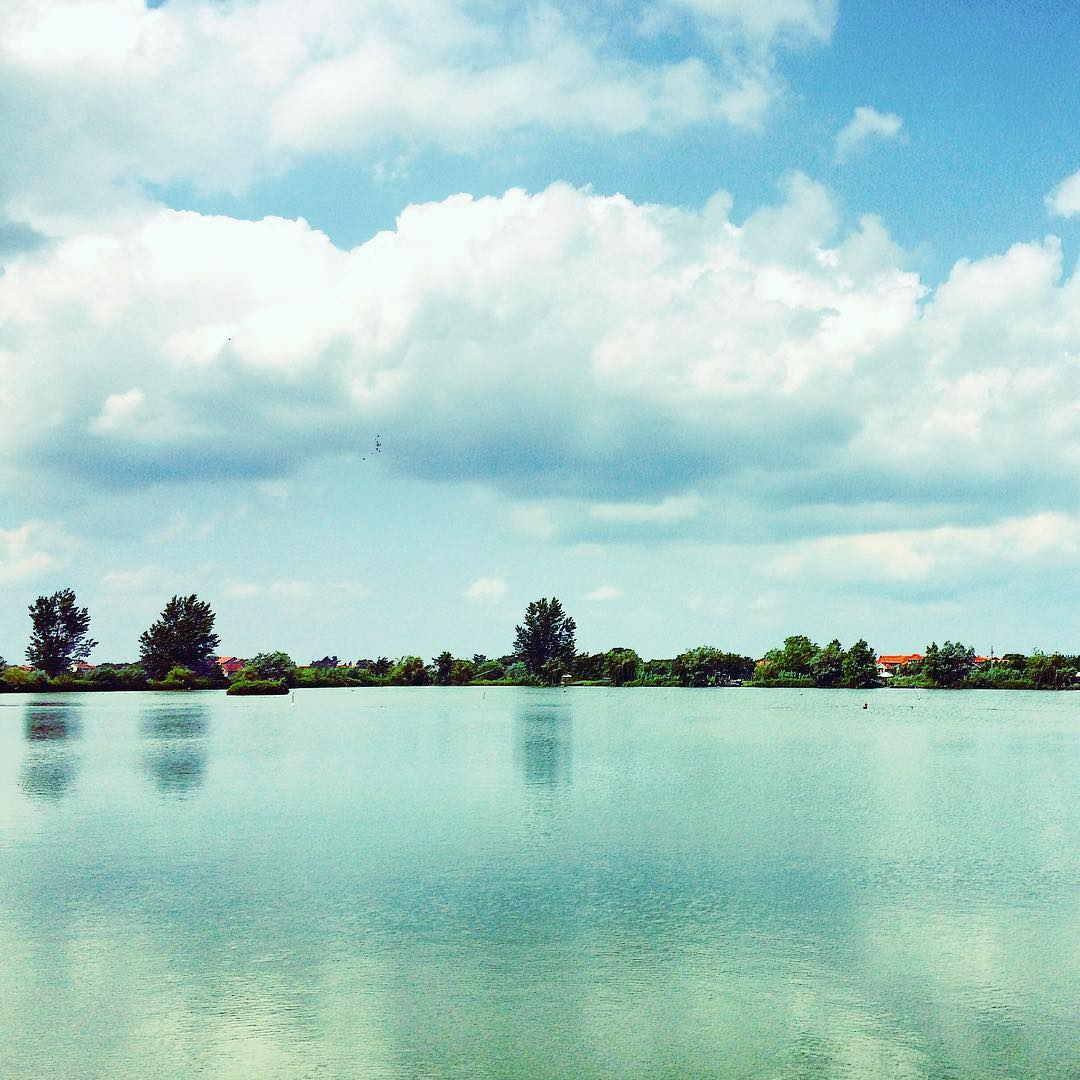
- Lake Veliko Blato

- Location within Belgrade
- Interactive map of Veliko Blato; Велико Блато
- Coordinates: 44.862759°N 20.494819°E
- Primary inflows: none
- Primary outflows: none
- Basin countries: Serbia
- Surface area: 1.8 km^{2} (0.69 sq mi)
- Max. depth: 1.5 m (4.9 ft)
- Settlements: Belgrade

Veliko Blato (Serbian: Велико Блато) is a lake in Krnjača, an urban neighborhood of Belgrade, Serbia. It is located in the municipality of Palilula.

== Location ==
The lake is located in the northern section of Krnjača, 10 km (6.2 mi) north of downtown Belgrade. It is positioned at the tripoint of the neighborhoods of Borča, Ovča and Krnjača.

== Geography ==
Veliko Blato is situated in the southern part of the Pančevački Rit marshland. The lake is generally heart-shaped and covers an area of 1.8 km^{2} (0.69 sq mi) or 2 km^{2} (0.77 sq mi) with the adjoining fish ponds. It is the largest body of water in the Pančevački Rit, though it is shallow, as the maximum depth is only 1.5 m (4 ft 11 in). The area of the entire protected zone which surrounds the lake, and includes four fish ponds to the north, is 3 km^{2} (1.2 sq mi). The lake is embedded in the depression between the reed covered wet floodplains. The lake has no inflows or outflows, though the entire northern part is encircled by the Sebeš canal and another canal closely engulfs the entire lake. Water is replenished from the Danube and through the underground springs.

The name of the lake means "great mudflat" in Serbian.

== Wildlife ==
=== Plants ===
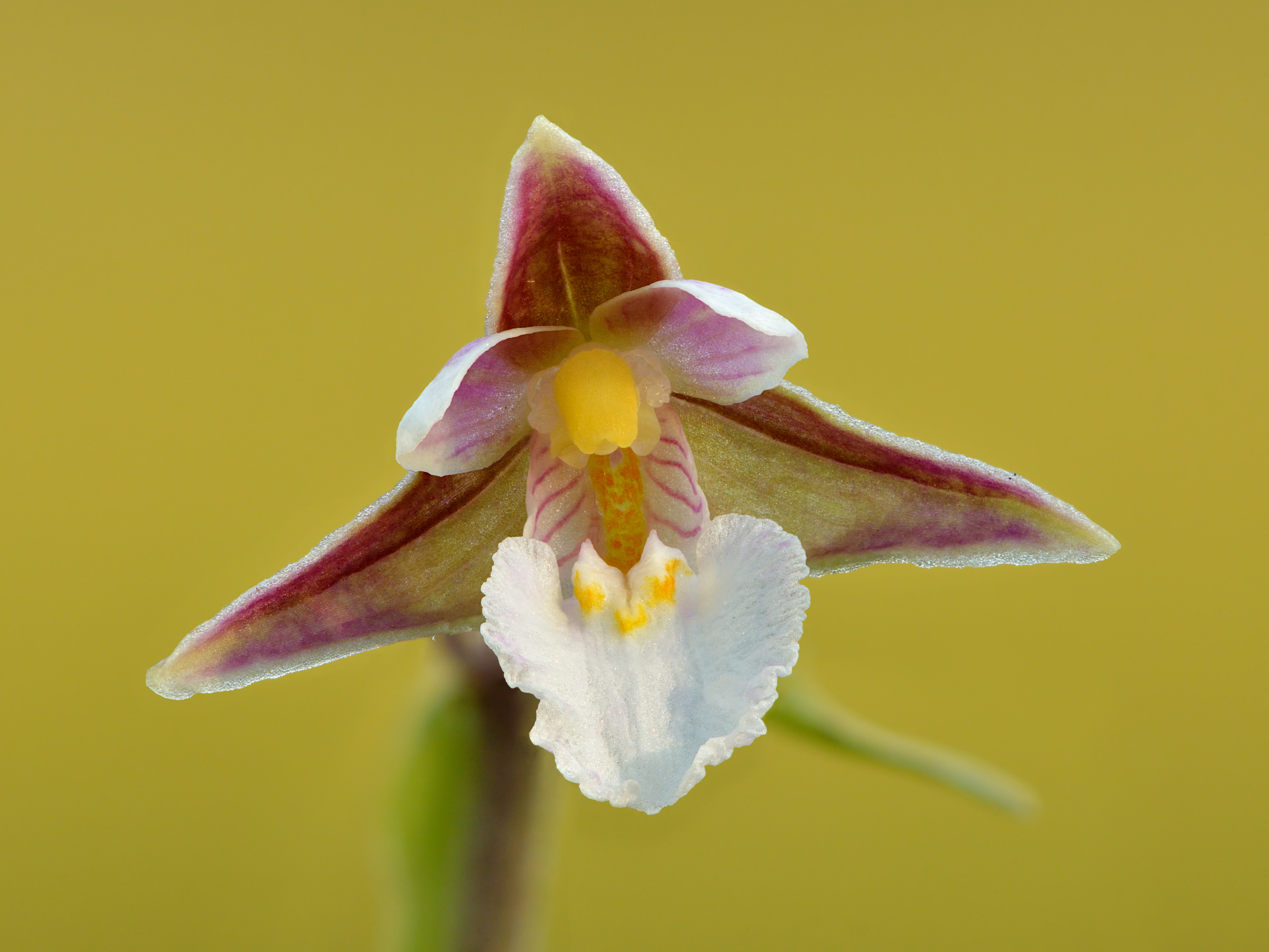
Marsh helleborine

In and around the lake there are 191 plant species, out of which 14 are protected. Since 1865, when Josif Pančić found the first specimen, 30 species of orchids have been registered on the territory of the City of Belgrade. Two of them can be found only in Veliko Blato. One is marsh helleborine (Epipactis palustris (L.) Cr.), with some 200 individual plants. It grows only up to 20 m (66 ft) from the canal which encircles the lake. It was discovered near the lake in 2012. The other, with only some 50 specimens, is Orchis palustris Jacq. It grows between the turfs of grass where the water has dug minute canals. It was spotted for the first time in Belgrade in 1896 on the Great War Island, but was never seen again there. It has been re-discovered in the Makiš area in 1955, but by 2001 it disappeared, too.

=== Animals ===
One species of fish, European weatherfish, is protected. Other of the 15 species of fish include carp, northern pike, wels catfish, zander and silver carp, though they are introduced later. There are also 9 species of amphibians and 4 species of reptiles. The lake is suitable for newts, frogs, lizards, grass snakes and dice snakes.

Veliko Blato is inhabited by 120 species of birds. There is a mixed colony of heron species which consists of little egrets, squacco herons, grey herons, night herons and purple herons. The colony was discovered only in June 2013 and is the only nesting heron colony on the urban territory of Belgrade, with several dozens of nesting couples. Other birds include Eurasian coot, great cormorant, pygmy cormorant, Caspian gull, black-headed gull, diving duck, common pochard, mallard, tufted duck. Largest European eagle, white-tailed eagle, nests in the other parts of Belgrade (Great War Island, Ada Huja), but feeds in the area. The lake is an internationally important area for the bird protection.

== Human interaction ==
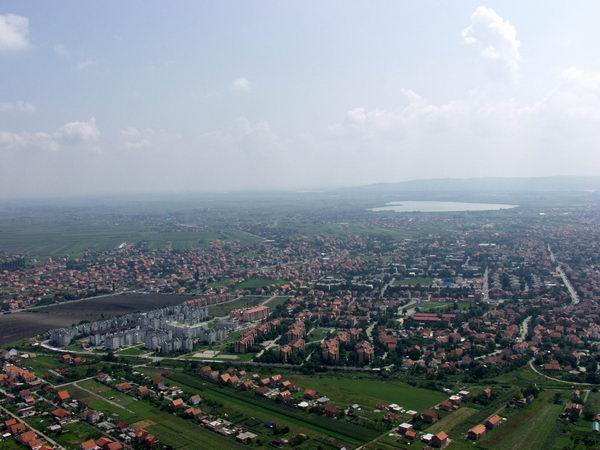
Aerial view of Borča with heart-shaped Veliko Blato in the distance

"Mika Alas", carp-breeding fish pond was established in 1961, when the lake was populated with many fish species. Veliko Blato is used as a feedlot for the larger fish. Four basins (including two fry ponds), north of the lake, are built as a part of the fish pond. The lake is used for the sports fishing and all the fish that has been caught, must be released back into the lake. Every year, after the fishing season is over, the smaller basins are being emptied. Some 250 to 300 tons of carp is being produced for the market yearly.

Massive fish kill was reported in May 2022. It was the result of the fecal wastewater being poured in the Sebeš stream at the Knez Petrol industrial complex. In turn, the Sebeš, which encircles the lake and the fishponds on the north, polluted the fishpond waters. It was the largest fish kill, though smaller ones were reported earlier: the industrial complex is used by numerous chemical and oil facilities, and the wastewaters are regularly being poured into the Sebeš. The Bajbok channel used to drain Sebeš' flow into the Jojkićev Dunavac, the ending section of the Vizelj stream, but was partially filled in the early 2010s.

The clog was a deliberate action by the state forestry company "Srbijašume", so that they can collect old trunks, but the earthen clog remained. Weekend houses were subsequently built on the location. This prevented the flow of fresh water into the fishponds during the dryer seasons. The "Srbijašume" began the process of restoring the Bajbok around 2020, but quit at some point. The poaching also became a big problem by the 2020s. As many fishponds in Vojvodina, to the north, were closed, the poachers turned to Belgrade area. Operating in the fishponds of Veliko Blato, they are described as the Bond-like villains, with wetsuits, night vision goggles, ready vehicles, and are capable of stealing tons of fish.

When city administration in 1965 considered relocation of the city zoo from the Belgrade Fortress in downtown, Veliko Blato was one of the locations on the outskirts of the city envisioned as the possible new location of the zoo by the city general plan. Ultimately, the zoo wasn't relocated.

In the early 2010s, an illegal dumping created a landfill south of the lake, which hastened the procedure of placing the lake under protection. Veliko Blato is not suitable for swimming and bathing due to the large quantities of silt in it.

== Protection ==
Veliko Blato is a high valuable biotope, especially given its vicinity to the big city. It is part of an ecological area "Sava's mouth into the Danube" and due to its importance for the nesting, migration and wintering of the birds, it has been declared an Important Bird Area. It has been officially protected by the city government in May 2017, in the status of the "protected habitat".
