= Great War Island =

Island at the confluence of Sava into Danube

- (Serbian: Велико ратно острво Veliko ratno ostrvo)
- IUCN category IV (habitat/species management area)
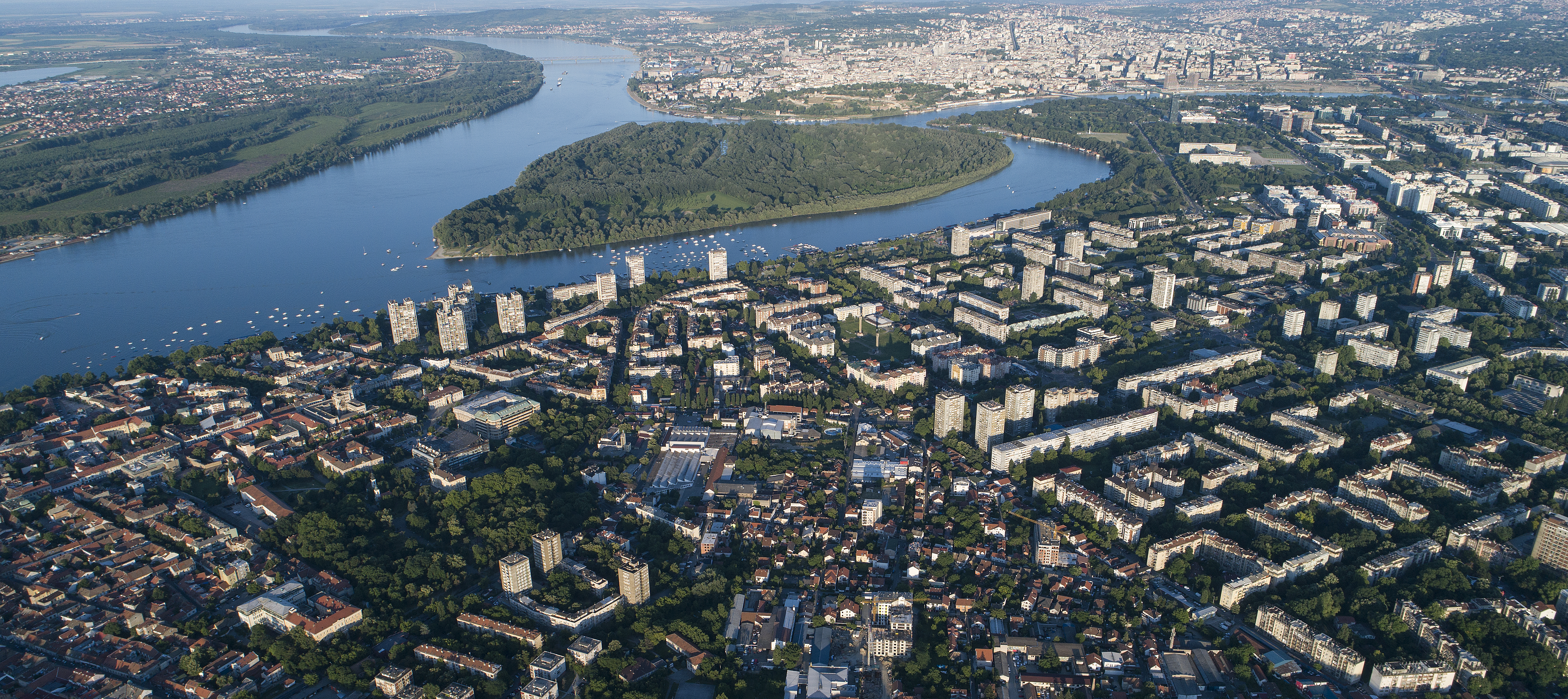

- Location within Belgrade
- Location: Zemun, Belgrade, Serbia
- Coordinates: 44.831632°N 20.435798°E
- Area: 2.11 km^{2} (0.81 sq mi)
- Established: 2005

Great War Island (Serbian: Велико ратно острво, Veliko ratno ostrvo) is a river island in Belgrade, capital of Serbia. It is located at the confluence of the Sava and Danube rivers. Though uninhabited, the island is part of the Belgrade City proper, and belongs to the city municipality of Zemun.

== Location ==
Great War Island is located at the mouth of the Sava river into the Danube, in the Danube's widening between the Kalemegdan fortress as the ending section of the Terazije ridge of the northernmost part of Šumadija on the west and the low, easternmost section of the Syrmia plain, the modern Ušće neighborhood of New Belgrade, on the south.

The island is relatively close to the banks, at the closest it is just 200 m (660 ft) away from both New Belgrade and Kalemegdan. On the south, halfway between the Great War Island and Ušće is the remnant of Little War Island.

In 2005, an initiative was started to transfer the island administratively, from Zemun to the New Belgrade municipality. The initiative ultimately failed.

== Name ==
The island gained its militant name due to its history as an important strategic point either for the conquest or the defence of Belgrade. It had especially good position for cannons and was usually used as the starting point for the attack on Belgrade's harbor. It was also used as the hiding place for hajduks, Šajkaši, and various river pirates. Numerous military facilities and fortifications were built and demolished on the island in time. During the wars, temporary, pontoon bridges were built connecting the three river sides (Belgrade, Zemun and Pančevo) with each other via the island, allowing the armies to cross over the rivers.

During history, almost a dozen different names for the island were recorded, some of them colloquial and unofficial. They include Dunavsko ostrvo (Danubian Island), Cigansko ostrvo (Gypsy Island), Veselo ostrvo (Merry Island), Vojno ostrvo (Military Island), Ratno ostrvo (War Island), Ratna ostrva (War Islands, when applied jointly to the Little War Island), Babalık ada (Babalık Island), Veliko vojno ostrvo (Great Military Island), Veliko ostrvo rata (Great Island of War) and Sirotinjsko ostrvo (Poor Man's Island). The present name, Great War Island, appeared in the mid-19th century and became permanent after World War I.

== Geography ==
The Great War Island is generally triangular in shape and covers an area of 2.11 km^{2} (0.81 sq mi). It is low, for the most part marshy and often flooded by the Danube. The main physical feature on the island is the canal of Veliki Galijaš. It is a remnant of the canal around which the sediments formed the opriginall barrier island which later joined into one. In time, the canal was cut off from the Danube and effectively turned into a lake, with an area of 0.24 km^{2} (0.09 sq mi) and the major natural bird and fish spawning area on the island. Next to it was a smaller wetland, Mali Galijaš, which was also and excellent natural spawning ground. However, during drought years the lake drains completely causing damage to the closed eco-system centered around it. Veliki Galijaš was revitalized later, but Mali Galijaš was completely covered with overgrowth. Currently some two-thirds of the island is used as a nature reserve for 196 bird species, many of which are endangered. One of Belgrade's beaches, Lido, is located on the northern tip of the island.

Geologically, the island is a Quaternary formation which formed at the mouth of two large rivers. Developed around several "pillars" (areas where sedimentation began), the island is a formation which changes and grows all the time (geo-dynamically active terrain). Only since the 1960s, it grew by some 0.4 square kilometres (0.15 sq mi), or fifth of its 2020's size. Sediments are being brought even by the underground water. Because of the sedimentation, occasional drainage and removal of the silt from the northern tip of the island is necessary, as otherwise it would make a land connection to the bank of the Danube.

== Wildlife ==
=== Plants ===
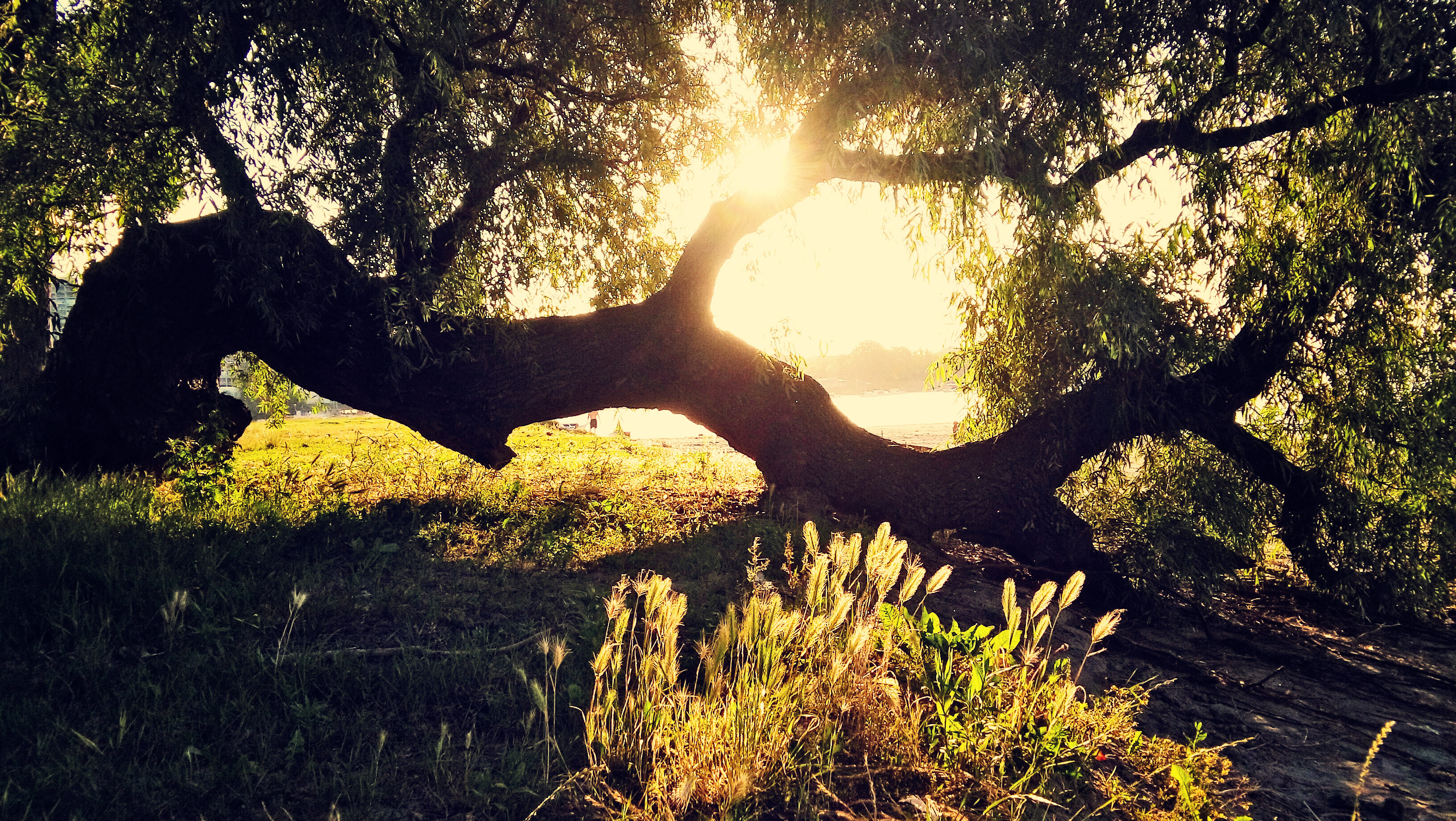
Naturally fallen tree on the island

Plant life on the island includes the typical marshy flora, like reed, yellow flag or rush, but also trees like black poplar, ash tree, White Elm, elderberry, hawthorn and even some rare conifers.

A rare orchid Orchis palustris Jacq. was spotted for the first time in Belgrade in 1896 on the Great War Island, but was never seen again there. It has been re-discovered in the Makiš area in 1955, but by 2001 it disappeared, too, and today can be found only around the lake of Veliko Blato, in the neighborhood of Krnjača.

The island is the only location in Serbia of the bird's little nest fungi, which is used for the antioxidant extraction.

Forests cover and area of 120 ha (300 acres), or 57% of the island. Tree species include walnut tree and European nettle tree. In November 2011 some 2,500 seedlings of the pedunculate oak were planted. Higher forest coverage influences the micro climate and provides new habitats for the birds. Autochthonous tree species include willow and poplar. By November 2017, the island has been populated with 5,850 seedlings of pedunculate oak, 1,000 of narrow-leafed ash, 1,755 of European white elm and 800 of black poplar. The last two are declared endangered species in Serbia. Also planted were 1,000 bald cypresses, which adapted nicely and began to reproduce.

=== Fish ===
A total of 53 species of fish were found in and around the island.

=== Birds ===
There are 66 bird species which actually nest on the island, 43 non-migratory and 23 migratory birds. In winter, during the nesting period, there are some 80 species present, while in the migration season, number rises to over 100. Some of the species are pygmy cormorant, black stork, mergansers, seven species of herons, over 40 species of ducks, and Icterine warbler. Altogether, 163 different bird species inhabited the island in the early 2010s, but by the 2020s, 208 species of birds were recorded, of which 200 were protected in some way.

The island was the largest colony of the great egret on the entire course of the Danube, maybe the largest one in the Europe. During the NATO bombing of Serbia in 1999, the herons, for the most part, disappeared.

Major attraction on the island is a pair of white-tailed eagles. A nesting couple, they settled on the island in 2010, migrating from the marshland of Pančevački Rit, across the Danube. They built a large nest, 2.50 metres (8.2 feet) in diameter, at the height of 20 metres (66 feet). There are five other nesting couples in the wider Belgrade area, and some 90 in the entire Serbia, but having them reproducing at only 2.5 kilometres (1.6 miles) from the downtown of a city of this size is an exceptional rarity. They reproduced for the first time three years later, in 2013. In April 2016, when their chicks were to be hatched, the city's communal services installed a camera in the nest. The project was unique, with the similar one in Estonia, but Belgrade is the only European capital to have it. Before the next generation of chicks hatched in 2017, live feed was posted online. The largest European eagles, with the wingspan up to 2.4 metres (7.9 feet), are best observed from the neighboring Ušće and Dorćol districts, but they are being spotted circling above the Kalemegdan and the Republic Square, practically the center of Belgrade.

The couple was named Radovan and Ruža. In the summer of 2021, one of their male offspring, Dušan, was tagged with solar-battery satellite tracker. The technology helped management of the growth of the griffon vultures population in the Uvac Special Nature Reserve. It is introduced here for the same purpose and survey of the Belgrade's surrounding nesting areas of white-tailed eagles, like the wetlands of Beljarica or Reva.

=== Mammals ===
On the 9 October 2008 a species of the pygmy bat, soprano pipistrelle, was discovered on the island. It is a rare mammal, having a wingspan of 17 cm (6.7 in) and weight of only 4 g (0.14 oz). Naturalists suspected that soprano pipistrelle lives in Serbia, in the Obedska bara region, but this was the first time that the bat was actually seen and caught. There are numerous colonies of various bat species on the island.

In October 2008, 21 species of mammals were recorded on the island. They included, in Belgrade rarely seen, otters, nutrias, weasels and European pine martens, but also a roe deer.

There is a colony of wild boars on the Great War Island. The population originated from the marshy area of Pančevački Rit and they reached the island swimming to it during one of the previous floods. As of 2019, it was estimated to have over 35 individual animals. Rarely, they swim across the arm of the Danube which separates the island from the urban mainland, and can be seen in Zemun or Novi Beograd. Popular case was from 2014 when a wild boar was discovered in the garage of the Energoprojekt holding company. In June 2019 due to the rise of the water level which flooded the entire island, wild boars scattered all over Belgrade, making media sensation. Numerous videos and photos of boars swimming across the rivers were posted. A small herd of wild boars was seen in New Belgrade's Block 30. Animals, including disoriented solitary piglets which is highly unusual behavior, were seen in Block 8 and in the neighborhoods of Ušće and Zemunski Kej. Wild boars have even been spotted in Belgrade's downtown: in Belgrade Fortress and Obilićev Venac, where one animal fell to its death from the multistorey car park. Though hunting organizations stated that there is no danger as wild boars avoid people, Ministry of Agriculture issued a warning, stating that people should abstain from night walks in the forested area across the island.

Fluctuating number of wild boars grew again by 2020 and they began to completely devastate gardens kept by the people from the mainland. However, as the area is protected and the gardens shouldn't be there at all, no official action was taken. Still, the authorities tried to relocate a number of boars to another location. Traps were placed, but the boars ate 300 kg (660 lb) of corn placed as a decoy in two days, and only one piglet was trapped. Growing numbers of wild boars were reported in the wider Balkans area (rest of Serbia, Bulgaria) due to the favorable climate conditions in 2020 but more to the COVID-19 pandemic which restricted hunting.

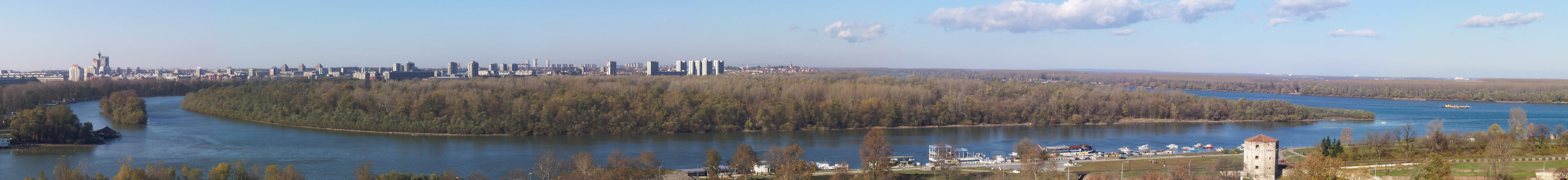
Panorama of the island, taken from Kalemegdan fortress.

== History ==
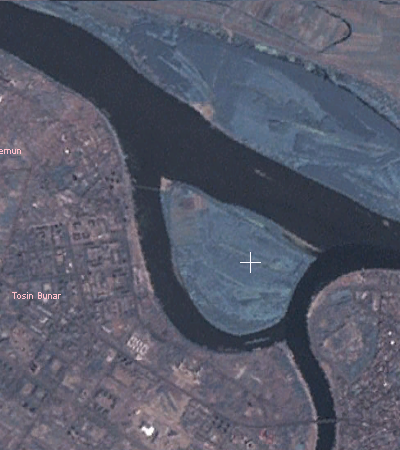
Satellite view of Great War Island

Great War Island is not an old geographical feature. Based on the historical data and descriptions of the river battles on the Danube, it is believed that it has been fully formed as an island in the second half of the 15th century. It had origins as a small 14th century sandbank which was divided and morphed by the Danube, as depicted on some engravings. Blueprints of the Belgrade Fortress from 1456 confirm the existence of the sandbank. The arm of the Danube which divided the sandbank was called Dunavski potok (Danube's stream or creek).

It appeared on the proper maps for the first time in the 1514-1528 map Tabula Hungariae by the cartographer Lázár deák. Historian Kome chronicled the fall of Zemun to the Turks in 1521 and mentioned the island as the location where all of the imprisoned defenders of the city were interred, including their wives and children. In 1521, when Belgrade was under siege by Turkish forces, the majority of their attacks on Belgrade fortress were launched from the island. Ottoman traveler Evliya Çelebi visited the region in the 1660s and mentioned the island. He wrote about the mosque on the island, named after a certain Ahmet Babalık. One of the earlier names for the island, Babalık Island, came from the name of the mosque. First written record on the island from someone who visited it is from 1699, when an English travelling doctor described it as the "large, forested island".

The name officially appeared after 1717, when Prince Eugene of Savoy used the island as an attack point in his re-conquest of Belgrade from the Turks. In 1741 a Constantinople convention was signed, which resulted in fixing the border between Austria and Turkey, concerning the islands in the Sava and Danube. By the convention, Turkey obtained the section of the island overlooking the Belgrade, while Austria got the other part, in the direction of Zemun and Banat. In liberating Belgrade in 1806 the rebel army headed by Karađorđe also used the island for military purposes, as the Serbian artillery with 500 soldiers was bombing the Kalemegdan fortress from there. Under the command of Miloje Petrović Trnavac and Vuk Ilić, Serbian artillery was out of Ottoman reach and left undisturbed cannonading the Lower Town of the fortress. Turkish city plan from 1863 still used the name Babalık for the island.

During the offensive in 1915 by Austria-Hungary against Belgrade, Austria-Hungary forces used the island to launch their attacks. After the World War I, island became part of the new Yugoslav state. After 1918, a small colony of 20 destitute inhabitants of Zemun built stilt houses on the island which was then colloquially called "Sirotinjska Ada" (Poor man's Island). In this period the entire area of the island was cultivated, mostly corn and watermelons. On the lower tip of the island, a beach was arranged and named Dorćol Beach or Lapat Beach. Also, a sandbank facing Zemun was adapted into the beach, being predecessor of the modern Lido beach, which was named this way at least before 1931.

First urban plans for the island were drafted in 1923, when the island was envisioned as an elite park area. The Belgrade's first general urban plan, adopted in 1924, included sports center on the island, and construction of the bridge to the mainland. In 1928, building company "Šumadija" proposed the construction of the cable car, which they called "air tram". The project was planned to connect Zemun to Kalemegdan on Belgrade Fortress, via Great War Island. The interval of the cabins was set at 2 minutes and the entire route was supposed to last 5 minutes. The project was never realized.

When construction of New Belgrade began in 1948, the city government made a decision to completely destroy the island by using its sand and earth to cover the marshes of Syrmia, where new city was to be built. However, the deposits of alluvial materials continually brought onto the island from the Danube completely prevented this from happening. Instead, the smaller Little War Island served this purpose and was nearly destroyed in the process.

Another proposed project after World War II included construction of the bridge and the major sports-recreational center on the island. Center of the island was to be transformed into the large, circular lake. The project was dropped in 1972. As the island has numerous water springs below its surface, from 1976 to 1985 plans were developed for using the island as the water source for the city, but this idea was abandoned, too.

Though officially uninhabited, almost a dozen people live in small shacks in the island's interior. They are mostly retirees who move to the island during the warm season and maintain their vegetable gardens, while in the winter they return to Belgrade.

In 2005, the island was protected by the state as a landscape of outstanding features. The protected area of 2.11 ha (5.2 acres) includes both the Great War and the Little War islands.

=== Bridge proposals ===
The official city idea of constructing a bridge to the island was abandoned in 1972. Since the early 2000s, a military pontoon bridge has been placed each summer during the swimming season on the Lido Beach. It connects the beach and the neighborhood of Zemunski Kej, across an arm of the Danube. As the beach was almost wiped out during the disastrous 2006 European floods, the bridge wasn't laid in 2006–08. In general, the bridge is laid from July to September. It is 375 m (1,230 ft) long and placed by the engineering units of the Serbian Armed Forces. Placing of the bridge regularly sparks protest from the boatmen, either those who work as a ferrymen when there is no bridge, or those who are simply blocked in the Danube's arm between the island and the bank across it.

In time, there were several propositions of building a proper bridge to the island, though environmentalists are against it. A project for the bridge on two levels to the island was drafted. Designers envisioned that the top level ("upper bridge") would contain a scenic viewpoint and a restaurant. The idea was abandoned. It was partially done because the design for the bridge, made of concrete and wood, didn't take into the account high water levels of the Danube. The project also included construction of the touristic complex on the island.

In March 2016, mayor of Belgrade Siniša Mali announced the massive reconstruction of the Old Sava Bridge. However, in May 2017, after the project papers were publicized, it was obvious that the city actually wanted to demolish the bridge completely and build a new one. Citizens protested while the experts rejected the reasons named by the authorities, adding that it would be a waste of money on an unnecessary project. Mali said that the old bridge will not be demolished but moved, and that citizens will decide where, but he gave an idea to move it to Zemun, as the permanent pedestrian bridge to the Great War Island. In an article "Cloud over the Great War Island", Aleksandar Milenković, member of the Academy of Architecture of Serbia, opposed the motion. He expressed fear that having in mind the "synchronous ad hoc decisions of the administration", the reaction should be prompt as the seemingly benign idea is actually a strategically disastrous enterprise (concerning the protected wildlife on the island). He also suspects that the administration in this case, just as in all previous ones, will neglect the numerous theoretical and empirical guidelines.

The Old Sava Bridge relocation to the Great War Island was ultimately scrapped. In March 2019, city urbanist Marko Stojčić said that the bridge will be placed across the Sava, as an extension of the Omladinskih Brigada Street, in the New Belgrade's Block 70-A, and that it will connect it with Ada Ciganlija. In June 2018, architect Bojan Kovačević stated that Mali got the idea of connecting the island because of the meeting held several month before, where the Eagle Hills company, an investor of the highly controversial Belgrade Waterfront project, discussed with the city officials a possibility of construction on the island. The project should include the private villas, golf courses and a de lux hotel.

During the summer season of 2020, group of Zemun's citizens organized petition for the construction of permanent bridge to the island. In September 2020, the municipal administration of Zemun forwarded the preliminary design of the possible bridge, higher than previously designed, to the city administration. In October 2020, city announced construction of the bridge for 2022, reannouncing it in January 2022. President of Serbia Aleksandar Vučić said in August 2023 the "place for the [Old Sava] bridge has been already found", connecting Zemun and the Great War Island, and that he will "nominate" the idea to citizens.

=== Recent developments ===
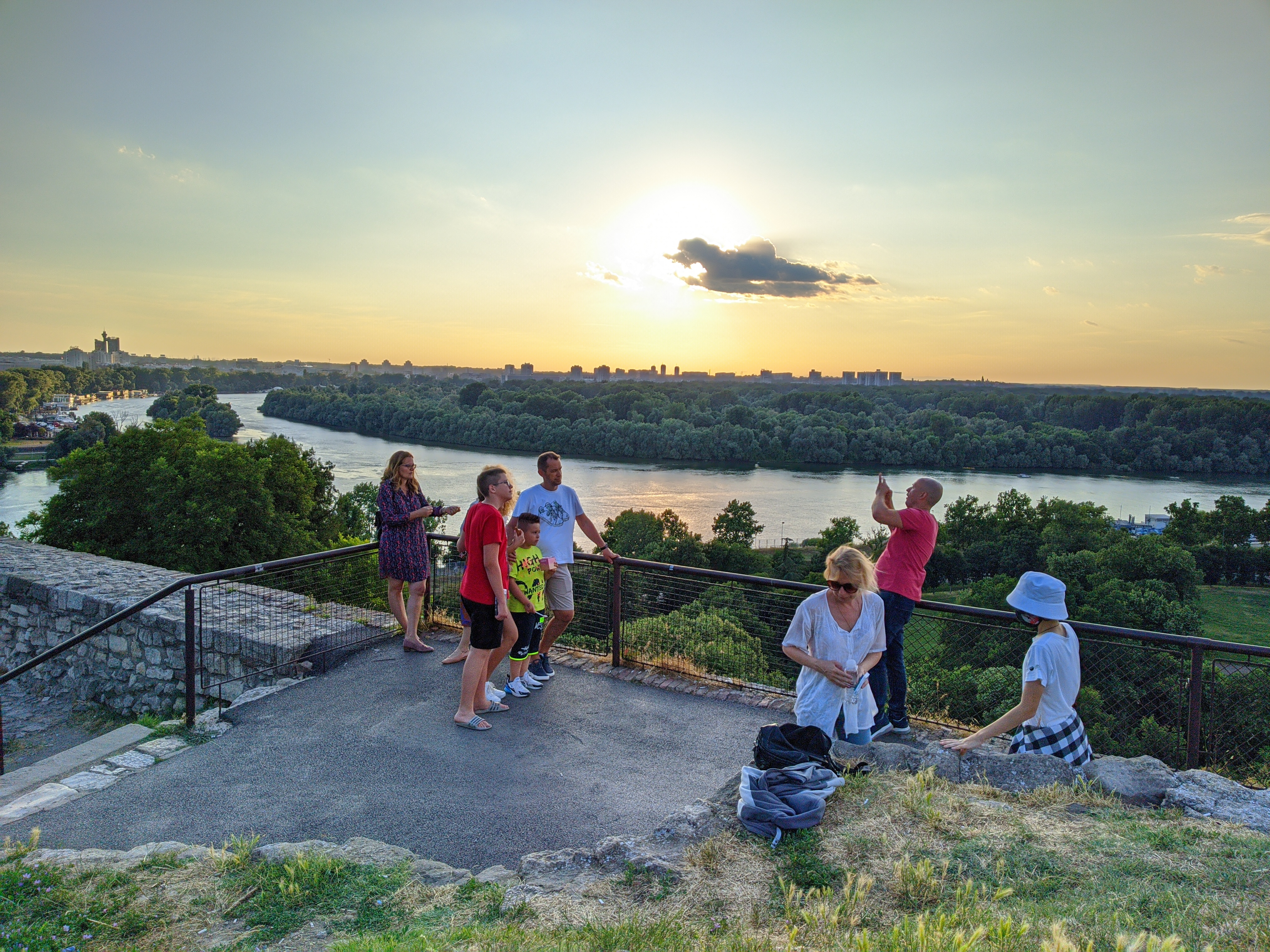
View on the island from the Belgrade Fortress

In the early 2000s, speculations concerning the island's future emerged among the public, including the ideas of turning it into a grand amusement park, possible relocation spot for the Belgrade Zoo or that sections of the island should be leased to the cultural representatives of the different countries which would turn each section into ethno-park of their native culture, in which case the island would be renamed to Dunavsko ostrvo (Danube Island). The analysis has been done for the zoo to be built on the island, but the conclusion was against it due to the constant floods. There were even more grand plans which included construction of "Belgrade's Manhattan" on the island, and a gondola lift which would connect it to the Belgrade Fortress., but all this was dropped in 2005 when it was finally decided that the island should remain intact.

In 2002, the island was declared a natural fish spawning area and declared practically the only part of the City of Belgrade where building of facilities like hotels, motels or restaurants is not allowed. The major works on the island began in 2007. In February 2007, following the disastrous 2006 European floods which wiped out Lido from the northern tip of the island, the Great War Island was completely cleaned with all the bulky junk being removed, so as the remains of the old constructions and the 24-hour guarding service was set. Celebrating the June 29, the international Danube Day, an ecology camp made of pile dwellings for students of the Belgrade University was opened. The floods also heavily damaged the flora and the fauna, and it took several years for them to recuperate. A veteran naturalist documentary author Petar Lalović filmed a documentary "Belgrade oasis" in 2012 on the island, further convincing residents that the island must be preserved.

In August 2007, digging of a 300-metre-long (980 ft) canal which reconnected Veliki Galijaš with the Danube also began to prevent the seasonal drying of the lake. A 15-metre-long (49 ft) lookout is to be erected west of Veliki Galijaš so as the entire network of visitor centers on the unsinkable points around the lake and throughout the island for the studying of the bird life. A bio-laboratory and the small boat landing are also scheduled for construction.

Organization of the musical "Eho festival" (De Phazz, Morcheeba, Sonic Youth) on the island in early 2003, despite 80,000 visitors, ultimately ended disastrously because of the bad weather and the financial shenanigans of the organizers. In July 2018 a "Belgreat Festival 2018" was suddenly announced, with participation of Felix da Housecat, Goldie and Cristian Varela, among others. As the island is now protected, the Ministry for environmental protection announced it will block the organization of the festival, so the organizers, citing "technical difficulties", relocated to the "Barutana" club, in the Belgrade Fortress.

In September 2019, city government announced that nothing will be built on the island. A new Detailed Regulatory Plan was adopted, by which the city plans to raise the percentage of green areas in Belgrade from 15% to 25%, including further forestation of the Great War Island, with reinsurance that everything will be done to "keep and preserve" the island. Just few days after adopting controversial plan on massive construction along the Belgrade's main water supply source Makiš, city announced building of the new water supply source on the Great War Island in January 2021. A tender for the study on the matter was announced right away. Intensive expansion of the city and reduced yield of present sources was named as the reason. After the negative public reaction, city officials stated this was just a possibility, an alternative, and that maybe only Ranney collectors will be built, without any further urbanization of the island.

The island was surveyed as the possible water source several times, including in 1939, 1976 and 1981. Some studies showed that this is feasible, and that Ranney collectors, or other types of wells, can be built. However, the studies also showed that the yield would be negligible regarding the total water consumption in the city and that construction of the collectors and wells would be too expensive for the amount of water which will be produced. When flooded, the island can be buried under up to 4 m (13 ft) of water, which would damage to wells. Also, the water drained this way also drains the sewage soiled water either from the Danube or from the arm between the island and the land where city sewage empties. Some labeled the sudden interest in the island as a way to divert highly negative public reaction to the Makiš decision.

In February 2022 city declared the island a public park. That means that all private, but illegal, shacks and gardens on the island will be demolished.
