= Glogonjski Rit =

Coordinates: 44°56′N 20°29′E

- suburban settlement
- Interactive map of Glogonjski Rit
- Country: Serbia
- Time zone: UTC+1 (CET)
  - Summer (DST): UTC+2 (CEST)

Glogonjski Rit (Serbian Cyrillic: Глогоњски рит) is a suburban settlement of Belgrade, the capital of Serbia. It is located in the Belgrade's municipality of Palilula.

== Location ==
Glogonjski Rit is located in the northern, Banat section of the municipality, 18 kilometers north of downtown Belgrade and 3 kilometers east of the Zrenjaninski put road which connects Belgrade with the town of Zrenjanin in Vojvodina. The settlement is built in the central part of the marsh of Pančevački Rit, on the Sibnica canal.

== Name ==
The locality was formerly known as Lepušnica. The settlement was named after the nearby village of Glogonj in Pančevo municipality in Vojvodina and means Glogonj marsh. It is a local center of the sport fishing.

== History ==
As almost all of the settlements in the Pančevački Rit, it was developed after 1947 for housing workers employed in the melioration and later those who became workers of the PKB agricultural company, so even today Glogonjski Rit is surrounded by the PKB plantations. Originally, it grew fast and was nicely arranged and kept. Streets were paved with avenues of plane trees, the settlement had a park, an ambulance and a school. It looked so nice that Yugoslav president Josip Broz Tito took foreign guests to visit Glogonjski Rit, including presidents of Algeria, China and Egypt.

It was one of 9 settlements developed for PKB. But, as the PKB's fortune changed to worse, so did the state of the settlement which is today neglected and deteriorated. The settlers were completely dependent on the PKB, but now they were being left without work. In 2010s depopulation accelerated as inhabitants were moving closer to Belgrade, along the Ovča road or to Borča. With the PKB's collapse and subsequent dubious selling to Al Dahra Agricultural Company, the PKB machines stopped clearing the access road during winter, while public transportation connecting Glogonjski Rit to Belgrade thinned significantly.

During NATO bombing of Serbia in 1999, NATO aircraft targeted the fuel tank of the petrol station near Glogonjski Rit.

== Characteristics ==
Until the 1970s Glogonjski Rit was statistically a separate settlement. Since then, it was administratively attached to Padinska Skela, 5 kilometers to the west, even though the two settlements make no continuous built-up area. If Dunavski Venac would detach from Palilula and become a separate municipality (process began in 2006) it is said that Glogonjski Rit would also be detached from Padinska Skela into a separate settlement again.

On the location planned for the swimming pool, a church was built. It is a small edifice, made of red brick and is dedicated to the Feast of the Cross. The settlement has its own football club "Lepušnica", which preserved the original name of the locality.

== Demography ==
While it was a separate settlement, according to the official censuses, Glogonjski Rit had a population of 1,259 in 1961 and 1,293 in 1971.
