= Široka Bara =

- Location within Serbia
- Location: Banat, Serbia
- Coordinates: 44.9319444°N 20.3458333°E
- Type: marsh
- Primary inflows: Veliki Kanal
- Basin countries: Serbia
- Max. length: 10 km (6.2 mi)
- Max. width: 1–3 km (0.62–1.86 mi)
- Surface elevation: 78 m (256 ft)
- Settlements: Široka Bara

Široka Bara (Serbian Cyrillic: Широка Бара) is a bog and also a suburban settlement of Belgrade, the capital of Serbia. Both are located in Belgrade's municipality of Palilula.

== Bog ==
Široka Bara is an elongated bog, located in the western section of the floodplain of the Pančevački Rit, one of the remaining undried patches within it. It stretches for some 10 kilometers along the left bank of the Danube (approximately from 1183 to 1192 kilometer of the Danube, curving away from the river in the south), while its width varies from 1 to 3 kilometers. It is marshy flooded area, made of smaller ponds and many canals and its name, široka bara, comes from Serbian for wide bog. It is located on the altitude of 78 meters, and apart from the Danube as its western border, it is connected to the canals of Vrbovski (east and north) and Veliki (south-east). Villages of Stari Banovci and Novi Banovci, in Syrmia in the province of Vojvodina are located right across the Danube, while Belgrade's suburban settlements of Vrbovski, Padinska Skela and Kovilovo are located north, east and south-east, respectively. A small settlement of the same name is located on bog's northern tip. It is part of the Beljarica wetland.

== Settlement ==
Settlement of Široka Bara is actually a sub-settlement of Vrbovski (and, as such, of Padinska Skela) located in the northern, Banat section of the municipality of Palilula (Pančevački Rit), 22 kilometers north of downtown Belgrade. The settlement is located 5 kilometers west of Padinska Skela and the Zrenjaninski put road which connects Belgrade with the town of Zrenjanin, in Vojvodina.

First settlement developed around salaš, an outer farm field, after World War I. After World War II, it became a location of one of the many outer farms of the PKB Company, Belgrade' major agricultural company. As farms were becoming more modern and communal infrastructure of the settlement was neglected for decades, population moved out leaving only a dozen of inhabited houses in the early 2000s.
