= Pančevački Rit =

Geographical subregion of Banat, Serbia

Pančevački Rit (Serbian Cyrillic: Панчевачки рит) is a small geographical area in southwestern Banat, Serbia. It is situated between the rivers Danube and Timiş, in Belgrade's city municipality of Palilula.

== History ==
In 1920, French Compagnie des chemins de fer du Midi et du Canal latéral (existed from 1852 to 1934) as applicant of most rational cost-effective proposal for SHS State project, built long network of dams against floods, Rit section deregulated in 1952 again.

The area had its own municipality in 1955-1965 (until 1955 it had four municipalities: Borča, Ovča, Padinska Skela and Krnjača which merged into one municipality, Krnjača, in 1955 which in turn was annexed to Palilula in 1965.

== Geography ==
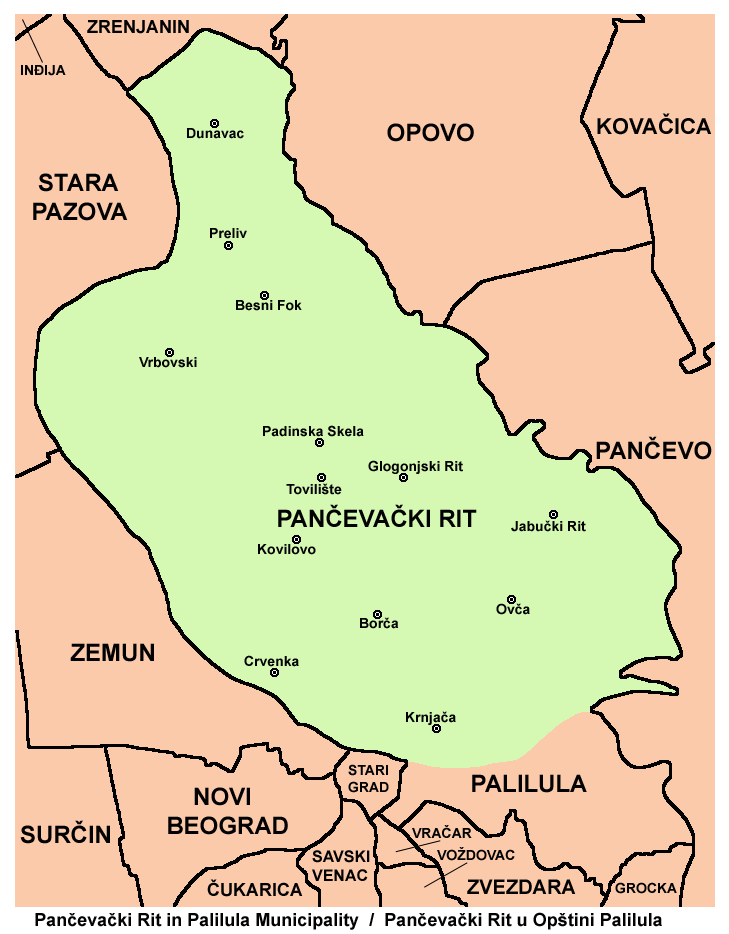
Map of Pančevački Rit

Its 400 km^{2} (150 sq mi) wetland was constantly flooded, but since World War II it has been gradually drained and almost half of it has been turned into a very fertile patch of land, suitable especially for cultivating grains and vegetables. It is managed by Serbia's largest agricultural company "PKB Beograd", which almost exclusively provides food for 2 million people in the greater Belgrade area; thus Pančevački Rit is commonly nicknamed Granary of Belgrade. Stockbreeding is also very intensive, as are fishery and hunting.

Many meandering canals and bogs have remained in the marsh: the slow streams of Vizelj, Dunavac, Sibnica, Butuš, Rogoznica, Buk, Belanoš and Sebeš, and large bogs of Reva, Veliko Blato (2 km^{2} (0.77 sq mi)), Sebeš and Široka Bara. In the south, the area ends with a river island (ada) Kožara (0.44 km^{2} (0.17 sq mi)) and the southwest is occupied by the wetland of Beljarica.

After 1945, a dense system of canals was dug in the region. They mostly serve for the draining of the marsh, with almost all natural streams being adapted into the draining canals. In time, due to the lack of proper maintenance and their parallel function as the sewage, they became synonymous for pollution, being filled with waste and losing their function. As a result, the flooding of the settlements, especially Krnjača, Kotež and Borča, became regular occurrence during the rainy season. In total, there are 900 km (560 mi) of drainage canals, the largest density of agricultural canals in Europe. Of that, 69 km (43 mi) are canals in the urbanized zones and 240 km (150 mi) are specifically built for the agricultural production in the PKB Beograd company.

The defensive embankments on all sides of the region are 90 kilometres (56 mi) long ("defense cassette"), as for six months a year, the waters of the surrounding rivers are higher than the land in Pančevački Rit. Some 53 kilometres (33 mi) are embankments along the Danube (west and south), 32 kilometres (20 mi) along the Tamiš (east) and 5 kilometres (3.1 mi) along the Karaš (north). The land improvement system is complicated. Apart from canals and embankments, it includes 14 sluices, 11 pump stations, horizontal pipe drainage grid, etc. Almost all infrastructure was built by the early 1950s. In the 1990s, large areas of previously agricultural land, was redesigned administratively into the development land. Urban sections of Krnjača, Kotež, Borča and Ovča swelled, with new neighborhoods being built without any permits or new communal infrastructure. Since then, some of the wastewater sewage drained into the canals, which in time turned into the garbage depots. Part of the canals were, without any plans, conducted into the pipes, buried and structures were built on top of them.

The lack of sewage system remained one of the largest problems of the urbanized sections of Pančevački Rit in the 21st century. Politicians continued making promises about the construction of the sewage grid, but by the early 2020s nothing happened. In 2021, it was estimated that some 100,000 inhabitants live in the area, while there are 65,000 individual cesspits.

=== Biodiversity ===
By 2010, there were two major forested areas in the urbanized section of the region: Danube Forest, along the river's bank (9.72 km^{2} (3.75 sq mi)) and Rit Forest, in the inland (3.4 km^{2} (1.3 sq mi)). At the Timiș mouth, in the southeast corner of the Rit, there is a forested area, the Pančevo Forest. It covers 3 km^{2} (1.2 sq mi) of marshland, with several dozen of deciduous species and 176 species of birds and mammals. In 2020 plans were announced, which include construction of the footbridge across the river, beside two existing traffic bridges, which will connect the forest directly to the town of Pančevo.

The marshland is the natural habitat for the wild boars and Pančevački Rit is the location of the largest population of the wild boars on the territory of Belgrade, and probably in the entire Serbia. They are especially numerous in the area bounded by the Pupin Bridge, Crvenka, Borča and Padinska Skela. In the previous decades, as the settlements expanded, boars' natural roaming paths have been intersected by the houses or roads. As the area is agricultural, they feed on the crops (wheat, corn) and roots, but also on the fish and shells so many are found on the banks of the Danube.

In 2020, trees fell by the beavers were spotted in the Krnjača area. Their number began to decline in the second half of the 19th century, almost disappearing by the 1870s. Last specimens in the Pančevački Rit area were spotted in 1900 in Pančevo and in 1902 in Belgrade. Reappearance after 120 years is a result of the successful reintroduction project conducted since 2004 in the Zasavica reserve, some 90 km (56 mi) west of Belgrade. Since then, they spread all through the northern and western Serbia and Belgrade surroundings (Obrenovac, Ritopek). With the expansion of the population of jackals in the outskirts of Belgrade since the 2000s, by the 2020s the animals became most abundant in Pančevački Rit. Around some settlements, their howling became a normal, everyday occurrence. The hunting is legal, and some 160 to 200 jackals are hunted yearly, but they continued to spread in direction of other Belgrade's neighborhoods.

There are two official, unfenced hunting grounds in Pančevački Rit. One is named the same way, while the other is called simply Rit. The Rit is located near Padinska Skela, 15 km (9.3 mi) from Belgrade along the Zrenjaninski put. It covers an area of 82.63 km^{2} (31.90 sq mi), of which 0.5 km^{2} (0.19 sq mi) is a pheasantry. Animals bred in the facility include roe deer, hare, quail, mallard, greylag goose and 13,000 pheasants per year.

== Politics ==
There is a proposal that area on the left bank of the Danube split from the Belgrade's city municipality of Palilula and become a separate city municipality by the name of Dunavski Venac. The proposed new municipality, if accepted and confirmed by the Belgrade City assembly, will have an area of 407 km^{2} and a population of 70–80,000.

== Neighborhoods and settlements ==
Unlike the also marshy area of New Belgrade across the Danube, which has been filled and elevated by the construction standards of the day, Pančevački Rit was drained by the canals and protected from the Danube and the Timiș by the embankments. As a result, almost all settlements are on wet ground and below the river level, which makes them prone to floods, especially in combination with the chronically clogged drainage system.

After being almost uninhabited before the World War II, today its population density is above average for Serbia as a whole, since some of the fastest growing suburbs of Belgrade (Borča, Padinska Skela and Krnjača) have been built there.

Neighborhoods of Belgrade proper located in the Pančevački Rit:

- Blok Braća Marić
- Blok Branko Momirov
- Blok Grga Andrijanović
- Blok Sava Kovačević
- Blok Sutjeska
- Blok Zaga Malivuk
- Čaplja
- Dunavski Venac
- Kotež
- Kožara
- Krnjača
- Mika Alas
- Partizanski Blok
- Reva

Settlements and neighborhoods of suburban Belgrade in the Pančevački Rit:

- Besni Fok
- Borča
- Borča Greda
- Borča I
- Borča II
- Borča III
- Crvenka
- Dunavac
- Glogonjski Rit
- Guvno
- Irgot
- Jabučki Rit
- Kovilovo
- Mali Zbeg
- Nova Borča
- Ovča
- Padinska Skela
- Preliv
- Pretok
- Sebeš (Borčanski)
- Sebeš (Ovčanski)
- Stara Borča
- Široka Bara
- Široka Greda
- Tovilište
- Vrbovski
- Zrenjaninski Put

== See also ==
- List of regions of Serbia
