= Veliki Galijaš =

Lake in Belgrade, Serbia

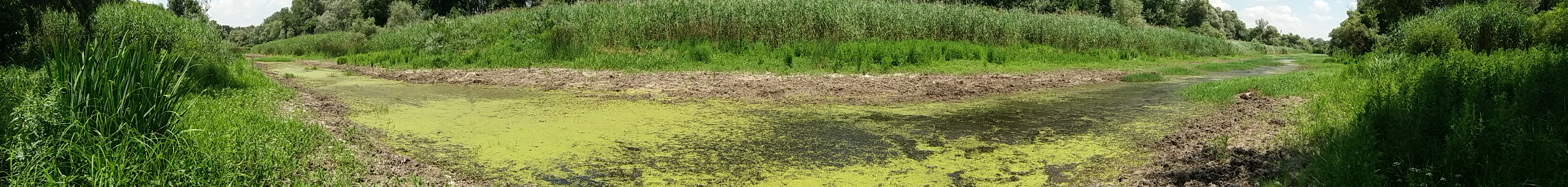
- Veliki Galijaš panorama

- Location within Belgrade
- Coordinates: 44.832°N 20.437°E
- Primary inflows: Danube, Sava
- Primary outflows: Danube
- Basin countries: Serbia
- Max. length: 1,300 m (4,300 ft)
- Max. width: 25 m (82 ft)
- Surface area: 24 ha (59 acres)
- Settlements: Belgrade

Veliki Galijaš or just Galijaš (Serbian Cyrillic: Велики Галијаш) is a canal turned lake on the Great War Island, within the city of Belgrade, the capital of Serbia.

The former canal is one of the major physical features on the island. In time, the canal was cut off from the Danube and effectively turned into a lake, with an area of 0.24 km^{2} and became the major natural bird and fish spawning area on the island, with 196 bird and 90 fish species living in it. However, during the droughty years the lake drained out completely causing damage to the closed eco-system centred on it. In August 2007 the digging began of a 300 m-long canal which would reconnect Veliki Galijaš with the Danube and prevent the seasonal drying of the lake. After it was completed, fish from the Sava began swimming into the Veliki Galijaš. Fishing in the lake is forbidden as in the river zone up to 50m from the island's coastline.

Celebrating June 29, the international Day of the Danube, an eco-camp made of pile dwellings for the students of the Belgrade University was opened near the lake in 2007. A 15 m-high lookout is to be erected west of Veliki Galijaš so as the entire network of visitor centres on the unsinkable points around the lake and throughout the island for the studying of the bird life. Bio-laboratory is also scheduled for construction.

== See also ==
- List of lakes in Serbia
