= PKB Corporation =

Serbian agribusiness company

Coordinates: 44°59′59.6″N 20°24′17.2″E

- Official logo
- Native name: ПКБ Корпорација; PKB Korporacija
- Company type: Joint-stock company
- Industry: Agribusiness
- Founded: 27 December 1945; 80 years ago
- Headquarters: Industrijsko naselje bb, Padinska skela, Belgrade, Serbia
- Area served: Serbia
- Key people: Vanja Milić (General director)
- Revenue: ▼€12.21 million (2019)
- Net income: ▼ (€78.08 million) (2019)
- Total assets: ▼€156.42 million (2019)
- Total equity: ▼€134.48 million (2019)
- Owner: Al Dahra Serbia
- Number of employees: 51 (2019)
- Subsidiaries: Subsidiaries
- Website: www.pkb.rs
- Footnotes / references Business ID: 07042230; Tax ID: 100000717

PKB Corporation (Serbian: ПКБ Корпорација, romanized: PKB Korporacija) is a Serbian agribusiness company. It is headquartered in Padinska Skela, Belgrade, Serbia.

== Name ==
The company uses shortened name PKB Corporation as an abbreviation of the Poljoprivredni Kombinat Beograd (Serbian Cyrillic: Пољопривредни Комбинат Београд, "Agricultural Combine Belgrade").

== History ==
PKB Corporation was founded on 27 December 1945, with headquarters in Belgrade, PR Serbia, FPR Yugoslavia. It was the largest agribusiness company in the former Yugoslavia, offering a variety of services. At its peak it had 42,000 employees throughout former Yugoslavia. During the 2000s, PKB's large departments were privatized, most notably supermarket chain Pekabeta and food companies Imlek and Frikom.

In 2015, the Government of Serbia offered company for sale in public auction with the price of 154 million euros (51% of its assets); however the auction failed as nobody placed offers. In January 2018, it was announced that the Government of Serbia has agreed with the International Monetary Fund (IMF) to sell its stake in PKB Corporation until summer of 2018, in order to further consolidate its finances. In September 2018, the Government of Serbia accepted the sole bid of Al Dahra Serbia which was 105.05 million euros. On 4 October 2018, the contract between the parties was finalized and officially signed. According to the 2018 financial report, total equity stood at 227 million euros.

== Organization ==
As of September 2016, PKB Corporation managed around 30,000 hectares of agriculture land (around 300 square kilometers). Around 23,000 hectares are owned by the Government of Serbia and 7,000 by PKB Corporation. Its total equity was parted in 9 unities (farmsteads), of which eight are located northern of the city area of Belgrade: Čenta, Dunavac, Pionir, Partizanski Prelaz, Padinska Skela, Lepušnica, Kovilovo, Mladost (northern of Belgrade city area) and 7. Juli is located southern of Belgrade's city area.

Most of its production facilities and administration buildings are located in Pančevački Rit (Padinska Skela), which is located 15 kilometers north of the Belgrade city center.

As of September 2016, PKB Corporation had 9,000 dairy cows, 3,500 cattle, 6,000 pigs, 2,000 sheep and 30,000 lying hens. Of motorized equipment, it possessed 330 tractors, 35 harvesters, 90 loading machines and 1,370 connecting machines.

== Subsidiaries ==
- Agricultural aviation PKB d.o.o.
- PKB Green Energy d.o.o.
- PKB Sirpak d.o.o. (in liquidation)

== See also ==
- Agriculture in Serbia
- List of companies of the Socialist Federal Republic of Yugoslavia
