= Little War Island =

Island in Serbia

Coordinates: 44°49′24.32″N 20°26′16.21″E

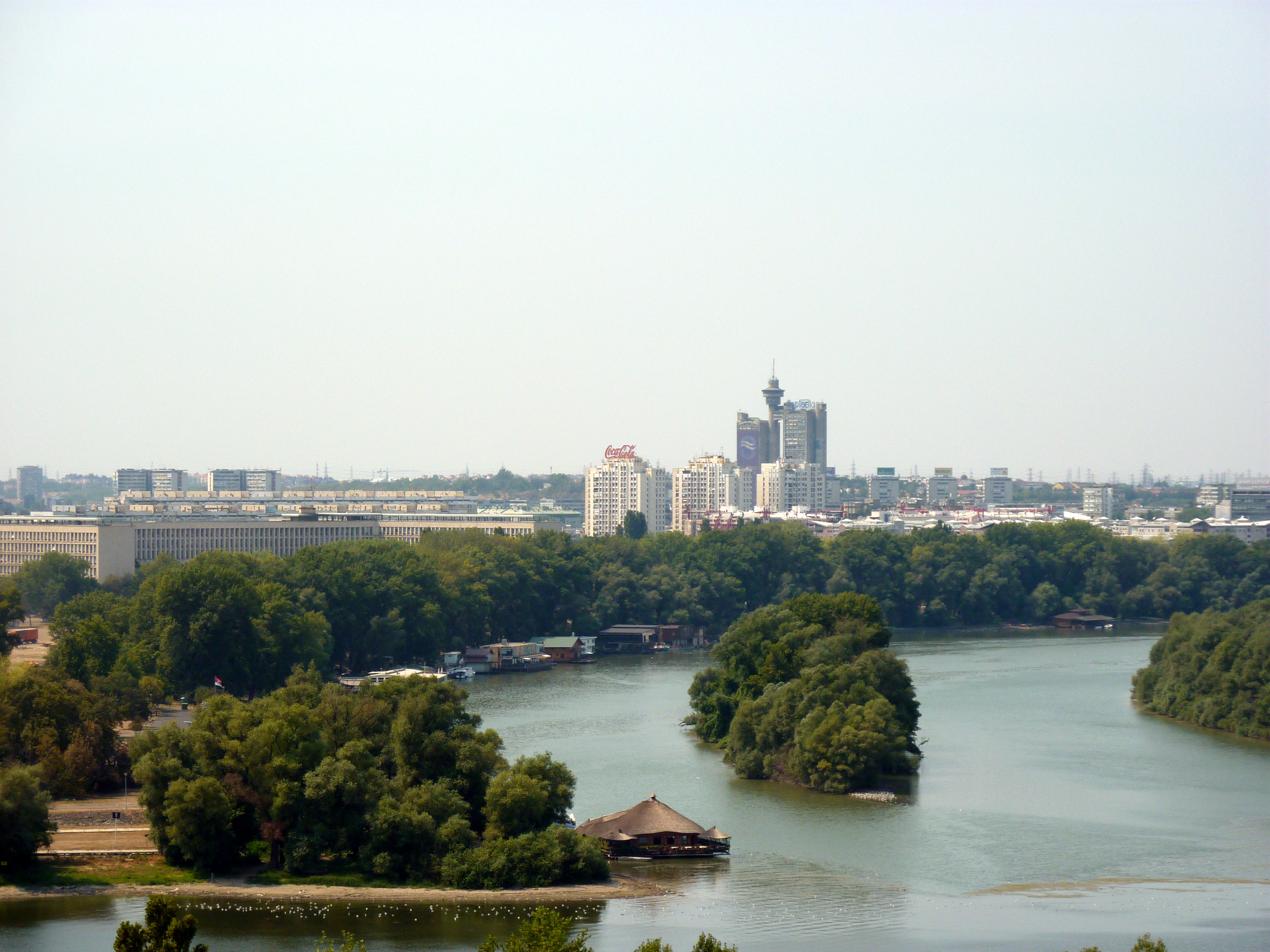
Malo Ratno Ostrvo

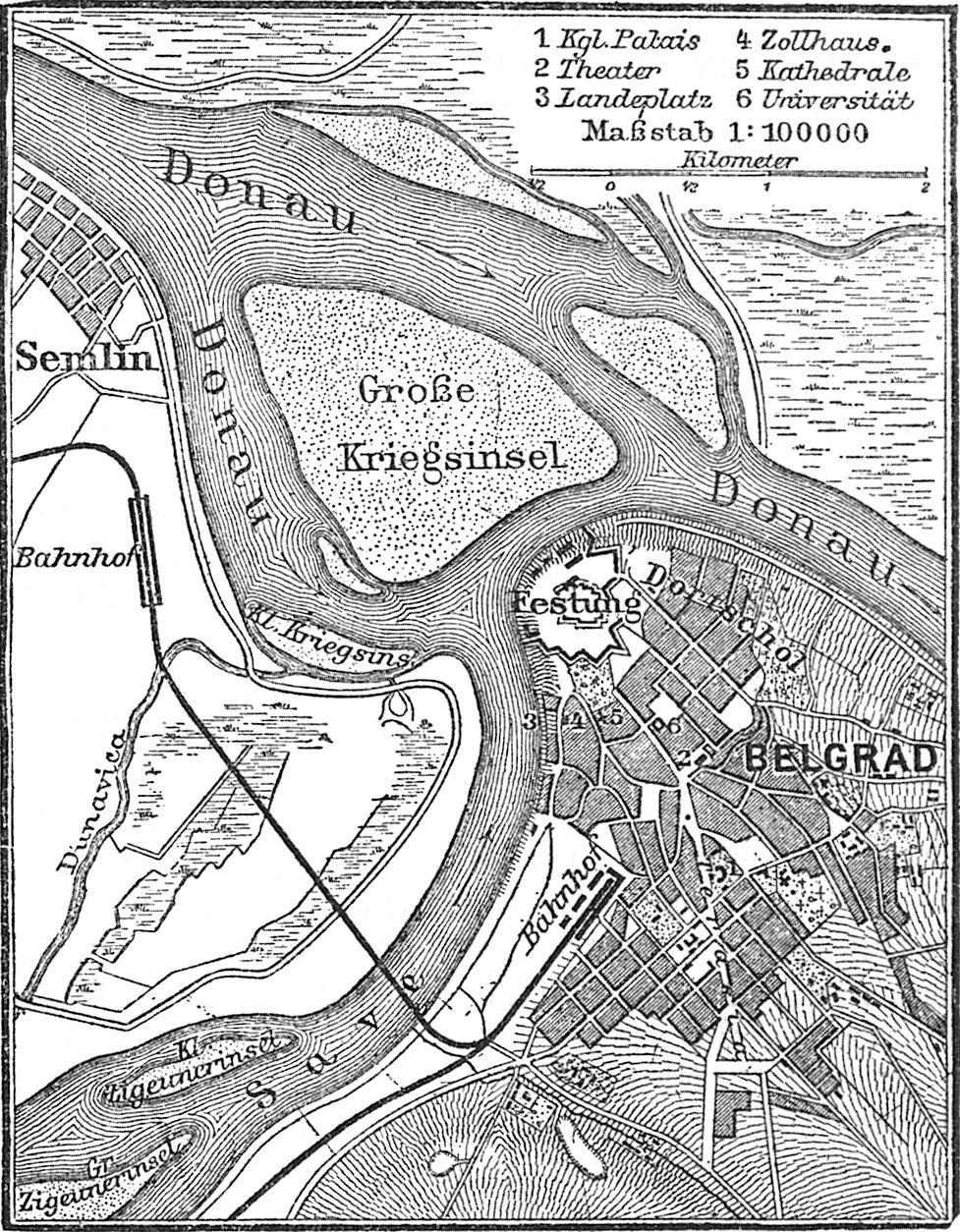
Map of Belgrade in 1890

Little War Island or Malo ratno ostrvo (Serbian Cyrillic: Мало ратно острво) or Horse Island or Konjsko ostrvo (Serbian Cyrillic: Коњско острво) is a river island (ada) in Serbia, located at the mouth of the Sava river into the Danube. It is part of the Belgrade City proper, the capital of Serbia, and belongs to the municipality of Zemun.

== Location ==
The island is located between the southern bank of the Great War Island and the right bank of the Danube in the municipality of Novi Beograd (the neighborhood of Ušće), just 200 metres (660 ft) from the Sava's confluence into the Danube.

== Characteristics ==
The island used to be significantly larger before World War II. When construction of Novi Beograd began in 1948, the sand from the island was transported to the mainland by large conveyor belts and used for covering the swamp on which the new city was to be built. In the process, the island shrank, and sometimes it is poetically said today that "Novi Beograd is a city on the island".

What is left of the island is basically a thin strip of land, less than 300 metres (980 ft) long and 60 metres (200 ft) at its widest. The island is completely covered by vegetation (poplar trees) and inaccessible for visitors, but can be observed from the barges-restaurants on the Danube's bank.

== History ==
The island was previously called Konjsko ostrvo, "horse island". Origin of the name cannot be confirmed by any specific source, but the island was used as a pasture for livestock grazing. Also, when travelling to the other side of the river for trade or supplies, the Prečani left their horses on the island.

== Area protection ==
The natural property of the Great War Island, which consists of the Great and the Small War Island, has been declared an area of exceptional merit since April 8, 2005. It is entrusted to the management of the Public Utility Company Zelenilo-Belgrade and the Administration of the Municipality of Zemun. The decision on protection was made by the Assembly of the City of Belgrade on the proposal of the Secretariat for Environmental Protection. The protected natural asset Great War Island consists of two islands, the Great War Island and the Little War Island. The island's waters have been declared a natural breeding ground for fish within the "Danube III" and "Sava II" fishing areas.

Together with Mali, the Great War Island has been placed under protection for the preservation of picturesque landscape features and undisturbed primary landscape values of exceptional importance for the preservation of habitats, natural rarities, rare and endangered wetland birds, and for the protection of the representative morphological and geological creation of the river island, which was created as the product of the fluvial phase in the bed facies, which has ecological, cultural-historical and recreational significance for the city of Belgrade.

The nature protection zone (level 1 protection regime) has the character of a special nature reserve and includes the entire Malo War Island, the coastal zone of the Great War Island, the forest complex, wetlands within the Great War Island and water bodies around the Small War Island.
