= Vrbovski =

Coordinates: 44°59′N 20°21′E

- Suburban settlement
- Interactive map of Vrbovski
- Country: Serbia
- Time zone: UTC+1 (CET)
  - Summer (DST): UTC+2 (CEST)

Vrbovski (Serbian Cyrillic: Врбовски) is a suburban settlement of Belgrade, the capital of Serbia. It is located in the Belgrade's municipality of Palilula.

== Location ==
Vrbovski, the sub-settlement of Padinska Skela, is located in the northern, Banat section of the municipality (Pančevački Rit), 33 kilometers north of downtown Belgrade. The settlement is located on the Kišvara canal, 8 kilometers west of the settlement of Besni Fok and the Zrenjaninski put road which connects Belgrade with the town of Zrenjanin, in Vojvodina, and 3 kilometers away from the left bank of the Danube.

== History ==
The settlement was established after World War II as a part of the massive melioration in Pančevački Rit. It was named after Viktor Verbovsky, the commander of the company of Russian pilots which were fighting in the area at the time of liberating Belgrade from the Germans in the last stages of World War II, and all of them were killed by the Nazi forces.

== Pollution ==
The settlement is located next to the large cattle farming facility, and surrounded by the vast agricultural area. As a result, for years the canals which surround Vrbovski were polluted and clogged with waste water containing manure. Experimental treatment began in July 2021, using extracts of the sea brown algae Ascophyllum nodosum. It was already used to partially clean the Kalovita canal, to the south, in 2017, for water treatment in Sremska Mitrovica, Kovin and Bela Crkva, but also for extinguishing fires at Vinča landfill in 2017, and in North Macedonia (Gevgelija, Berovo). The experiment will last for at least month and a half, and the bad smell disappeared already after two days.
