= Besni Fok =

- Suburban settlement
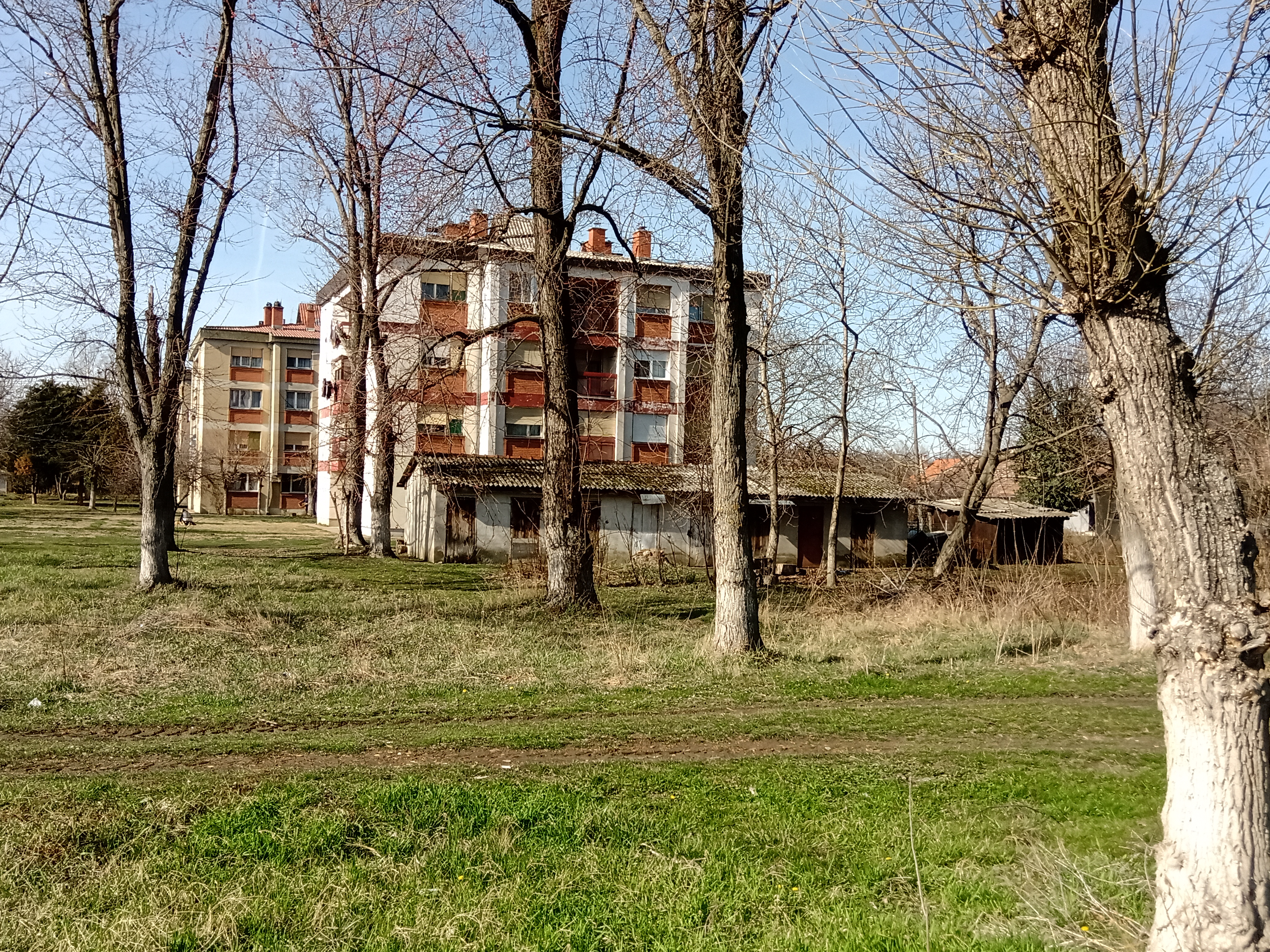
- Besni Fok

- Location within Serbia
- Coordinates: 45°00′N 20°24′E
- Country: Serbia

Population (2015)
  - Total: 1,000
- Time zone: UTC+1 (CET)
  - Summer (DST): UTC+2 (CEST)
- Website: Leva obala Beograda – Besni Fok

Besni Fok (Serbian Cyrillic: Бесни Фок) is a suburban settlement of Belgrade, the capital of Serbia. It is located in the Belgrade's municipality of Palilula.

== Name ==
Name comes from the Serbian word besni which means rabid or wild and the old German word fock which means a canal, so the settlement was called wild canal because of the local canal which uncontrollably flooded the area.

== Geography ==
Besni Fok is located in the northern, Banat section of the municipality, 28 kilometers north of downtown Belgrade. It is built on the Belanoš canal in the marsh of Pančevački Rit, between the rivers of Danube and Tamiš. Besni Fok is placed on the Zrenjaninski put road which connects Belgrade with the town of Zrenjanin in Vojvodina.

== History ==
From the late 19th century, the area was intermittently inhabited, mostly by Hungarians and Germans. In the 1930s several drainage channels were dug, draining the area and making the permanent settlement possible. In 1947 first works on the construction began and first settlers came in 1948. The origin and the future development of Besni Fok was closely tied to the Combined Agricultural Enterprise Beograd (PKB Beograd). Originally the settlement consisted of barracks, later of concrete and brick houses, while proper residential buildings were erected in the mid-1970s. Until the 1970s, Besni Fok was statistically a separate settlement, but then it was annexed to Padinska Skela, which is located 9 km to the south, becoming its neighborhood, though they don’t make one continuous built-up area.

== Demography ==
While it was a separate settlement, according to the official censuses, Besni Fok had a population of 946 in 1961 and 977 in 1971. Estimated population in 2015 was around 1,000.

== Characteristics ==
Besni Fok is a small neighbourhood known within Belgrade despite its small size, in part because of its unusual name, local infrastructure issues, and popularity as a recreational fishing destination.

Since 1967, Besni Fok is a location of the traditional Prvomajski uranak or "Labour Day early outing", celebration of May 1, Labour Day. It is traditionally celebrated with the large camp bonfire and a series of sport activities, including sack race, futsal, tug of war, handball and soccer matches, etc. The settlement has its own football team, “FK Pionir”. Eccentric footballer Saša Ćurčić, who played for Aston Villa, Crystal Palace F.C. and Yugoslavia national team, grew up in Besni Fok.

== Preliv ==
Sub-settlement of Preliv is a stretched row of some 60 houses, 2.5 to 5 kilometers away from Besni Fok. The communal situation is even worse than in the rest of Besni Fok as practically it has no waterworks, roads or even grocery stores, so out of the 60 houses, in 2012 half of them were without residents. Elementary school was closed in the late 1970s and the main road was paved only in 2007. The only economic activity in the settlement is agriculture, which makes it a rare purely rural area as most of the neighboring settlements are oriented towards the agricultural industry.

The name, preliv, comes from the Serbian word for overspill.

== See also ==
- List of Belgrade neighborhoods
