= Pheasantry =

Place for raising pheasants and related birds

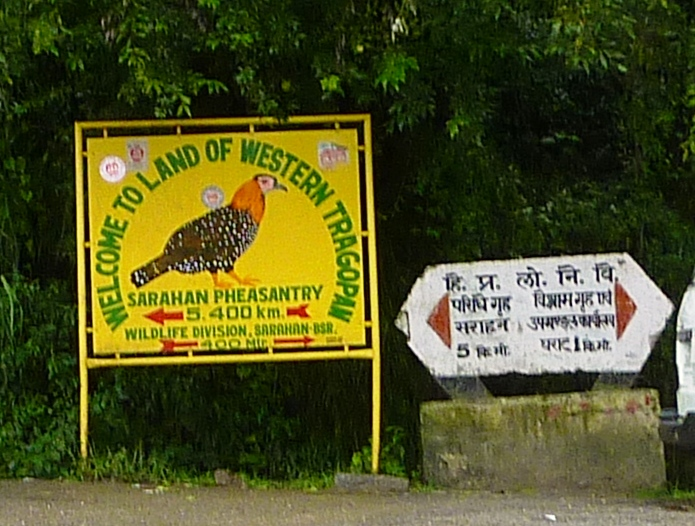
Sign about Western tragopans near Sarahan, Himachal Pradesh, India

A pheasantry is a place or facility used for captive breeding and rearing pheasants, peafowls and other related birds, which may or may not be confined with enclosures such as aviaries. The pheasants may be sold or displayed to public as ornamental animals, or used as game birds. Pheasantries may also be used for conservation and research purposes.

== See also ==
- Aviculture
- Falconry
- Poultry
- Hatchery
