= Ovča =

Ovča Овча / Ovča Ofcea, Ovcea
- Suburban settlement
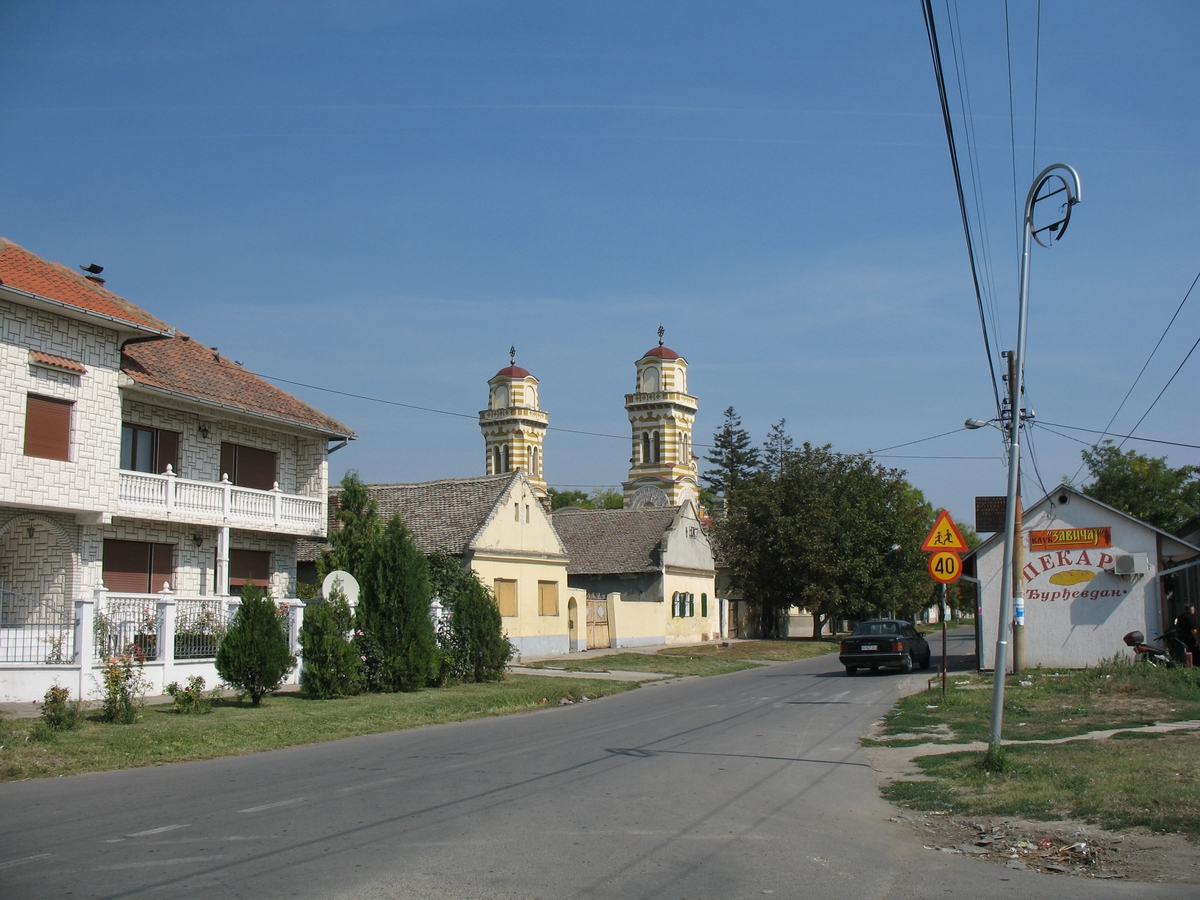
- Street in Ovča

- Location of Ovča within Belgrade
- Coordinates: 44°53′N 20°32′E
- Country: Serbia
- Region: Belgrade
- Municipality: Palilula

Area
  - Total: 24.35 km^{2} (9.40 sq mi)

Population (2011 census)
  - Total: 2,742
  - Density: 112.6/km^{2} (291.7/sq mi)
- Time zone: UTC+1 (CET)
  - Summer (DST): UTC+2 (CEST)
- Postal code: 11212
- Area code: +381(0)11
- Car plates: BG

Ovča (Serbian Cyrillic: Овча, pronounced [ôːʋt͡ʃa]; Romanian: Ofcea or Ovcea) is a suburban settlement of Belgrade, the capital of Serbia. It is located to the northeast of the city, in the municipality of Palilula.

== Name ==
In Serbian the settlement is known as Ovča (Овча), in Romanian as Ofcea or Ovcea, in Hungarian as Ovcsa or Bárányos, and in German as Gisellenhain.

== Location ==
Ovča is located in the northern Banat section of the Palilula municipality (Pančevački Rit), 13 kilometers north of downtown Belgrade. The settlement is located 6 kilometers to the east of the settlement of Padinska Skela and the Zrenjaninski put road connects Belgrade with the city of Zrenjanin, in Vojvodina.

== History ==
First recorded mention of the village of Ovči is from 1456, as part of the Syrmia county of the Kingdom of Hungary. The name has a Slavic origin. As some of the first settlers were Romanian shepherds, it is believed that this gave name to the settlement (Serbian word ovčar means "shepherd" in English). The village was captured by the Ottoman Empire in 1537, and was included into the Sanjak of Smederevo. It was granted a waqf status by the sanjak-bey Mehmet-pasha, for the mosque and imaret (public kitchen) of Belgrade's Dorćol district.

In the mid-18th century the village was evacuated because of the plague outbreak and Ovča sentry outpost was built instead. Turned into a wasteland, the village was repopulated in 1813.

Ovča was part of the municipality of Borča until 30 May 1952 when it got its own municipality. However, in 1955 all the municipalities of the Pančevački Rit were merged into one, municipality of Krnjača, which in turn became part of the municipality of Palilula in 1965. A movement for restoring former municipality of Krnjača (under the name of Dunavski Venac) is gaining momentum since the early 2000s.

== Population ==
Historical population
Year	Pop.	±% p.a.
1921	1,465	—
1931	1,453	−0.08%
1948	1,950	+1.75%
1953	1,767	−1.95%
1961	2,926	+6.51%
1971	3,381	+1.46%
1981	2,530	−2.86%
1991	2,444	−0.35%
2002	2,567	+0.45%
2011	2,742	+0.74%

Population, by the censuses, has been erratic, but is generally stagnating in the past several decades. The apparent decline of population by almost one quarter in the 1970s is a result of change of the administrative borders of the settlements, as many outer farms and smaller sub-settlements were regrouped into adjacent Padinska Skela, which in turn grew by these measures by over 400%. According to the last census of 2011, population of Ovča was 2,742.

=== Ethnic groups ===
The ethnic structure of Ovča:

- Census 1931 (1,452): Romanians (96,42% or 1,400), Serbs (1,58% or 23), Germans (1,38% or 20), Slovaks (0,48% or 7), Hungarians (0,14% or 2)
- Census 2002 (2,567): Serbs (63.96% or 1,642), Romanians (27.46%), Romani (1.36%), Yugoslavs (0.85%), Macedonians (0.62%), etc.

== Economy ==
Despite being classified as an urban settlement, the majority of economic activity in Ovča is still agricultural. Prominent features are the large bowl natural gas tanks which dominate the flat landscape. Ovča is also accessible by train as it lies on the Belgrade–Pančevo railroad.

A new stretch of highway between the Zrenjanin road and Ovča was built and opened in October 2015, as a part of the northern Belgrade bypass connecting Pančevo with the new Mihajlo Pupin Bridge over the Danube. The last section of the bypass, from Ovča to Pančevo road was opened in December 2015. The new road significantly improved transport connections to rather remote Ovča, and is expected to contribute to its development.

== Sub-neighborhoods ==
=== Ovča Spa ===
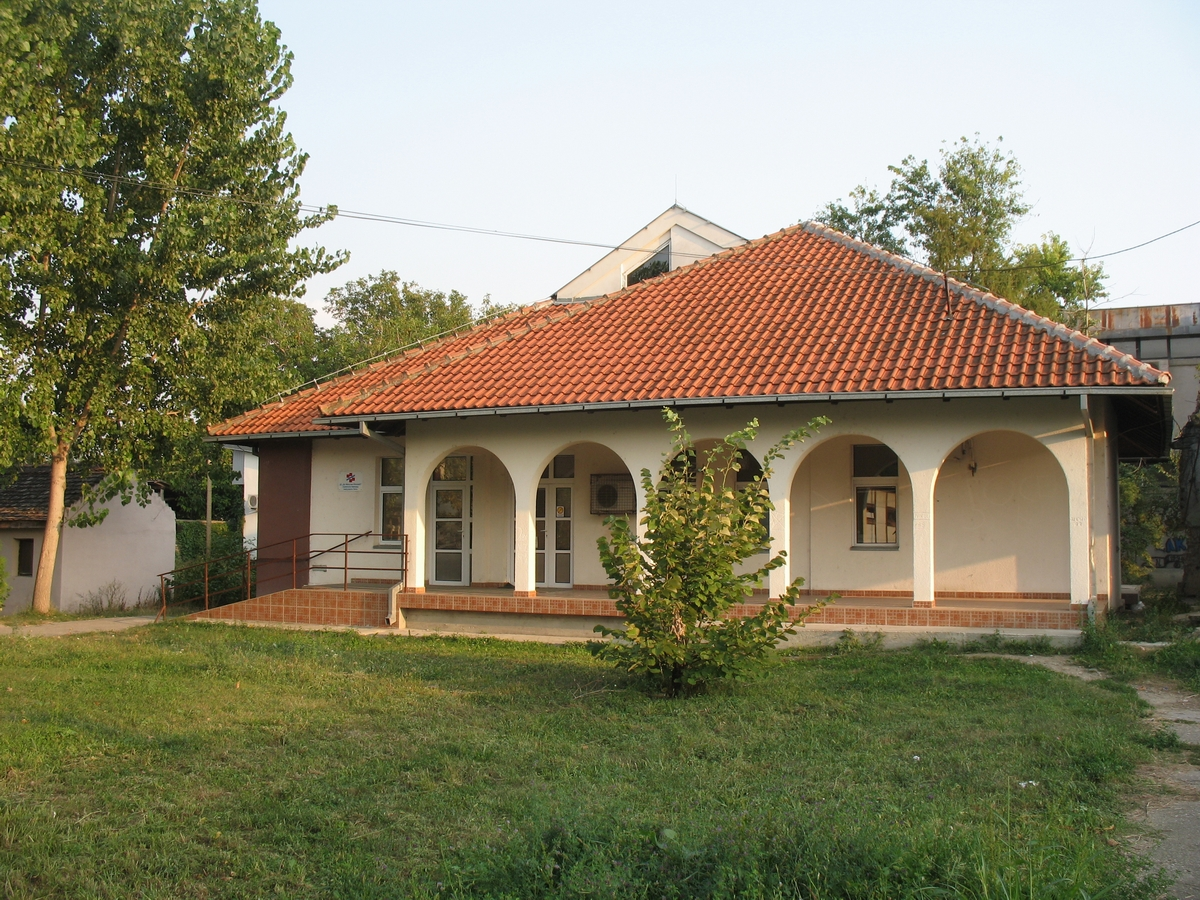
Health center in Ovča

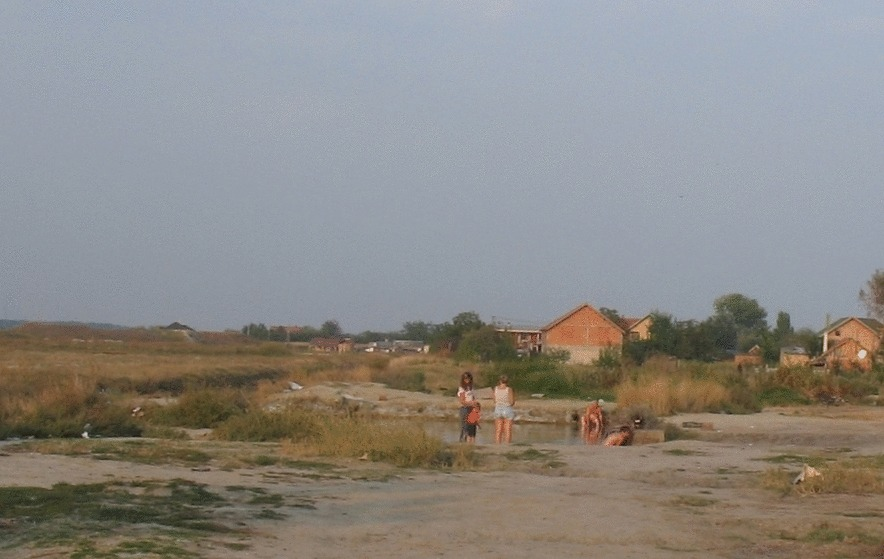
The hydrothermal spring

Hydrothermal spring of Ovčanska banja (Ovča spa) is located in the settlement. A pond with an area of 150 m^{2} (1,600 sq ft) and 1 m (3 ft 3 in) deep has been filled by the natural salt water since the mid-1980s. The spa is not fully arranged for public usage but is very popular among the local population. Water is warm and salty and rich in minerals and sulfur. The healing mud is also used by the visitors. The surrounding canal, used for the melioration of the Pančevački Rit, overflew into the pond, but in 2011 an earthen embankment was constructed which prevented the mixing of waters. Also, the pond was enlarged, cleaned and its bottom was dredged. Surrounding area of 8 a (8,600 sq ft) was poured with the gravel.

The pond is surrounded by the corn fields. The salt water has been tested and according to the city's regulatory plan for the area, it is a sodium chloride water, with elevated levels of bromine and iodine and low levels of radioactivity. Officially, the water is not suited for swimming but it may be used for the treatment of rheumatism, wounds and bone fractures healing, gynecological diseases, etc.

In December 2017, Minister for construction Zorana Mihajlović announced that Ovča Spa was selected as the best location with the scopes of the government's project for building over 20,000 of low-cost apartments for the state employees. She asserted that the terrain will be prepared for the construction in the first half of 2018. It would be a first phase of the plan, consisting of 2,000 apartments, which would later continue in other parts of Belgrade.

By 2018, city tried for several times to sell part of the spa area to developers, but all invitations to tender failed. City then drafted the regulatory plan which, with the development of the new settlement, includes the sports, recreational, touristic and spa facilities within the complex of Ovča Spa.

=== New settlement ===
In September 2016 works began on the new residential complex, which is located at the entrance into Ovča from the direction of Borča. It is planned to have 4,500-5,000 inhabitants, or almost twice more than the entire settlement of Ovča has at the moment. Project covers and area of 7.8 hectares and it will be divided into 4 blocks with 300 apartments each. In total, it will have 15 separate buildings and each one will look different. The project is work of eight different teams, in total 33 architects. It will also have a green market, elementary school, kindergarten, retirement home, playgrounds, sport fields, parks and commercial area. Out of 1,200 apartments, 1,000 are social housing and 200 are so-called “solidarity apartments”. First are to be populated with the people of low economic status (including refugees from the Yugoslav Wars) and the other are for the employees in state owned companies who, during the years, were paying into the residential funds. First phase, of 235 apartments, should be finished by October 2017 when the first settlers should move in. The apartments were finally housed in March 2018, but the construction of other phases of the settlement was halted as the city government gave priority to the social housing project in Kamendin.

The second phase, with 250 apartments, was announced in December 2020. Works were scheduled to start in January 2021 and to finish by March 2020.

=== Nova Ovča ===
In January 2020, city announced construction of the completely new settlement, south of Ovča and along the northern tangent of Belgrade bypass, named Nova Ovča (New Ovča). It was planned to spread over 119 ha (290 acres), with over 5,000 apartments and 15,000 inhabitants. The total planned floor area is 704,000 m^{2} (7,580,000 sq ft), which includes building with no more than 4 floors, numerous parks, squares, 4 kindergartens, 2 elementary schools, 1 secondary school, sports center, cemetery (on 6 ha (15 acres), with church and chapel), etc. Apart from streets, Nova Ovča is planned to be connected with Ovča and Borča with bicycle paths, too.
