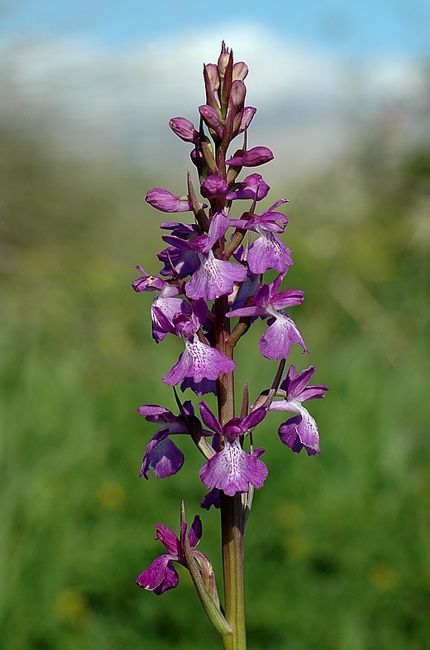
- Anacamptis palustris ssp. robusta

Conservation status
- Least Concern (IUCN 3.1)

Scientific classification
- Kingdom: Plantae
- Clade: Tracheophytes
- Clade: Angiosperms
- Clade: Monocots
- Order: Asparagales
- Family: Orchidaceae
- Subfamily: Orchidoideae
- Genus: Anacamptis
- Species: A. palustris

Binomial name
- Anacamptis palustris (Jacq.) R.M.Bateman, Pridgeon & Chase, 1997

Synonyms
- Orchis palustris Jacq., 1786 (Basionym); Orchis laxiflora ssp. palustris (Jacq.) W.D.J.Koch, 1844; Serapias palustris (Jacq.) Vela & Lallain

= Anacamptis palustris =

Species of flowering plant

Anacamptis palustris is a species of orchid. It is found in Europe, North Africa and western Asia. This orchid is native to Western and Central Europe, the Mediterranean region, the Balearic Islands, Turkey, Western Asia, Algeria and Tunisia in North Africa, and Saudi Arabia.

It is a perennial herbaceous flower, and can be found in humid pastures, wet meadows and swamps. It prefers calcareous soils in full sun. It flowers in spring. The species epithet palustris is Latin for "of the marsh" and indicates its common habitat.

== Subspecies ==
Subspecies of Anacamptis palustris include:

- Anacamptis palustris subsp. elegans
- Anacamptis palustris subsp. palustris
- Anacamptis palustris subsp. robusta — Mallorca (Balearic Islands), northern Algeria, Tunisia.
