= Padinska Skela =

Padinska Skela Падинска Скела
- Suburban settlement
- Location within Serbia
- Coordinates: 44°57′N 20°26′E
- Country: Serbia

Area
  - Total: 216.17 km^{2} (83.46 sq mi)

Population (2011)
  - Total: 9,263
  - Density: 42.85/km^{2} (111.0/sq mi)
- Time zone: UTC+1 (CET)
  - Summer (DST): UTC+2 (CEST)
- Postal code: 11213

Padinska Skela (Serbian Cyrillic: Падинска Скела), or colloquially Padinjak (Падињак), is a suburban settlement of Belgrade, the capital of Serbia. It is located in the Belgrade's municipality of Palilula.

== Location ==
Padinska Skela is located in the northern, Banat section of the municipality, 15 kilometers north of downtown Belgrade, on the Zrenjaninski put road which connects Belgrade with the town of Zrenjanin, in Vojvodina. It is built right in the middle of the Pančevački Rit, major floodplain between the rivers of Danube and Tamiš.

== History ==
In the early 20th century, Slovak cattle-breeders from the village of Padina were taking land in Pančevački Rit on lease. As the area was a marshland, to reach their land they had to use flatboats (in Serbian skela), thus giving the name to the area (Padinska Skela = Padina’s Flatboat).

Few short streets in the middle of the large marsh existed prior to 1944. They were sparsely inhabited by the Germans, Ruthenians and Czechs.

The settlement originates from the late 1940s when melioration of Pančevački Rit began. The settlement became important immediately, being in the center of the area which was turned from marshy floodplain into a very fertile arable land for the PKB corporation. While other parts of the country lacked many communal and modern infrastructure, Padinska Skela soon had elementary school, kindergarten, sports clubs, ambulance and cinema. During the period of colonization („The 8th offensive“), it was mostly populated with the settlers from the South Serbia (Vranje, Surdulica), Bosnian Krajina and, to the lesser extent, from the Raška.

It was part of the municipality of Borča until May 30, 1952, when it became seat of its own municipality. In 1955 it merged into the municipality of Krnjača which, in turn, became part of the municipality of Palilula in 1965.

== Demographics ==
Historical population
Year	Pop.	±%
1961	1,579	—
1971	2,409	+52.6%
1981	10,311	+328.0%
1991	10,035	−2.7%
2002	9,836	−2.0%
2011	9,263	−5.8%

Originally the settlement grew slowly, as many smaller settlements were scattered all over the Pančevački Rit, growing around the solitary and outer farms. In the 1970s however, most of those settlements were administratively merged into the central one, Padinska Skela, even though some of them are kilometers away from it and separated by vast fields. As a result of this administrative measures, the population of Padinska Skela apparently boomed, but almost right away began experiencing depopulation. Population of Padinska Skela according to the last official census in 2011 was 9,263.

Ethnic structure (2002): Serbs 88,21%, Romani 4,04%, Macedonians 0,83%, Yugoslavs 0,55%, ethnic Muslims 0,52%, Gorani 0,50%.

The local community of Padinska Skela encompasses two neighboring settlements, Kovilovo and Dunavac. Together they had a combined population of 10,679 in 2011.

== Neighbourhoods ==
Some of sub-settlements of Padinska Skela are far away from it, like Glogonjski Rit, Jabučki Rit, Široka Bara or Vrbovski. In a strange administrative decision, ten times smaller Kovilovo, which almost makes a continuous built-up area with Padinska Skela, is officially classified as a separate settlement. Urban core of Padinska Skela consists of several neighborhoods, like Tovilište, Novo Naselje, Staro Naselje, Srednje Naselje or Industrijsko Naselje.

=== Tovilište ===
One of oldest sections of Padinska Skela, consisting of some 30 concrete buildings of very bad quality, built 1950–1970 for first settlers with PKB's farms in the vicinity of the neighborhoods. The name, tovilište, is Serbian for cattle feeder.

=== Staro Naselje ===
Older section, consisting of some 30 concrete buildings of very bad quality, built 1950–1970. Mostly old warehouses and depots turned into a residential apartments. Today almost exclusively inhabited by the Roma people. The name means Old Settlement in Serbian.

=== Srednje Naselje ===
Consists of some 15 five-store buildings built 1974–1978. The name means Middle Settlement in Serbian.

=== Novo Naselje ===
The largest neighborhood, with some 50 buildings mostly built in the 1980s, with some constructed in the 2000s. The name means New Settlement in Serbian.

=== Industrijsko Naselje ===
Location of the PKB's dairy branch, IMLEK factory for milk production. The name means "Industrial Settlement" in Serbian.

=== Široka Greda ===
Located near the "Rasova" canal.

== Characteristics ==
Padinska Skela is still statistically classified as a rural settlement (village). It covers and area of 6,500 hectares.

For the Belgraders, Padinska Skela gained a certain level of notoriety as it is a location of both Special psychiatric hospital Dr Laza Lazarević and one of the major correctional facilities in Serbia, the Padinska Skela prison. Settlements nickname, Padinjak, is used for both institutions in colloquial conversation.

Agricultural PKB high school, with the adjoining students' home, was opened in 1965. А sports and agricultural Lisičji Jarak Airport is located near Padinska Skela, so as a modern BG Sport and Olympic Centre in the nearby Kovilovo, opened in 2005.

Near Padinska Skela, 15 km (9.3 mi) along the Zrenjaninski put, there is a large, unfenced hunting ground of Rit. It covers an area of 82.63 km^{2} (31.90 sq mi), of which 0.5 km^{2} (0.19 sq mi) is a pheasantry. Animals bred in the facility include roe deer, hare, quail, mallard, greylag goose and 13,000 pheasants per year.

The Vizelj stream, in its upper course, flows through the settlement for 6 kilometres (3.7 mi). In 2021, Vizelj was dredged and cleaned from reeds in part of this section, which resulted in return of wildlife, including ducks and swans. In 2022, construction of the promenade along the Vizelj in Padinska Skela was announced.
