= Al Dahra Agricultural Company =

Agribusiness firm

Al Dahra Agricultural Company شركة الظاهرة الزراعية
- Al Dahra Holding Logo
- Type: Privately Held
- Industry: Agricultural industry
- Founded: 1995
- Headquarters: Abu Dhabi, United Arab Emirates
- Key people: H-E Khadim A Al Derei, Vice Chairman
- Products: Human Food & Animal Feed
- Services: Production and trading of animal feed and essential human food commodities
- Number of employees: 1,001–5,000 employees
- Parent: Alain International Group

Al Dahra Agricultural Company (Arabic: شركة الظاهرة الزراعية) is an agribusiness firm specializing in the cultivation, production, and trading of animal feed and human food commodities such as rice, flour, fruits and vegetables. The group owns and operates a land bank of 200 thousand acres, 8 forage pressing and production plants, 4 rice milling plants, and 2 flour milling plants.

== Structure ==
The company has more than 20 distribution sites in the UAE and is currently importing from multiple countries, including the United States, Spain, Italy, Poland, Canada, and Pakistan. In addition, the company owns factories and farms in the United States.

Al-Dahra Agriculture Company consists of the following branches:

- Al-Dahra Agricultural company in the United Arab Emirates
  - Animal production branch
  - Plant product branch
  - Animal and plant production branch
  - Alfalfa product project
- Al-Dahra Agriculture company in Egypt
  - Navigator company
  - Emirates International Company
- Al-Dahra Agriculture company in Pakistan

In 2019, Al Dahra acquired Serbia-based agricultural company Poljoprivredna Korporacija Beograd (PKB). Following the acquisition, Al Dahra announced it would build 10 biogas plants of 999 kW each in Belgrade.

In November 2020, the company signed a deal with the Israeli Watergen company to sell water-from-air units to the region.

== See also ==
- Abu Dhabi Developmental Holding Company (ADQ)
