= Vizelj =

Vizelj Визељ

Location
- Country: Serbia

Physical characteristics
- Source
  - location: north of Padinska Skela, Serbia
- Mouth
  - location: Danube, at Krnjača, Serbia
  - coordinates: 44.833917°N 20.470393°E
- Length: 31 km (19 mi)

Basin features
- Progression: Danube→ Black Sea

The Vizelj (Serbian: Визељ) is a short channeled river in north-central Serbia, the left tributary to the Danube. During its entire flow it runs through the suburban section of Belgrade, on the territory of municipality of Palilula.

== Course ==
Vizelj originates north of Padinska Skela, in the central part of the Pančevački Rit, a former marshland in the southwestern corner of the Banat region. It forms at the Livade locality, and first flows to the west, where in the Puškara region receives the Sefkerin canal from the right. At the Carske Šume locality, also from the right, it receives the Buk canal. The Buk connects Vizelj to Besni Fok, and the Kišvara canal in the west. From there, the Vizelj generally flows in the north-to-south direction, creating numerous curves and meanders. In this, upper course, it mostly follows the Zrenjanin Road, between the localities of Nove Livade, on the east, and Galina Greda and Zlobatska Bara, on the west.

It enters Padinska Skela at the Institute for Agriculture and Forestry, and flows between Skela's neighborhoods of Novo Naselje (on the right), and Tovilište and aviation complex Lisičji Jarak (on the left). Upon exiting Padinska Skela, at the PKB Corporation industrial complex, it receives the stream of Lisičji Potok from the left. From this point it meanders to the west, splitting from the road. It flows through Kovilovo, where it receives the Rasova canal from the right, and continues to the south through the Zbeg region. In this section, it is crossed by the Outer Northern Tangent, which is in wider sense a northern section of the Belgrade bypass. Before reaching Borča, it forms a large meander, creating the Veliki Budžak locality.

The Vizelj continues to meander in the east–west direction, marking, for the most part, west and southwest border of the urbanized area of Borča, more specifically its neighborhoods of Mali Zbeg, Nova Borča (Centar 3) and Stara Borča. Irgot, section of Stara Borča, is fully situated in the joint meander of Vizelj and Mokri Sebeš, which flows from the left. The Vizelj continues to the south, where it receives the Veliki (Great) canal from the right. Borča expands in this section, and the area is being urbanized in the direction of Crvenka, outer and isolated neighborhood of Borča on the Danube's bank. The canal then crosses the embankment which protects the Pančevački Rit's inland from the Danube and turns to the southeast, parallel to the embankment.

In this, final section, the Vizelj makes an administrative border between the towns of Borča and Belgrade, or Belgrade's neighborhood of Krnjača. It also forms the eastern border of the ada Kožara, which is planned, with the surrounding area, as the future, much larger, artificial Čaplja island. This final section is also known as the Borčanski Dunavac, or, more commonly Jojkićev Dunavac, after Đurica Jojkić, former mayor of Belgrade. During his tenure, this section was channeled and widened in an effort to quicken the drainage of the Pančevački Rit. It empties into the Danube at its 1,168.5 km (726.1 mi). Weekend settlement Mika Alas is located at the confluence.

== Characteristics ==
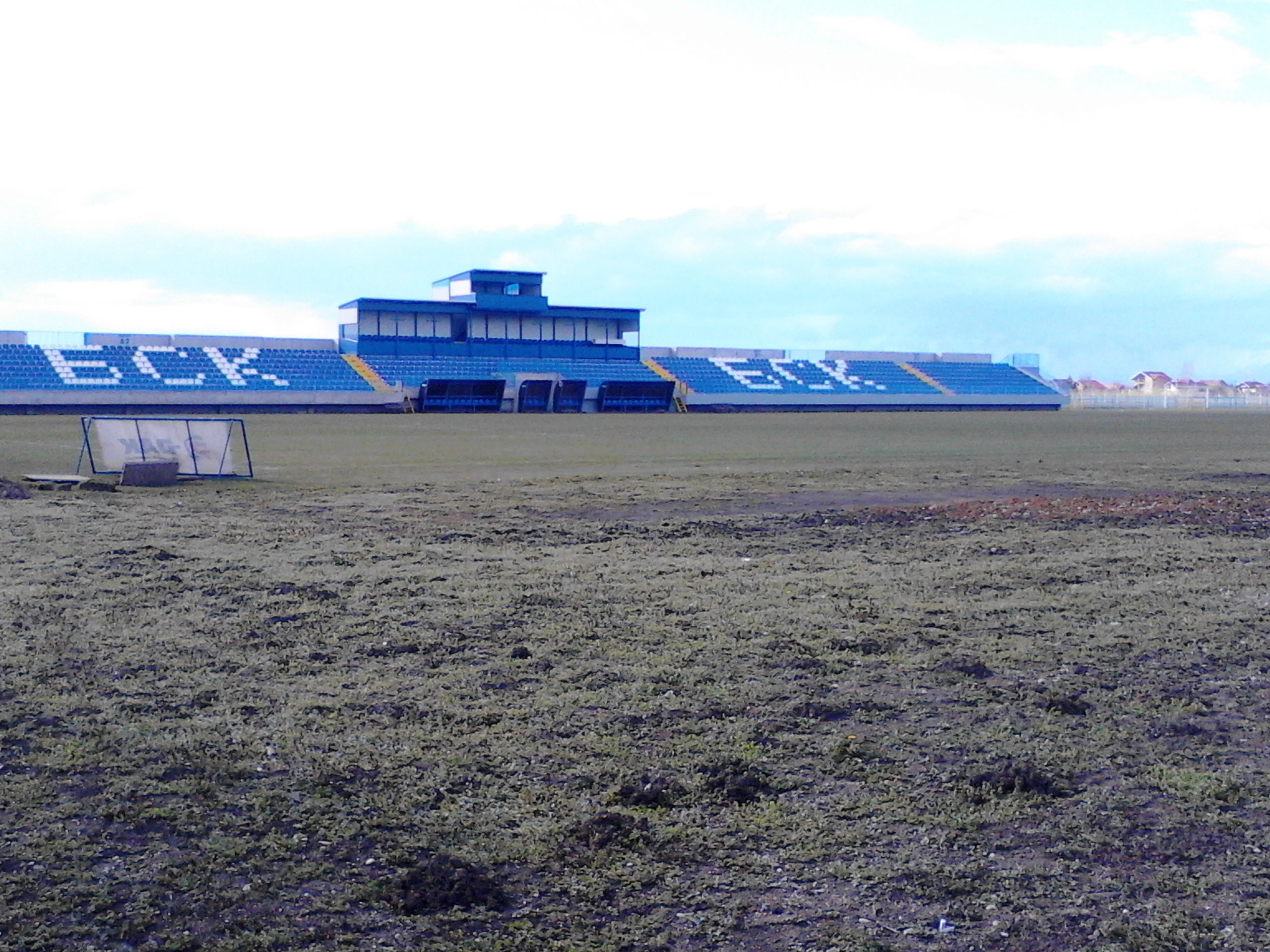
Vizelj Park, in the vicinity of the river

The length of the Vizelj, due to the channeling and artificial connections with the surrounding channels, has been reported as either 27 km (17 mi) or 31 km (19 mi). The average width of the stream is 50 m (160 ft) and is 1.5 to 2 m (4 ft 11 in to 6 ft 7 in) deep.

Jojkićev Dunavac, which makes the final section of the stream, is actually a 6 km (3.7 mi) long canal, cut in the 1950s to drain the soil. In Borča, there is a pumping station which transfers the water from this stream into the Mokri Sebeš. When dug in the 1950s, the canal was 70 metres (230 ft) wide. In time, due to the mud and silt deposits, in some sections it is narrowed to only 7 metres (23 ft).

During the normal and high water levels, smaller vessels can enter the channel, but during the low waters it is inaccessible. However, it is used for kayaking since 1972, when the first kayak club in Borča was founded.

Vizelj is name of the PKB Corporation's pig farm. Also, a new stadium of the FK BSK Borča, built in the vicinity of the river in 2009, is named Vizelj Park.

== Human history ==
Initial works on the river were done in the second half of the 18th century, during the reign of the empress Maria Theresa, as the area was ruled by Austria at the time. In the mid-20th century, the Vizelj was navigable for smaller vessels. The navigable waterway was starting at Vrbovski, and continued until Reva, where it reached the Danube. In the early 1960s, with the digging of the Jojkićev Dunavac, the stream was cut short and got its present form. As the area became rapidly urbanized after the World War II, which was not followed by the adequate communal infrastructure, the Vizelj got more and more polluted.

It was partially cleaned in 2009. In 2012, sisters Nikolina Moldovan and Olivera Moldovan, who practiced on the Vizelj, petitioned to the mayor Dragan Đilas to do something about the worsening conditions of the river as it is important for the national sport. The city decided to financially support the cleaning, though that is not administratively under the city's jurisdiction. In August–September 2012, the stream was dredged, cleaned and the vegetation was cut. Yearly kayaking regattas have been organized since then. In 2014, the channel was cleaned again but by May 2015 it was again covered in vegetation and turned into the morass. The river was cleaned during the summer of 2015. Since then, locals and members of the kayaк clubs organized and regularly clean the stream, including the cleaning of the banks in April 2017.

In March 2019, the environmentalists described the Vizelj as "less of a watercourse, more of a sewage watershed". Some cleaning of the canal was conducted after the floods in 2019. In 2022, construction of the promenade along the Vizelj in Padinska Skela was announced.

== Wildlife ==
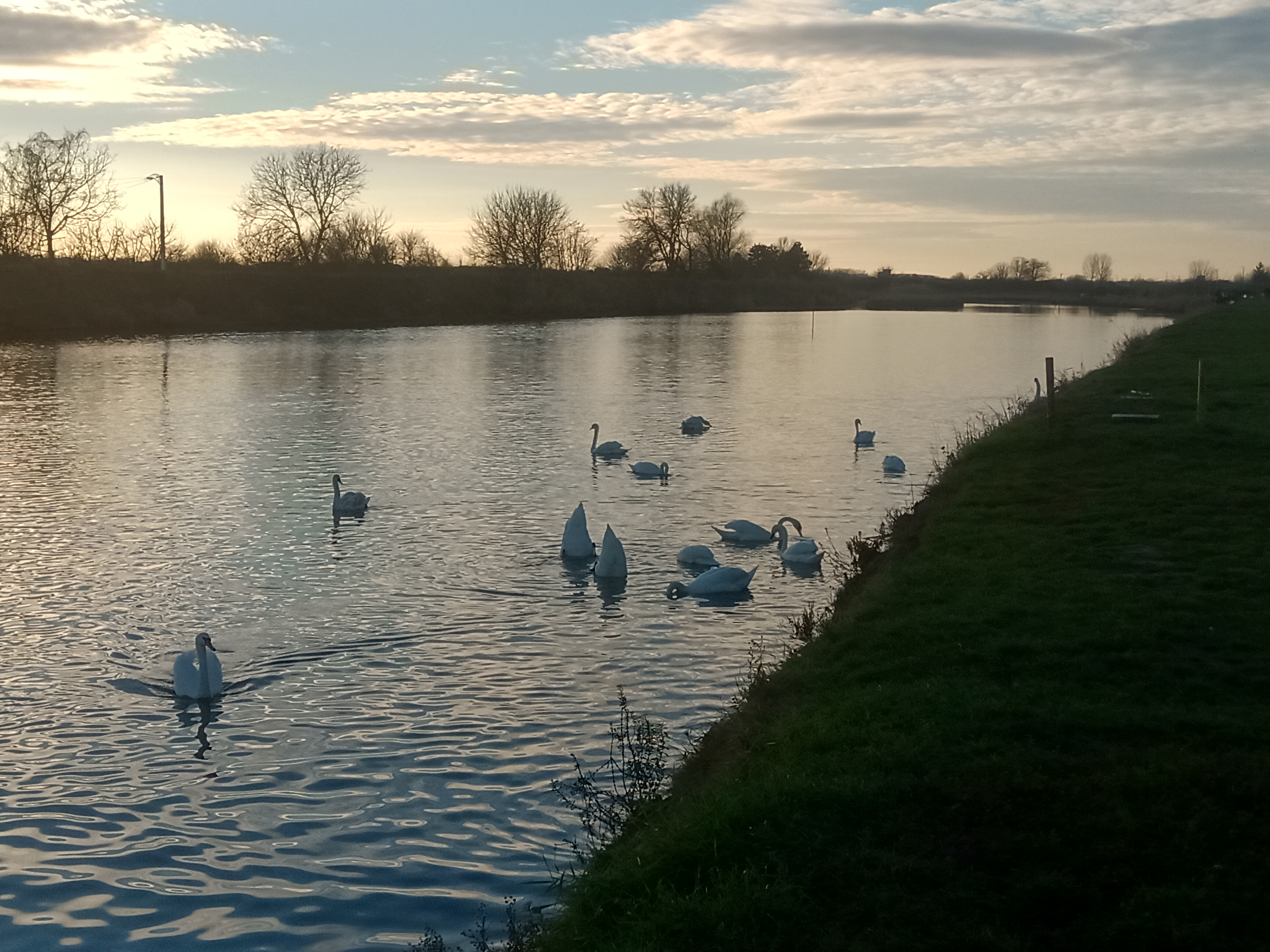
A bevy of swans on the Vizelj near Borča

In April 2014, during the repair of the waste water collector, toxic substances were poured into the river which caused a massive fish kill. In August 2014, the PKB Corporation apparently discharged large amounts of ammonia into the Vizelj which nearly killed the entire fish population. Despite the pollution, the river is popular among the fishermen, but the recreational fishing is occasionally forbidden on the parts of the course, as it was in 2016 for 600 m (2,000 ft), between river's 3rd and 4th kilometer.

In the autumn of 2010 a flock of 30 swans landed on the Vizelj and have been coming every year since then, and the number of swans doubled. They became a local attraction. However, the area was plagued by the avian influenza in January 2017, which killed almost 40 swans. Further deaths of dozens of swans from avian influenza were recorded in 2021, 2022, and 2023. As in 2023 the isolated strains included those which are almost 100% fatal for poultry, and can be transferred to mammals and humans, the contagion zone was declared around the stream in October 2023, 10 km (6.2 mi) from the outbreak point, and 3 km (1.9 mi) wide.

By 2020, the communal services which cut the poplars in the surrounding fields, left the cut trees and debris which clogged the final section, cutting it off from the Danube, and turning Jojkićev Dunavac into the bog. As a result, the water turned black and dying of fish, swans and ducks continued. In 2021, the river was dredged and cleaned from reeds in its upped course, through Padinska Skela. As in this section the river is still not polluted, and majority of settlement has a proper sewage system in this area, this was enough for wildlife, including ducks and swans, to return.

== Glutin complex ==
Glutin industrial complex is located in the Padinska Skela Industrial Zone, along the promenade on the Vizelj's bank. The state-owned factory was processing dead animals and animal waste, tanning leather and producing animal glue. Due to the bad conditions in the company, workers began to strike in 2005 and the processing of the waste completely stopped. In 2012, the government donated money to the company so that it could process the enlarging amount of the waste, but the strike was only radicalized in 2012 and 2013. The Gluten went bankrupt and was officially closed.

During the inspections of the gradually ruining complex in February 2019 by the ecologists and reporters, over 300 tons of fossilized animal carcasses and bare bones were found. Additionally, mazut, the tanning fluids and various other unidentified chemicals are spilled over within the complex. There is also numerous hardened and crystallized waste, all left to the elements in the open. The ground was soaked by the large amount of toxic waste, while the animal remains are scattered by the stray dogs, jackals and foxes. The area is full of fumes and "unbearable stench".

The central collector pool for the waste waters from the PKB company is still operational within the complex. PKB's tank trucks pour the waste into the collector, from where it goes directly, unfiltered, into the Vizelj. The Glutin has been described as an ecological bomb and the "Sword of Damocles of the Pančevački Rit". The proposed solutions by the ecologists include the incineration of the waste in the furnaces of the cement factory in Beočin. Problem is deepened by the fact that the owner of the lot on which the waste is located is unclear, even in the official cadastre books. Also, all government ministries and agencies claim that the problem is not under their jurisdiction.

The complex covers an area of 330 a (360,000 sq ft) and is 500 m (1,600 ft) away from the urbanized area of Padinska Skela. It is used as the shooting range by the airsoft teams, while the bones are collected for the filming of musical and video clips, etc.

Since none of the institutions accepted the responsibility for the problem, city administration in the end organized the removal of the waste which began in July 2019. It is being transported to the "Proteinka" factory in Sombor for treatment. Due to the distance (Sombor is 150 km (93 mi) away from Belgrade) and the specificities of the waste treatment, only one truck weekly will transport the bones, so it is planned for the process to lasts for several months. The transport was intensified and the bones were completely removed by the end of August 2019.
