= Sava Kovačević (disambiguation) =

Sava Kovačević (1905–1943) was a Yugoslav Partisan World War II commander.

Sava Kovačević may also refer to:

- Sava Kovačević, Zemun, an urban neighborhood of Belgrade, capital of Serbia, in the municipality of Zemun
- Blok Sava Kovačević, an urban neighborhood of Belgrade, capital of Serbia, in the municipality of Palilula
