= Jelena Marjanović =

Serbian singer (1983–2016)

- Јелена Марјановић
- Born: Jelena Krsmanović; August 29, 1983; Bekova, SR Serbia, Yugoslavia
- Died: April 2, 2016 (aged 32); Crvenka, Belgrade, Serbia
- Cause of death: Blunt force trauma
- Musical career
- Genres: Pop, folk
- Instrument: Voice

Jelena Marjanović (née Krsmanović; Serbian Cyrillic: Јелена Марјановић, née Крсмановић; 29 August, 1983 – 2 April, 2016) was a Serbian pop-folk singer. Her 2016 murder, which remains unsolved, has been the subject of much media attention in Serbia.

== Biography ==
=== Early life ===
Jelena Krsmanović was born 29 August, 1983, in the village of Bekova, SR Serbia, SFR Yugoslavia to Dušan and Zorica Krsmanović. The family later moved to Belgrade, where Jelena attended Rade Drainac elementary school in Borča. At the age of 13, she appeared on the reality television singing competition Zvezde Granda, becoming the show's youngest winner and earning a record deal with Grand Production.

=== Death and aftermath ===
On April 2, 2016, Jelena was on a walk with her husband, Zoran, and her 5-year-old daughter, Jana, along the Danube in the Crvenka neighborhood of northern Belgrade. Zoran claimed that he and Jana were walking towards Jelena when she ran out of their view sometime between 3:00 and 4:00 pm. According to Zoran, the family would visit the area almost every day so that Jelena could jog while Jana played in the meadow. At approximately 8:00 pm, Zoran reported Jelena's disappearance to the police and the search for her began. The next day, on April 3, 2016, authorities recovered Jelena's sweatshirt, sneakers, cell phone, and traces of blood around 5:00 am. A few hours later, around noon, Jelena's body was found in an embankment near the canal.

An autopsy found that Jelena died as a result of blunt force trauma to the head from a metal object. It was noted that many of the blows occurred while Jelena had her back to the killer and was attempting to flee. She suffered facial bruises as well as abrasions to her hands and arms, which could have been the result of her falling or being dragged through vegetation. Jelena also suffered two stab wounds: one to the back of the head, and one to the right elbow. She survived for an unknown period of time, as evidenced by water in her lungs she ingested from the canal where her body was left. The killer forcibly removed the sweatshirt of her tracksuit at some point during the attack.

Zoran was initially detained, but released after passing a polygraph during questioning. On September 15, 2017, Zoran was arrested and remained in custody until June 12, 2018, when an appellate court ordered for his release.

On July 22, 2022, Zoran was found guilty of Jelena's murder and sentenced to 40 years in prison. On October 2, 2023, Zoran was released from prison after successfully appealing his sentence. On December 25, 2023, his conviction was overturned by the Court of Appeal on procedural issues. His retrial began April 9, 2025.

== Discography ==
=== Albums ===
- Ti gubiš (2000)
- Mangupe (2002)
