= Čaplja =

Coordinates: 44.846726°N 20.446852°E

Čaplja (Serbian Cyrillic: Чапља) is a projected river island (ada) in Serbia, on the left bank of the Danube. According to the General Urbanistic Plan (GUP) of Belgrade, it will be formed in Belgrade's municipality of Palilula.

== Location ==
The area designated for the future island is located in the Banat section of the municipality of Palilula between the Danube and the Jojkićev Dunavac canal, ending section of the Vizelj stream in Pančevački Rit (Jojkić's Little Danube, named so after the former mayor of Belgrade, Đurica Jojkić) on the east, and the weekend settlement of Crvenka on the west.

At present, the designated area has two major sections: eastern and smaller one is a small island of Kožara on the Jojkićev Dunavac's mouth into the Danube, and western and much larger floodplain between the Danube and the embankment which protects the inner areas of Pančevački Rit (Krnjača, Crvenka). The area is floodable, thickly forested, uninhabited (that is, without permanent population) and densely crisscrossed by the elongated bogs and slow streams.

== Name ==
Except for the island of Kožara, the major part of the area has no name of its own though it used to be called Crvenka, just like the modern weekend settlement. City government proposed temporary name of čaplja, which is Serbian for heron. It is decided that each project, proposed to the city government for the future island, should also propose a name for it.

== Formation ==
The projected area of the island is 5.82 km^{2} (2.25 sq mi), which is twice as large as Ada Ciganlija and three times larger than Veliko Ratno Ostrvo. The formation should be achieved by digging a canal along the existing embankment, which would turn the wetland into a real island. Though some articles already nicknamed it the twin island of Veliko Ratno Ostrvo (which is 800 m (2,600 ft) away), Čaplja is going to be almost three times larger in area, differently shaped, it will not have any land of bridge connection to each other, and unlike Veliko Ratno Ostrvo which is protected by the law and any human interference is prohibited, future island is projected as the major tourist and recreational attraction.

It is intended to keep and protect the existing autochthonous vegetation, wetland and marshy ecosystems. Also, the forests should be repopulated by the natural species of trees that grow in these areas, and even the existing poplar plantations will be replaced by the native sorts of trees. It is also projected to keep the vegetation in the widest possible range, so the present view of the left bank of the Danube should stay intact. When the construction of the leisure facilities is all done, it is expected not to cover more than a 40% of the island, while 60% will remain intact natural environment.

== Function ==
The recreational complex is envisioned for the use during entire year. The canal which will separate it from the embankment will be navigable and used for nautical sports. Across the embankment, a 100 ha (250 acres) large golf terrains are projected, so as a marina which will connect the island to the ports in Belgrade (600 m (2,000 ft) away) and Zemun. Also, a road connection to the road of Zrenjaninski put will be constructed.

As the future island is still just a vision of the city government, and no accepted plan or a project for it does exist, it is only revealed that facilities on the island will comprise an aqua park.

== Current status ==
City government of the Democratic Party, apart from envisioning it in 2003, didn't do anything to push the project. After the 2013 change, when Serbian Progressive Party took over the Belgrade's government, they completely turned to the Belgrade Waterfront project on the Sava river, apparently putting the Čaplja project at hold by 2017, if not abandoning it completely.

== Sources ==
- Generalni plan Beograda 2021, page 259
- Projekat “Čaplja” - rečni park Dunava na Novoj adi u Beogradu
- Project “Heron” - Danube river park and the new river island in Belgrade
