= Reva, Belgrade =

Urban neighborhood of Belgrade, Serbia

Coordinates: 44°51′N 20°32′E

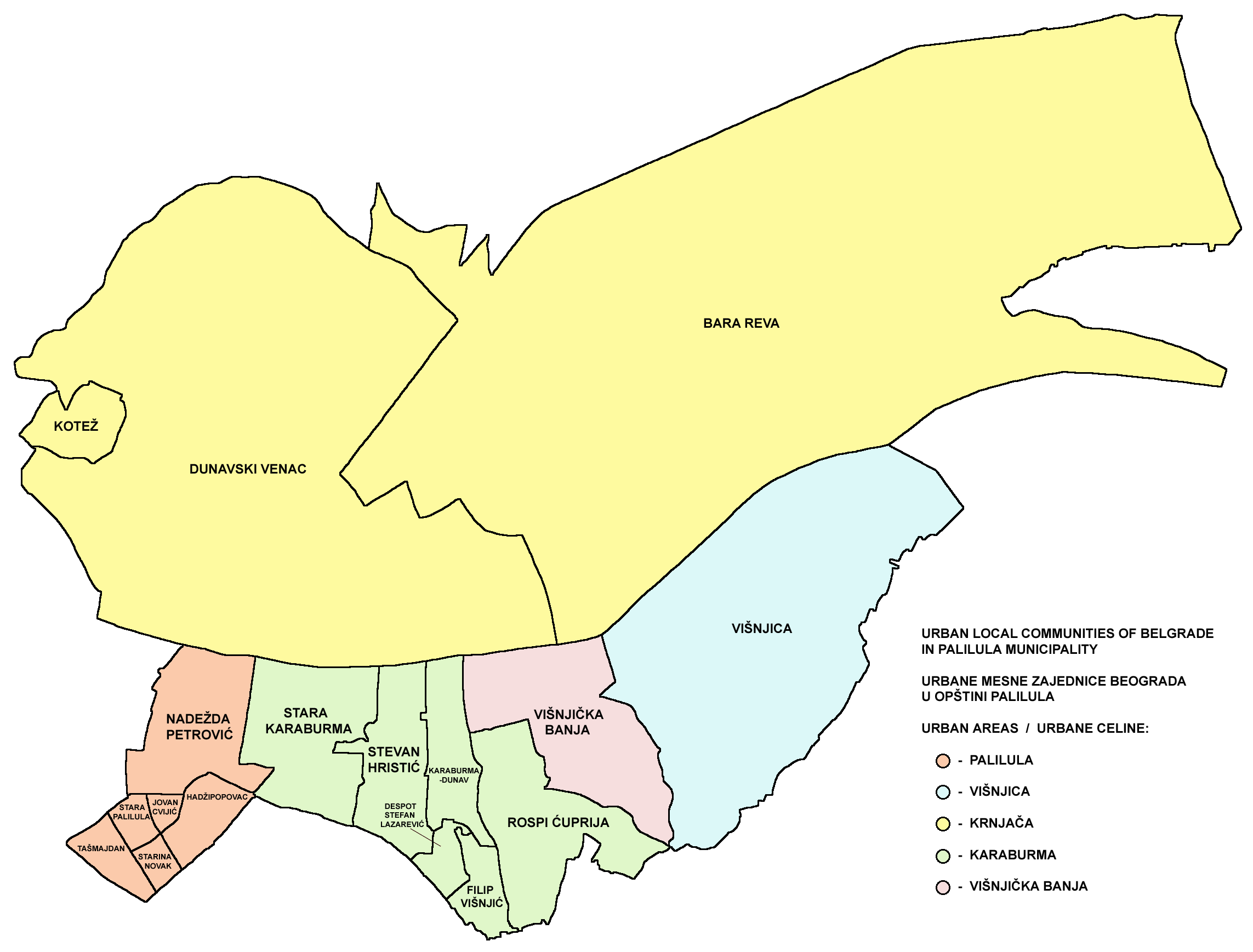
Map of Urban local communities of Belgrade in Palilula municipality

Reva (Serbian: Рева) is an urban neighborhood of Belgrade, the capital of Serbia. It is a sub-neighborhood of Krnjača and is located in Belgrade's municipality of Palilula. According to the 2011 census, it had a population of 2,522.

== Location ==
Reva is located in the Banat section of the municipality of Palilula. It is situated between the Krnjača's sub-neighborhoods Blok Zaga Malivuk and Janko Lisjak on the west and Blok Braća Marić on the southwest, Ovča on the north, Pančevo on the east and the Danube on the south.

It mostly stretches along the road of Pančevački put, which connects Belgrade to the town of Pančevo in the east.

It occupies the entire eastern section of Krnjača, larger in territory than the western sections (Dunavski Venac and Kotež), but much less populated.

== Geography ==
It is situated in the southeast section of the Pančevački Rit floodplain, between the Danube and Tamiš rivers. Remnants of the floodplain include the bogs of Veliko Blato, just west of the neighborhood and Reva, so as numerous minor, mostly channeled flows which drain the land and empty into the Danube: Sebeš, Kalovita, Dunavac, Sibnica, Velika Vrtača, Mala Vrtača, Spoljni Kanal, etc.

The entire left bank of the Danube is an embankment, built to protect the land from flooding. Former adas, river islands, have been turned into the embankments and are now part of the land, like Ovčanska Ada, Čapljin, etc. The mostly un-urbanized eastern part consists of fields Ovča Greda, Široki Rit, Vrtače, Crkvište, Veliko Blato. Unrelated to the bog of the same name on the west, Veliko Blato is partially urbanized, as the settlement of Sibnica is located here.

=== Bog ===
Reva Bog (Serbian: Бара Рева) is located close to the Danube's left bank, in marshy and floodprone terrain. Part of it has been turned into a fish pond. It is elongated in the west-to-east direction, parallel to the flow of the Sebeš stream. With other marshy areas in Krnjača it is the major breeding ground for the mosquitoes which causes annoyance for the population of Belgrade during summer.

Reva is a habitat for some 120 bird species, some of which are endangered in Serbia, including the white-tailed eagle. Other birds include mute swan, great crested grebe, little grebe and Eurasian coot. Otters are occasionally spotted, so as deer.

== Neighborhood ==
Reva is one of the sub-neighborhoods of Krnjača. The settlement is scattered and consists of several discontinued built-up areas. Blok Zaga Malivuk, Reva and Reva 2 are located in the western section, along the Pančevački put, and are proper extension of Krnjača. Ovčanski Sebeš is separated to the north, across the Sebeš stream, on the railway in Ovča direction. Čapljin is a weekend-settlement on the Danube, on the former island of the same name. It is located right across another weekend-settlement, Bela Stena, on western tip of the Forkontumac island, which is administratively part of Pančevo. Sub-neighborhood of Sibnica is located in the easternmost section, close to the Tamiš river and town of Pančevo itself.

== Administration ==
Historical population
Year	Pop.	±%
1981	1,578	—
1991	1,963	+24.4%
2002	2,808	+43.0%
2011	2,522	−10.2%

Reva is organized as a local community, sub-municipal administrative unit, within the municipality of Palilula. The local community was called Reva until the 2002 census, while for the 2011 census it was renamed Bara Reva.

== Economy ==
Reva is primarily industrial and economic zone. Industry includes numerous facilities of the formerly large, state owned companies many of which went bankrupt during the transition period and are now turned into the large hangars and storage facilities. Companies include: Trudbenik Gradnja, IMK Beograd, Jugonemija, Oil Refinery Belgrade, Ovča gass filling facility, Veterinarian Institute, etc. It is also known for its nursery gardens (Rasadnik Reva, and other).

The road of Pančevački put, which starts at the Pančevo Bridge, passed right through the neighborhood. The Belgrade-Pančevo Railway marks the northern border of the neighborhood and separates it from Ovča. There are railway stations in Ovčanski Sebeš and Ovča.

=== Reva Industrial Zone ===
In 2018 it was announced that Reva is to be included in the future Belgrade port area, since the present Port of Belgrade, located across the Danube in the neighborhood of Viline Vode, is scheduled for relocation. For now, Reva is envisioned as the temporary location for the numerous gravel loading facilities from the banks in downtown Belgrade on both the Danube and Sava rivers, which should be relocated, too. The starting date for the beginning of the removal is set for April 2018, the detailed regulatory plan for the new port area should be finished sometime in 2018, while the technical documentation for the future bulk cargo terminal should be prepared in 2019.

The Reva section was to cover 56 hectares (140 acres), and was planned to employ 770 people by 2020. However, nothing has been done, and in November 2020 preparation for the facility for the treatment of the construction waste was announced instead. The location of the landfill for the waste and the mobile facility was set along the embankment, 500 metres (1,600 ft) away from the Danube's bank. The area planned for filling with the waste was enlarged to 62 hectares (150 acres), and was planned to last for five years. City stated that the land has to be filled and elevated first, claiming that "Gradska Čistoća", city's communal waste management company, is the investor. The temporary permit was issued on 12 January 2021.

Ecologists protested at the time, as the marshy area is home to numerous bird species. Initial waste dumping began already in 2019, but the active filling of the marsh with the waste began in December 2020, even before the temporary permit. The area has been filled for months, before coming into the public spotlight in May 2021, when it sparked a strong public reaction. Residents reported that forests had been destroyed and constant inflow of various privately owned trucks, not only those of "Gradska Čistoća", which were dumping the waste into the marshland. Environmentalists noted that the facility itself wasn't the problem, but the location, and pointed out that city failed to provide any documentation or survey which proves that the waste is non-hazardous.

Protesters organized camps on location, preventing physically dumping of the waste. One group collected some garbage and unloaded it in front of the city hall. As the cutting of the forest in the area is officially forbidden, the trees have been buried and taken down under the layers of waste, which reached up to 8 metres (26 ft). Actress Svetlana Bojković became the symbol of the protests after a video of her physically preventing a truck to unload the waste. Protesters partially re-forested the filled area with seedlings of black locust and called for the legal protection of Reva as a nature's reserve.

City officials originally refused to comment. As the protest progressed, they stated that the area is not protected anyway, and that all necessary permits were obtained. City administration invoked its 2018 detailed regulatory plan "to which there were no citizens' objections", and 1977 "certain recommendations" by the Institute "Jaroslav Černi", that his part of Reva might serve this purpose. They also said the guidelines were issued to the waste collectors what to do in case they encounter eagles's nests. City's secretary for urbanism, Bojana Radaković, said that she personally issued the temporary permit and that she is well informed on the subject. However, she took over the office on 9 January 2021, and only three days later signed the permit.

On 30 May 2021, deputy mayor Goran Vesić announced that filling will stop. City constantly referred to Reva as "temporary landfill" which existed for decades, but it was an illegal, unregulated junkyard, while, as evident on the photos, the area was still largely a green area before the spring of 2021. It was added that the new location will be selected. However, later in June, city confirmed that Reva remains one of three locations for construction waste treatment, the other two being Slanci and Umka. It was stated that Reva will be a temporary storage for the waste, not a proper landfill. Eco-activists declared a victory, calling for the criminal responsibility for those who allowed the destruction of the green areas.

In February 2023, city placed 38 ha (94 acres) of land in Reva under the mortgage, as a warranty for the large, and still amounting, debts of the municipal communal company in Lazarevac. As Lazarevac is nowhere near Reva, city's withholding of all financial data regarding the issue, the company already being salvaged few times and being owned by its own municipality and not by the city, and absence of practice that one organ of the state places mortgages to warrant for another one, the opposition accused city government of planned corruption. Additionally, the land in question is highly valuable, being located where access roads between the Belgrade bypass and the planned Ada Huja bridge are projected. Activating warranty would allow for the land to be sold for only 60% of its estimated value.
