= Sava Kovačević, Zemun =

Coordinates: 44°50′38″N 20°23′30″E

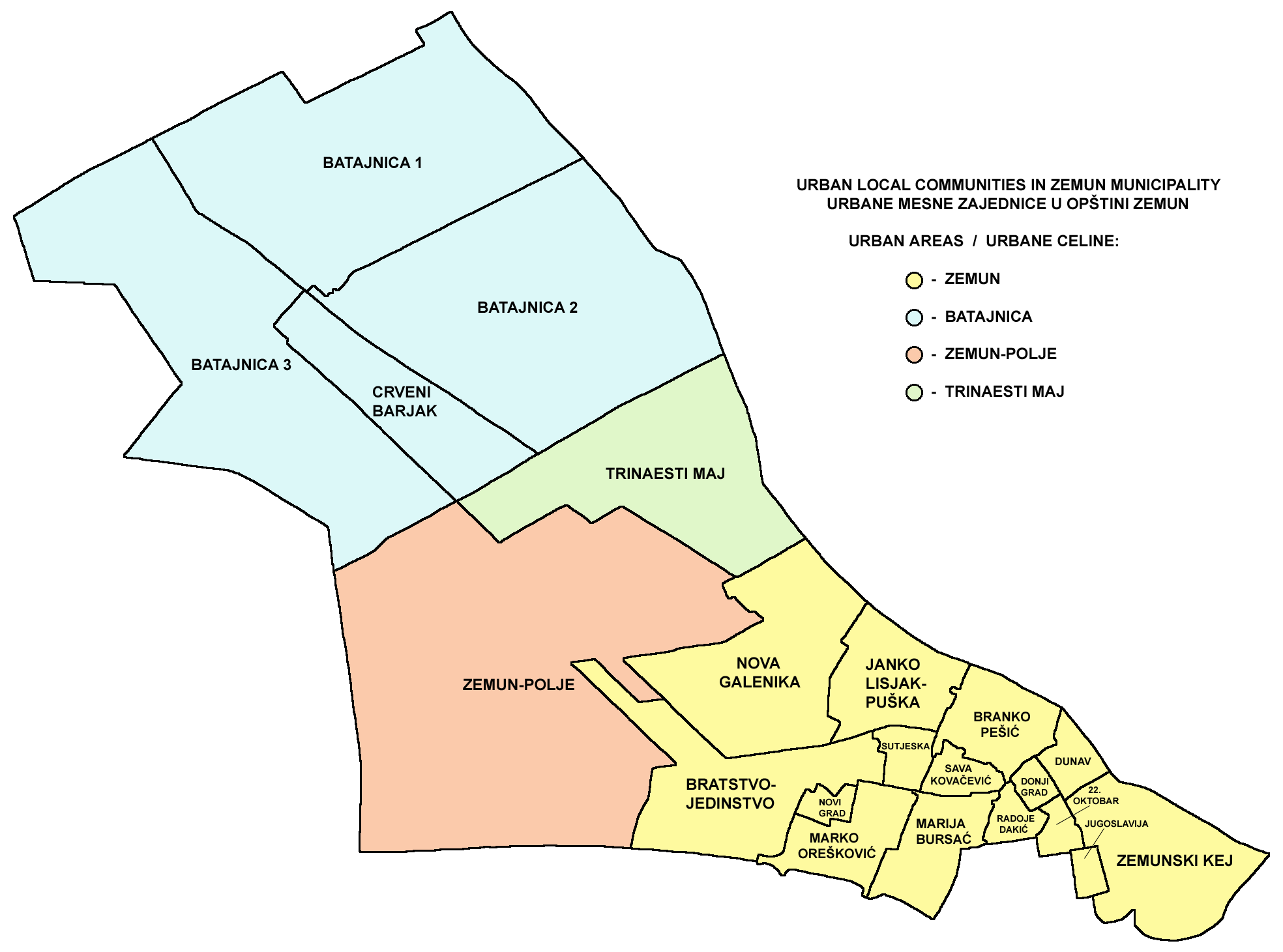
Map of Urban local communities in Zemun municipality

Sava Kovačević (Serbian Cyrillic: Сава Ковачевић) is an urban neighborhood of Belgrade, Serbia. It is located in Belgrade's municipality of Zemun.

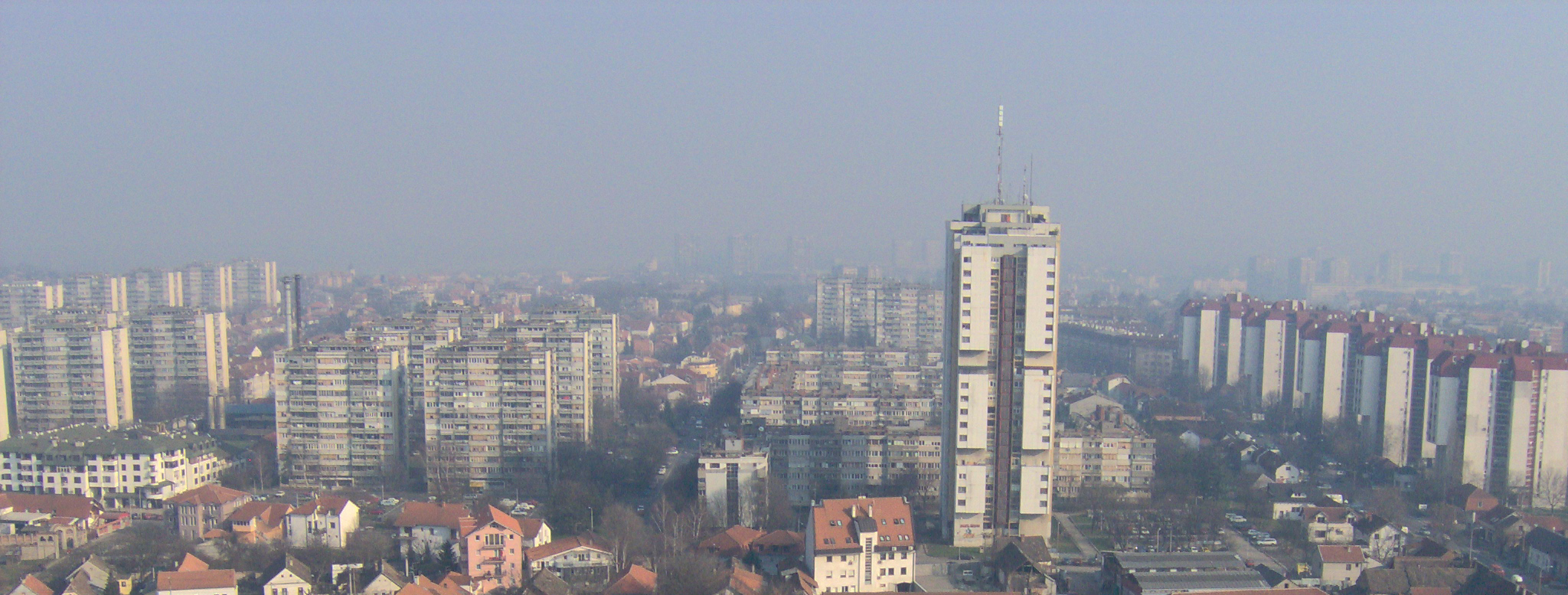
Sava Kovačević (Zemun)

== Location ==
The neighborhood of Sava Kovačević is located in the central part of the urban Zemun. Its perimeter is defined by the streets Dragana rakica (north), Sava kovacevica (east), Prvomajska (south) and Dragana rakica (west). It also includes skycrapers in Ohridska. It borders the neighborhoods of Gornji Grad to the north, Sutjeska to the west and Kalvarija to the south.

== History ==
Franstal, a settlement predominantly inhabited by the ethnic Germans (Volksdeutsche), occupied part of what is today Sava Kovačević. Germans had their cemetery south of the settlement. After World War II the Germans left. Their cemetery was demolished and one of the major hospitals in Belgrade, the KBC Bežanijska Kosa was built on its location.

== Characteristics ==
Sava Kovačević is a residential neighborhood, with a population of 12,374 according to the 2002 census of population. A heating plant is located in the neighborhood.

It was named after the very popular Yugoslav Partisan World War II war hero Sava Kovačević (1905–43). Back-to-back neighborhoods of Blok Sutjeska and Blok Sava Kovačević also exist in another Belgrade's neighborhood of Krnjača, in the municipality of Palilula.
