= Sebeš =

Sebeš Себеш
- suburban settlement
- Location within Serbia
- Coordinates: 44°51′N 20°31′E
- Country: Serbia
- Time zone: UTC+1 (CET)
  - Summer (DST): UTC+2 (CEST)

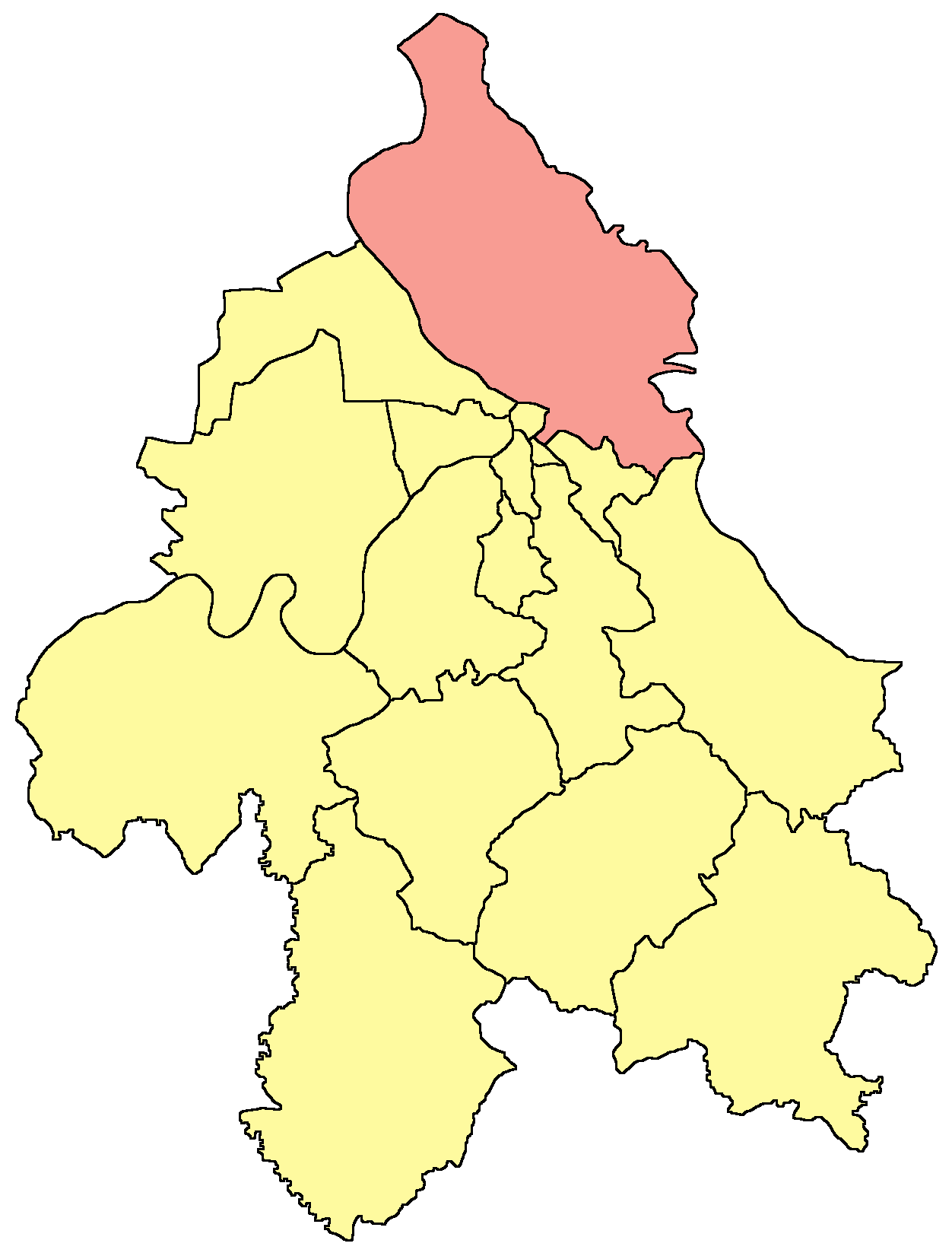
{PPPalilula municipality in Belgrade, Serbia

Sebeš (Serbian Cyrillic: Себеш) is a river, bog and a suburban settlement of Belgrade, the capital of Serbia. All three are located in the Belgrade's municipality of Palilula.

== River ==
Sebeš or Mokri Sebeš (Serbian Cyrillic: Мокри Себеш) is a system of slow canals in the marshes of the lower Pančevački Rit. It originates south of Borča and flows to the east, curving north of Kotež, bog of Veliko Blato, eastern Krnjača and bogs of Sebeš and Reva, before it empties into the Danube as its left tributary. Sebeš is one of the most popular fishing places for the population of Belgrade. It was named after the Hungarian landowner who owned the lands in this area, while mokri is Serbian for wet.

== Bog ==
Sebeš is a bog in the southern part of Pančevački Rit.

== Settlement ==
Sebeš or Ovčanski Sebeš (Serbian Cyrillic: Овчански Себеш) is a southern sub-settlement of Ovča, located on Mokri Sebeš, some 9 kilometers northeast from downtown Belgrade and 4 kilometers away from Ovča. It is a railway station on the Belgrade-Pančevo railroad
