= Kovilovo =

Coordinates: 44°54′28″N 20°25′43″E

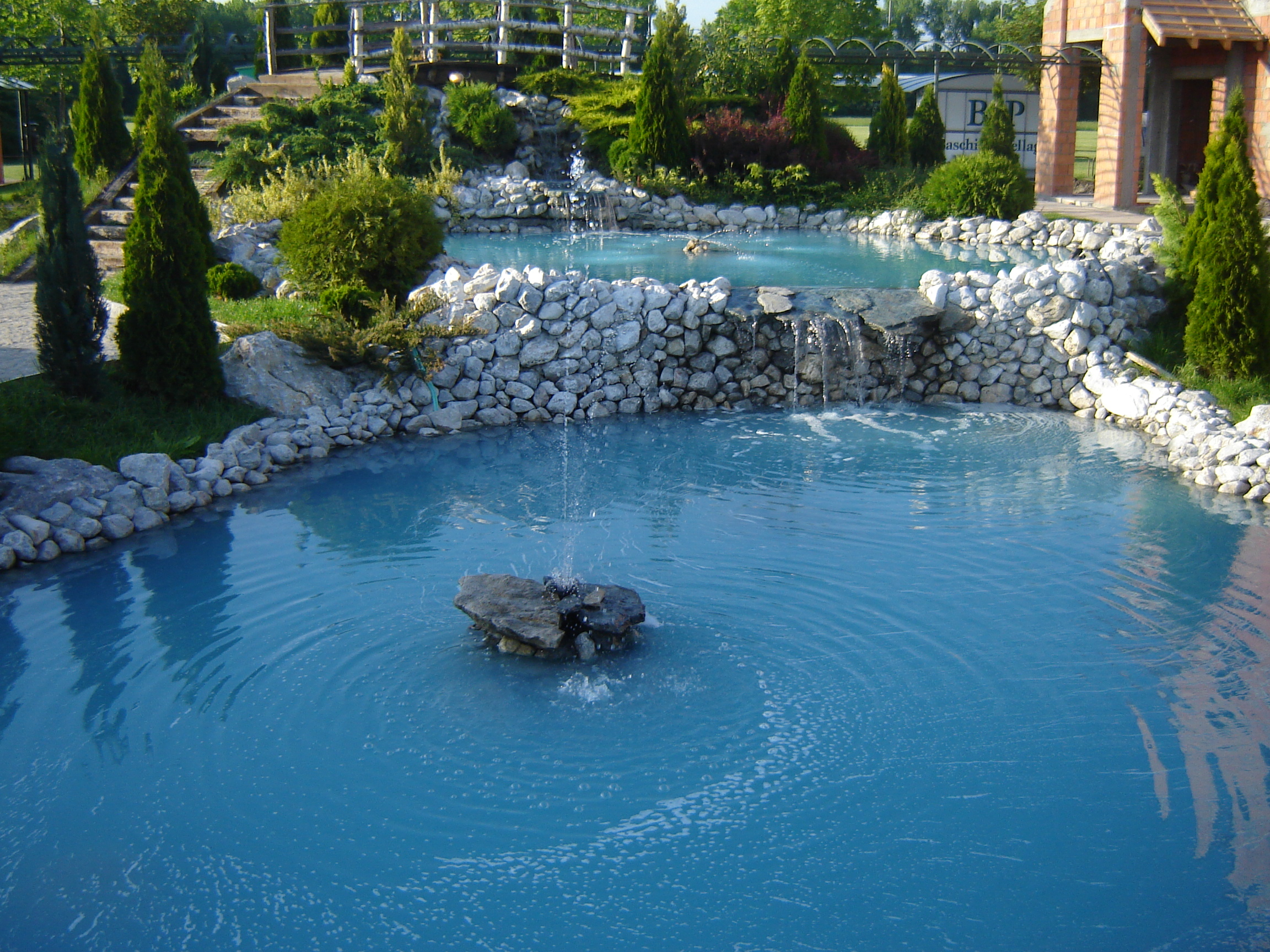
Fontana, Kovilovo 2006, Belgrade

Kovilovo (Serbian Cyrillic: Ковилово; IPA: [kɔ̌ʋilɔʋɔ]) is a suburban settlement of Belgrade, the capital of Serbia. It is located in the Belgrade's municipality of Palilula.

== Location ==
Kovilovo is located in the northern, Banat section of the municipality, 15 kilometer north of downtown Belgrade, on the crossroad of several streams and canals, most notably, the Vizelj. The settlement is located few kilometers to west of the Zrenjaninski put road which connects Belgrade with the town of Zrenjanin, also in Vojvodina. It is just south of Padinska Skela.

== History and population ==
The settlement originates from the 19th century farm (salaš) of Kovilovo, inhabited by the Hungarian workers who built the embankment on the Danube's left bank. It was named after the soldier of the Red Army, Mikhail Kovilov, who was killed here during the Belgrade Offensive in 1944.

Population is slowly declining: 1,063 inhabitants according to 1991 census, 1,039 by the 2002 census, out of which 92,5% are Serbs, and 920 in 2011.

== Characteristics ==
In 2005 a modern BG Sport and Olympic Centre Kovilovo was open, including seven shooting ranges within the BG Shooting Range and hosted to 2005 ISSF European Championship.
