= Mika Alas =

Coordinates: 44°50′05″N 20°28′19″E

- neighborhood
- Interactive map of Mika Alas
- Country: Serbia
- Time zone: UTC+1 (CET)
  - Summer (DST): UTC+2 (CEST)

Mika Alas (Serbian Cyrillic: Мика Алас) is an urban neighborhood of Belgrade, the capital of Serbia. It is located in Belgrade's municipality of Palilula.

== Location ==
Mika Alas is located in the Banat section of the municipality of Palilula, on the left bank of the Danube, where the Jojkićev Dunavac canal empties into the river across the river island (ada) of Kožara. Though administratively part of Belgrade's urban area, it is completely detached from the city's urban tissue.

== Geography ==
The settlement stretches along the Jojkićev Dunavac, starting from 200 metres (660 ft) before it empties into the Danube. When dug in the 1950s, the canal was 70 metres (230 ft) wide. In time, due to the mud and silt deposits, in some sections it is narrowed to only 7 metres (23 ft). It is actually the 6 km (3.7 mi) long final section of the Vizelj stream. In Borča, there is a pumping station which transfers the water from this stream into the Mokri Sebeš canal. By 2020, the communal services, which cut the poplars in the surrounding fields, left the cut trees and debris which clogged Jojkićev Dunavac in its the final section, cutting it off from the Danube, and turning it into the bog. As a result, the water turned black with fish, swans and ducks dying.

Fishes living in the surrounding waters include wels catfish, zander, common carp, common bream, silver carp, northern pike, sterlet, common barbel, asp and various other types of freshwater whitefish.

== Characteristics ==
Mika Alas is a weekend-settlement, which means it has no permanent population. However, out of 50 houses in the settlement, in time, some 20 families permanently moved in, while the rest remained for weekend visitors. The settlement also has no urban connection to other parts of Belgrade (the closest neighborhood is Krnjača, 1 kilometre (0.62 mi) to the east). The settlement was named after one of the most important Serbian mathematicians and a passionate fisherman (alas) Mihailo Petrović Alas (1868-1943).

Mika Alas was originally built by the fishermen, but their number dwindled in time, with only 3 officially licensed fishermen in 2021, down from 12 in the early 2010s. Apart from the pollution in the canal, fishing is also restricted by the elements in the Danube, where waves up to 2.5 metres (8 ft 2 in) tall are created by the košava wind. Another reason for the dying out of the craft is a generally low consumption of fish in Serbia, with peaks being feast days during the fasting periods, like the Saint Nicholas Day (19 December), or Christmas Eve (6 January).
