= Sava Kovačević =

Yugoslav Partisan commander (1905–1943)

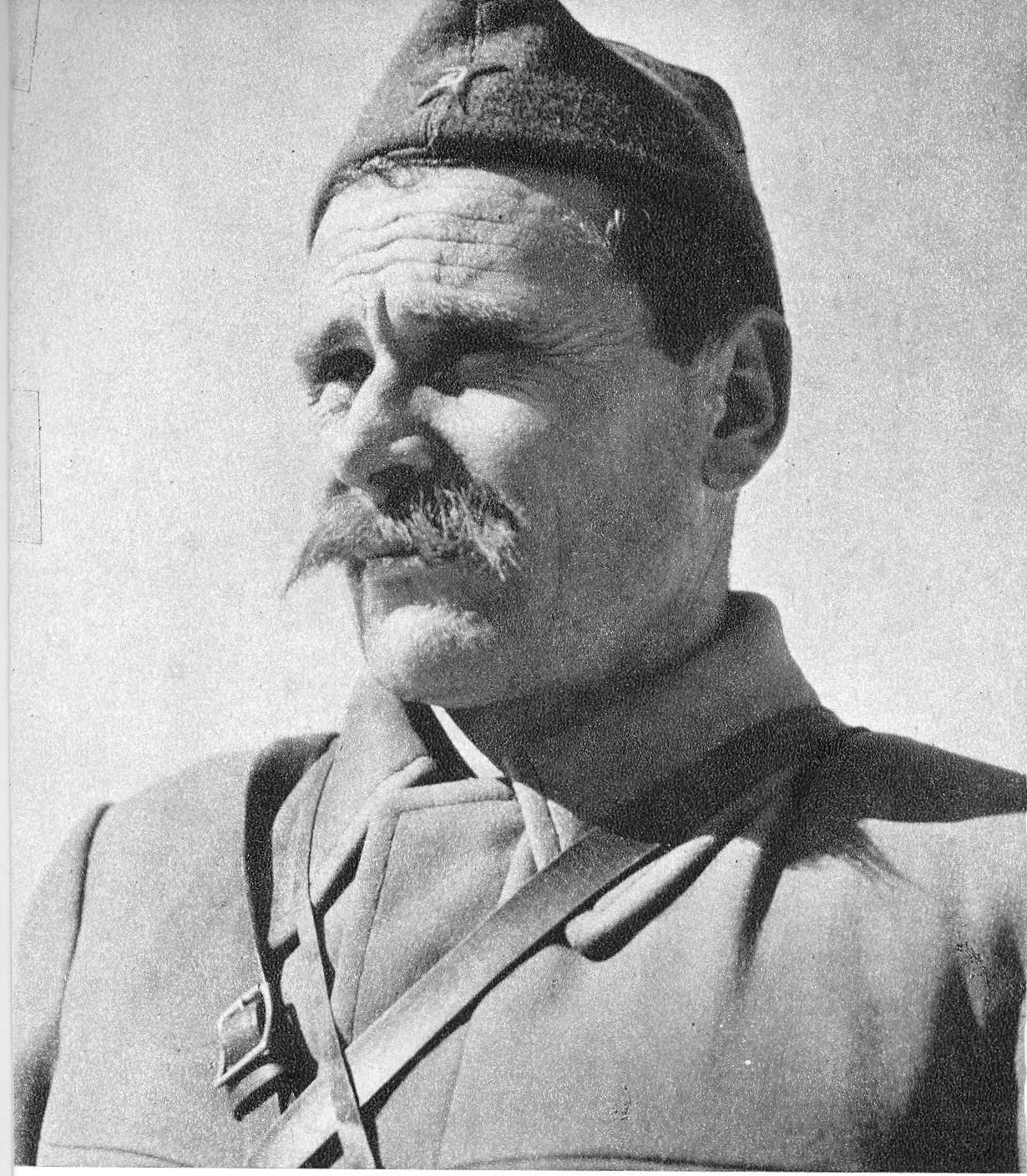
- Sava Kovačević in 1942
- Born: 25 January 1905; Nudo, Montenegro
- Died: 13 June 1943 (aged 38); Krekovi, Independent State of Croatia (now Bosnia and Herzegovina)
- Military career
- Allegiance: Yugoslav Partisans
- Service years: 1941–1943
- Rank: Colonel
- Commands: Nikšić Partisan Detachment; 5th Montenegrin Brigade; 3rd Shock Division
- Conflicts: World War II; Battle of Neretva; Battle of Sutjeska †
- Awards: Order of the People's Hero; Order of Kutuzov

Sava Kovačević (Serbian Cyrillic: Сава Ковачевић; 25 January 1905 – 13 June 1943) was a Yugoslav Partisan divisional commander during World War II, and one of the heroes of the communist Partisan movement.

== Early life ==
Kovačević was born in the village of Nudo near Grahovo to father Blagoje and mother Jovana (née Perović), into a family of peasants. At an early age, he worked as a lumberjack and blacksmith and adopted communism, becoming a member of the Communist Party of Yugoslavia (KPJ) in 1925. He gradually rose through the party ranks and became one of the communist leaders in Montenegro. He was often arrested for his activities.

== World War II ==
After the German-led Axis invasion of Yugoslavia, Kovačević was one of the leading organizers of the uprising in Montenegro against the Italian occupation. He became commander of the Nikšić Partisan Detachment, deputy commander of Main Headquarters of Montenegro and finally a member of Supreme Staff of the Yugoslav People's Liberation Army.

In June 1942, he became the first commander of the 5th Montenegrin (Sandzak) Brigade of the YPLA. His unit took part in the 1942 Bosanska Krajina Campaign (Bosnian Frontier Campaign) - an operation against Independent State of Croatia garrisons that brought large sections of Bosnia and Herzegovina under Partisan control. In February and March 1943, during the Battle of Neretva (German operation Weiss), Kovačević commanded his brigade in attacks on Prozor against the Italians and Konjic against joint Italian-Ustasha-German defenders. On 6 June, during the Battle of Sutjeska (German operation Schwarz), he became the commander of the 3rd Shock Division of the Yugoslav People's Liberation Army. His division covered the rear of other Partisan units while they successfully broke through German lines. The 3rd Shock Division, which was encumbered with wounded Partisans, was less successful in its attempt at breaking out. On 13 June, Kovačević was killed while personally leading his men during a charge against trenches held by the German 118th Jäger Division at Krekovi near Tjentište, Eastern Herzegovina, on the Sutjeska river.

Owing to his humble background and habit of disdain for the privileges of rank, Kovačević was one of the most popular Partisan commanders. He was famous for his personal courage: one of the well known episodes happened on 20 February 1943 in Ostrožac on the Neretva river when he, with his brigade commissar Dragiša Ivanović, in an unexpected encounter with a group of Italian tanks, managed to climb onto two tanks, Sava on the second and Dragiša on the third of three tanks, to kill their crews and to capture one tank each.

According to Milovan Đilas, the Montenegrin communist leadership had a hard time with Kovačević because he did not recognize Montenegrins as a separate nation from the Serbs.

== Death and legacy ==
Sava Kovačević died on 13 June 1943, during the Battle of Sutjeska, while leading a charge against German positions held by the 118th Jäger Division at Krekovi near Nevesinje. Despite being a division commander, he took a front-line role, rallying his men with a machine gun in hand. His bravery turned him into a symbol of Partisan heroism.

His heroic death made him one of the Partisan icons.

He was posthumously proclaimed People's Hero of Yugoslavia.

In honour of Kovačević, numerous streets were named after him, as well as urban neighbourhoods in Zemun and Palilula. Also, Savino Selo (literally: Sava's Village) in Vojvodina is named after him. Naval repair facility which operated in Tivat, Montenegro was named "MTRZ Sava Kovačević" (popularly called Arsenal), until its conversion into the yacht marina "Porto Montenegro".

== In popular culture ==
In the 1973 film Sutjeska, Kovačević was played by Serbian actor Ljuba Tadić.

Several songs have been written in memorization of Kovačević, singing about his heroism and death on Sutjeska. The most popular include "Što to huči Sutjeska" (What is Sutjeska up to) (Note: "Što to huči Sutjeska" was written in October 1943 during the war by the writer and then-manager of 4th Montenegrin and 2nd Proletarian Brigade Puniša Perović, who met Kovačević in Lastva at the start of the war. He based the melody on the songs that he heard and liked during the war, "Song about Shchors" (Mykola Shchors) and "Po šumama i gorama". The song quickly became popular, and after the war, it started appearing in elementary school books and was considered a folk song.) "Sivi Sokole" (Peregrine Falcon) (Note: "Sivi Sokole" mentions Sutjeska being crossed to save the wounded, but Sava being found dead on the ground. Many versions of "Sivi Sokole" have been made, the most popular one from Ismet Krcić.) and "Kraj Sutjeske hladne vode" (By Sutjeska, the cold water).
