= Palilula, Belgrade =

Palilula Палилула (Serbian)
- Municipality
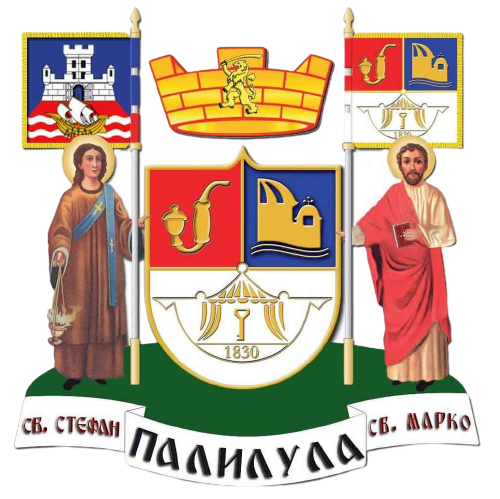
- Coat of arms
- Interactive map of Palilula
- Coordinates: 44°48′42″N 20°30′58″E
- Country: Serbia
- City: Belgrade
- Status: Municipality
- Settlements: 8

Government
  - Type: Municipality of Belgrade
  - Mun. president: Ivana Medić (SNS)

Area
  - Municipality: 450.62 km^{2} (173.99 sq mi)
  - Urban: 70.34 km^{2} (27.16 sq mi)

Population (2022)
  - Municipality: 182,624
  - Density: 405.27/km^{2} (1,049.7/sq mi)
- Time zone: UTC+1 (CET)
  - Summer (DST): UTC+2 (CEST)
- Postal code: 11000
- Area code: +381(0)11
- Car plates: BG
- Website: www.palilula.org.rs

Palilula (Serbian Cyrillic: Палилула, pronounced [pǎlilula]) is a municipality of the city of Belgrade. It has the largest area of all municipalities of Belgrade. The core of Palilula is close to the center of the city, but the municipality also includes sparsely populated land left of the Danube.

== Neighborhood ==
=== Location ===
Palilula is located east of Terazije in downtown Belgrade. Like most of Belgrade's neighborhoods it has no firm boundaries and is roughly bordered by the Ruzveltova street and the municipality and neighborhood of Zvezdara on the east, the neighborhood of Hadžipopovac in its own municipality on the north, the neighborhood and municipality of Stari Grad and Jevremovac on the northwest (Jevremovac actually belongs to the neighborhood of Palilula, but administratively is part of Stari Grad), and the Tašmajdan and Bulevar kralja Aleksandra on the south, bordering the municipality of Vračar.

=== Population ===
Six local communities, sub-municipal administrative units, which make up the neighborhood of Palilula had a population of 36,216 in 1981, 35,579 in 1991, 34,559 in 2002 and 26,942 in 2011. Palilula in the narrowest sense (local communities of Stara Palilula and Starina Novak, excluding the neighborhoods of Tašmajdan, Hadžipopovac, Profesorska Kolonija and Bogoslovija) had a population of 12,638 in 1981, 12,178 in 1991, 11,590 in 2002 and 9,817 in 2011.

=== History ===
First houses in the area were built in the 16th century. In the direction from today's Tašmajdan and Cvijićeva street there were gardens, vineyards, pastures but also mills and summer houses of the wealthier citizens of Belgrade. The neighborhood originated in the first half of the 18th century, when the Habsburg monarchy occupied northern Serbia 1717–1739. The settlement, built as an outer suburb of Belgrade, was originally named Karlstadt and was known for agriculture and skilled crafts and was considered as the most beautiful part of Belgrade at that time. In the early 19th century, it became overwhelmingly populated by the Serbs and was described as "the village one quarter of the hour walk" away from Belgrade. At the time, the village was made of small huts and hovels and mostly populated by the inhabitants from eastern Serbia.

In the 1830s, ruling prince Miloš Obrenović ordered his brother Jevrem Obrenović to resettle the Savamala neighborhood, located along the Sava river, and extending from the still Ottoman held Belgrade Fortress. Jevrem selected 30 families and settled them on the right bank of the Bulbulder stream. In 1840, villagers of Palilula rejected the regulatory plan of Belgrade, on the basis that projected new streets would be too wide, and later even tried to split from the municipality of Belgrade because of the city government's low funding for the village. However, in the late 19th century Palilula became part of the continuously built-up area of Belgrade. The neighborhood was mostly residential, with commercial facilities closer to the center of Belgrade. When Belgrade was divided into six quarters in 1860, Palilula was one of them. By the census of 1883 it became the most populous one in Belgrade with 7,318 inhabitants, and that number grew to 10,563 in 1890.

In 1930, a large, wooden stadium was built in the neighborhood. A work of Momir Korunović, it was constructed in only two months for the slet, a massive gymnastic festival held as part of the Sokol movement. It had a capacity of 45,000 spectators. In terms of architecture, it was noted for its ornamented doors, which Korunović embellished with the elements carved in the Serbian national style. After the slet was finished, the construction was dismantled and re-used as a mobile construction for other festivities. On the location of the stadium, the building of the University of Belgrade's Mechanical Engineering Faculty is situated today.

=== Characteristics ===
A section of Palilula is dedicated to the hajduk Starina Novak. Features bearing his name include the street, a local community, an elementary school founded in 1922 and a park. Area occupied by the park today, bounded by the streets of Starine Novaka, Cvijićeva and Dalmatinska, was named Starina Novak Square until 1954. In October 2017 city administration announced that a monument to Starina Novak will be erected in the park. The park covers 0.28 hectares (0.69 acres). Pedestrian square along the Takovska Street has also been adapted into the Palilula Park, which covers 0.23 hectares (0.57 acres). The Starina Novak park was thoroughly rearranged in the fall of 2023.

Area bounded by the streets of Stanoja Glavaša, Dalmatinska, Starine Novaka and Kneza Danila was, for the most part, occupied by the complex of the IKL factory. Before World War II, it was the Rogožarski factory, the first aircraft factory in Yugoslavia. After the war new Communist authorities nationalized the company, while the factory complex in Palilula was transformed into the IKL (ball bearing factory) in 1948. The complex was demolished and in 2015 construction of the residential and commercial neighborhood of "Central Garden" began. Apart from the commercial and business sections, it will have 400 apartments. In November 2017 a construction of the 16-storey "Business Garden Tower" was announced, with the deadline of 18 months.

In September 2019 it was announced that the area of the former open air shopping mall (demolished in 2017), stretching between the Kraljice Marije and Knez Danilova streets, will be adapted into the Raša Popov Park. It is named after the children's author Raša Popov, who lived in one of the neighboring buildings until his death in 2017. His bust will also be placed in the park, which in total covers 2,800 m^{2} (30,000 sq ft). Citizen disproved the original design of "concrete park", asking for more green areas, so city changed the project. The park was scheduled to be finished in the spring of 2020. It was also decided to build a full, 2.5 m (8 ft 2 in) tall monument of Popov with book and umbrella, instead of a bust. The sculpture is made by Boris Deheljan, from steel bolts and nuts. It should be dedicated in July 2020. Deadline was then moved for September 2020 as city claimed the reconstruction is extremely complicated. The space was opened on 17 October 2020, but instead of the proper park it was adapted into the Plateau of Raša Popov.

=== Name ===
Apocryphal, folk etymology stories claim that name palilula came from the expression pali lulu which in English means light a pipe. One anecdote goes back to times when Belgrade and Serbia were occupied by the Ottoman Empire and Palilula was the area where most crops were, so Turkish rulers banned smoking due to a few instances of accidentally setting crops on fire. In the late summer and early autumn when all the crops had been harvested, the smoking ban was lifted and locals announced this by calling neighbors, letting them know that pipes might be lit. Another explanation comes from the time of Prince Miloš Obrenović's rule; he banned smoking in Belgrade so people could only smoke outside the city gates.

However, chroniclers claim that the origin of the name comes from the brickyards which were located along the right bank of the Bulbulder stream. After the mud for bricks was mixed, shaped in molds and dried in the sun, the bricks were stacked to form conical shapes. The straw was then placed beneath, and set on fire, to bake and harden the bricks. The smoke vents beneath the bricks were called lula ("pipe"), hence the name.

== Municipality ==
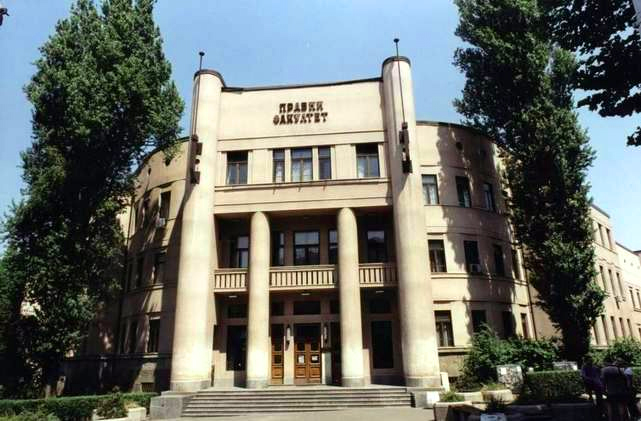
Belgrade Law School

=== Area ===
The area of Palilula is generally the north of Belgrade. It is the northernmost of all Belgrade's municipalities and the easternmost of all municipalities. It is located on both banks of the Danube, which divides it in two: Šumadija section (on the right bank) and Banat section (on the left bank).

Šumadija section borders the municipalities of Stari Grad to the west, Vračar and Zvezdara to the south and Grocka to the extreme southeast. It also has a river border on the Danube to the province of Vojvodina (Municipality of Pančevo).

Banat section has no land borders to the other Belgrade municipalities, but has a river border on the Danube to the municipalities of Zemun and Stari Grad. The Danube also forms a complete western border to the rest of the Syrmia region in Vojvodina (municipality of Stara Pazova), while the river Tamiš is the eastern border (municipalities of Pančevo and Opovo). On the extreme north, Palilula borders the municipality of Zrenjanin (village of Čenta on the Karaš canal which connects the Danube and the Tamiš).

=== Geography ===
Šumadija section marks the northernmost point of Šumadija with Karaburma headland extending into the Danube. The prominent features in this part are the hills of Karaburma and Milićevo brdo, the spa of Višnjička Banja and the peninsula (formerly an island) Ada Huja.

Banat section is the extreme southwestern part of Banat region, known as Pančevački Rit. A 400 km^{2} (150 sq mi) large, flat, marshy floodplain of the Danube and Tamiš, it has been drained since 1945 but still has many features of a swamp, including slow, meandering and flooding streams (Vizelj, Mokri Sebeš, Jojkićev Dunavac, Dunavac, etc.) and marshy bogs (Sebeš, Veliko Blato, Široka Bara). An island of Kožara is located on the Danube, and is the projected starting point of the planned, much larger, artificial island of Čaplja. The spa of Ovčanska Banja is also located here. The area close to the Danube is heavily forested.

In the Pančevački Rit section there are two official, unfenced hunting grounds. One is named Pančevački Rit, while the other is called simply Rit. The Rit is located near Padinska Skela, 15 km (9.3 mi) from Belgrade along the Zrenjaninski put. It covers an area of 82.63 km^{2} (31.90 sq mi), of which 0.5 km^{2} (0.19 sq mi) is a pheasantry. Animals bred in the facility include roe deer, hare, quail, mallard, greylag goose and 13,000 pheasants per year.

=== History and administration ===
The municipality was created in 1956. On January 3, 1957, the municipality of Karaburma was annexed to it, while in 1965 the municipality of Krnjača (with entire Pančevački Rit) also administratively joined Palilula.

Presidents of the Municipality:

- 1997–2000: Gordana Todić (b. 1955)
- 2000–October 21, 2004: Milan Marković (b. 1970)
- October 21, 2004 – June 18, 2012: Danilo Bašić (b. 1973)
- June 18, 2012 – June 6, 2016: Stojan Nikolić (b. 1976)
- June 6, 2016 – June 28, 2021: Aleksandar Jovičić (b. 1976)
- July 26, 2021 – present: Miroslav Ivanović (b. 1954)

=== Dunavski Venac and Čenta ===
The idea of separating the area of former municipality of Krnjača start gaining momentum in the 2000s, this time under the name of Dunavski Venac. As procedure in the city statute provides that the municipal assembly (in this case, of Palilula) needs to start the motion in the city assembly, after years of public agitation, the municipal assembly of Palilula agreed to do so in summer 2005. However it did not officially do so, and the organization for the separation of Dunavski Venac announced it will go to court.

The village of Čenta in the Vojvodina's municipality of Zrenjanin is located on the northern border of the municipality of Palilula. From time to time local residents have asked for Čenta to be annexed to the City of Belgrade. The majority of the population work in the territory of Belgrade and until recently, one regular bus line of Belgrade City public transportation connected Čenta to Belgrade.

=== Demographics ===
Historical population
| Year | Pop. | ±% p.a. |
|---|---|---|
| 1948 | 47,168 | — |
| 1953 | 59,085 | +4.61% |
| 1961 | 89,141 | +5.27% |
| 1971 | 126,380 | +3.55% |
| 1981 | 150,484 | +1.76% |
| 1991 | 156,587 | +0.40% |
| 2002 | 155,902 | −0.04% |
| 2011 | 173,521 | +1.20% |
| 2022 | 182,624 | +0.47% |

With a population of 182,624 inhabitants, according to the 2022 census results, Palilula is the second most populous municipality of Belgrade (after Novi Beograd. The fastest-growing population in the municipality is still the suburb of Borča.

=== Ethnic structure ===
According to the 2022 Census of population:

| Ethnic group | Population |
|---|---|
| Serbs | 148,809 |
| Romani | 4,983 |
| Gorani | 2,847 |
| Yugoslavs | 1,179 |
| Macedonians | 579 |
| Romanians | 543 |
| Muslims | 516 |
| Montenegrins | 457 |
| Russians | 420 |
| Croats | 397 |
| Bosniaks | 295 |
| Hungarians | 224 |
| Others | 5,462 |
| Unknown | 15,913 |
| Total | 182,624 |

=== Neighborhoods and settlements ===
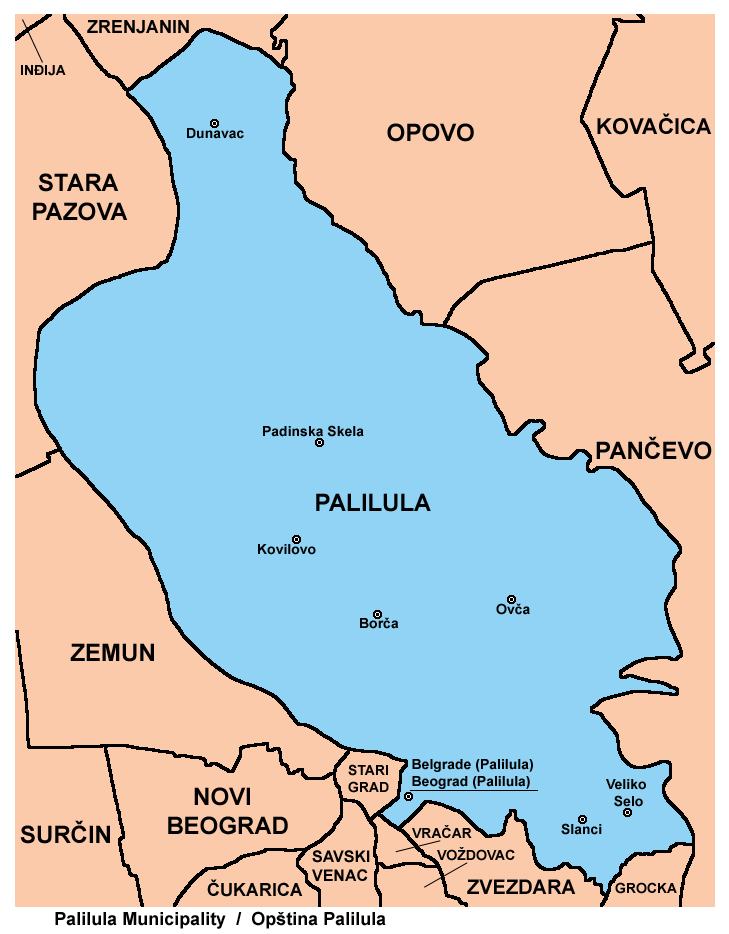
Map of Palilula municipality

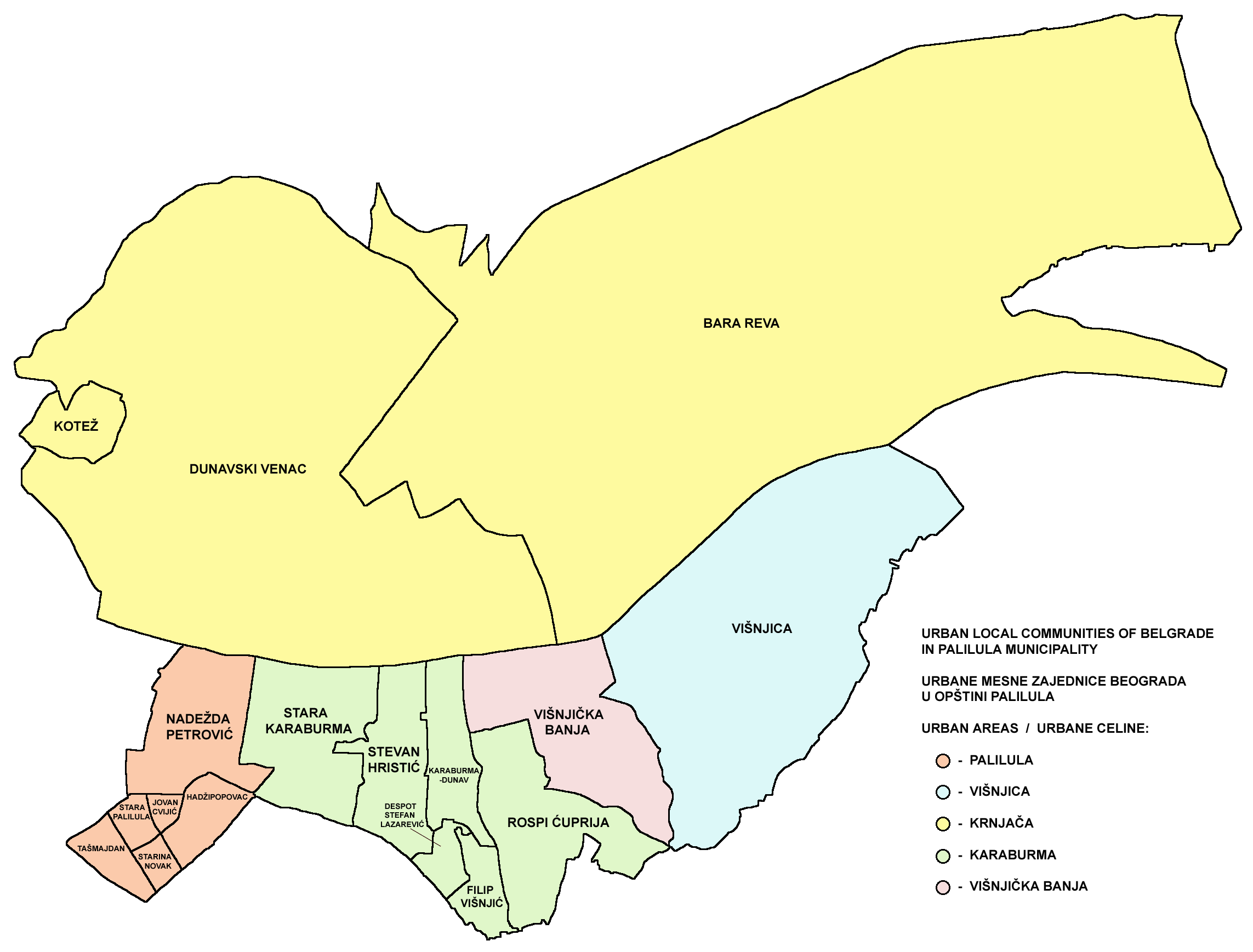
Map of Urban local communities of Belgrade in Palilula municipality

Right bank of Danube

Neighborhoods of urban Palilula on the right bank of Danube:

- Ada Huja
- Bogoslovija
- Ćalije
- Deponija
- Dunav City
- Hadžipopovac
- Karaburma
- Karaburma II
- Karaburma-Dunav
- Lešće
- Nova Karaburma
- Palilula
- Profesorska Kolonija
- Rospi Ćuprija
- Stara Karaburma
- Tašmajdan
- Viline Vode
- Vilingrad
- Višnjica
- Višnjička Banja

Settlements of suburban Palilula on the right bank of the Danube:

- Slanci
- Veliko Selo

Left bank of Danube

Neighborhoods of urban Palilula on the left bank of Danube:

- Blok Braća Marić
- Blok Branko Momirov
- Blok Grga Andrijanović
- Blok Sava Kovačević
- Blok Sutjeska
- Blok Zaga Malivuk
- Čaplja
- Dunavski Venac
- Kotež
- Kožara
- Krnjača
- Mika Alas
- Partizanski Blok
- Reva

Settlements and neighborhoods of suburban Palilula on the left bank of Danube:

- Besni Fok
- Borča
- Crvenka
- Dunavac
- Glogonjski Rit
- Jabučki Rit
- Kovilovo
- Ovča
- Padinska Skela
- Preliv
- Sebeš (Ovčanski)
- Široka Bara
- Široka Greda
- Vrbovski

Note: Borča and Ovča are classified as urban settlements (towns).

Neighborhoods of Borča

- Atovi
- Borča Greda
- Borča I
- Borča II
- Borča III
- Borča IV
- Borča V
- Guvno
- Irgot
- Mali Zbeg
- Nova Borča
- Popova Bara
- Pretok
- Sebeš (Borčanski)
- Slatina
- Stara Borča
- Vihor
- Zrenjaninski Put

Neighborhoods of Padinska Skela

- Industrijsko Naselje
- Novo Naselje
- Srednje Naselje
- Staro Naselje
- Tovilište

=== Economy and transportation ===
Industry and adjoining economic activities are located mostly along the right bank of the Danube. It includes the highly industrialized neighborhoods of Viline Vode (TEMPO cash-and-carry center, several gravel and sand extracting companies on the Danube's bank, Beograd railway, Centroprom, Martez, Tehnohemija, Jugopapir, Duga, the Avala cardboard factory, Balkan, the eastern part of the port of Belgrade and the railway station Beograd-Dunav) and Ada Huja (hangars and companies for building and construction, including a series of concrete plants and gravel and aggregates storing and treating facilities, paper and cardboard factory Avala-Ada, furniture factory Novi Dom, gravel storages of Tembo and DV Trade, etc.). It also includes a series of brickworks which occupy extensive areas of the northern ridge of the Field of Višnjica (Polet, Trudbenik, Jedinstvo, Kozara, Balkan, Rekord). There is also an extensive industrial zone in Krnjača and agricultural industry in Padinska Skela.

Palilula is crisscrossed by some of the major railroads in Belgrade area: Zrenjaninski put, Pančevački put, Višnjička street, Slanački put, etc. Belgrade's only bridge over the Danube, Pančevo Bridge (with railway) is located in Palilula.

Intensive agricultural production has developed in Banat section and eastern areas around Veliko Selo and Slanci, producing large amounts of food (grains, fruits, vegetables, dairy products, etc.) for the population of Belgrade. Palilula has the largest agricultural area of all municipalities of Belgrade. It covers an area of 298 square kilometers, or 66,5% of the entire municipal territory.

Palilula Greenmarket (Paliluska pijaca) is a small farmers market in the neighborhood of Palilula, along the 27. marta Street, below the Tašmajdan. It developed as an unregulated market in 1949. In November 2017 it was closed as the construction of the combined shopping center, which would partially include the modernized greenmarket, will begin. Some of the market stalls have been placed on the open, at the plateau near the Tašmajdan Sports and Recreation Center in the Ilije Garašanina Street, until the works are finished. The estimated length of the construction of the new market is 18 months, or May 2019. The new building has a total floor area of 12,691 m (41,637 ft) and because of the shape and multi-layered appearance, it has been nicknamed "Vasa's Torte". In May 2019 the deadline was moved to September 2019. Though deputy mayor Goran Vesić confirmed that the market will be opened on 1 September, though the construction works were finished by this date, the facility wasn't connected to communal grid, including the electric one, nothing inside was installed and the object had no necessary permits for becoming operational, so the deadline was moved for 1 December, and then to the end of December. It was finally opened on 30 December 2019. Few months later, being located indoors and due to the 2020 COVID-19 pandemic, it was the first Belgrade farmers market to be closed, and the last one to get opened (23 March-28 April).

The following table gives a preview of total number of registered people employed in legal entities per their core activity (as of 2022):

| Activity | Total |
|---|---|
| Agriculture, forestry and fishing | 940 |
| Mining and quarrying | 103 |
| Manufacturing | 9,353 |
| Electricity, gas, steam and air conditioning supply | 164 |
| Water supply; sewerage, waste management and remediation activities | 825 |
| Construction | 3,851 |
| Wholesale and retail trade, repair of motor vehicles and motorcycles | 12,415 |
| Transportation and storage | 4,752 |
| Accommodation and food services | 2,825 |
| Information and communication | 5,588 |
| Financial and insurance activities | 1,721 |
| Real estate activities | 341 |
| Professional, scientific and technical activities | 5,538 |
| Administrative and support service activities | 6,759 |
| Public administration and defense; compulsory social security | 8,098 |
| Education | 5,602 |
| Human health and social work activities | 1,751 |
| Arts, entertainment and recreation | 2,490 |
| Other service activities | 1,258 |
| Individual agricultural workers | 180 |
| Total | 74,555 |

=== Culture, education and sports ===
Urban Palilula hosts some of the most important faculties within Belgrade University: the Technical Faculty, the Faculty of Law and the Mining and Geology Faculty. Also, the building of Radio Television of Serbia, St. Mark's Church, Tašmajdan Park, Pionir Hall for sports, and the stadium of the OFK Belgrade soccer team are all located in the municipality.

Park "Đuro Strugar" is located between the streets Mitropolita Petra, Braće Grim, Jaše Prodanovića and Čarlija Čaplina, which is effectively split in two by the park. It is situated north of the "Rade Končar" school of electrotechnics and west of the Pionir Ice Hall in the Hall Aleksandar Nikolić complex. The park have a children's playground and basketball court and has been renovated in May 2017.

=== Tourism ===
The spas of Višnjička Banja and Ovčanska Banja are not used or developed enough. Belgrade's largest kart racing track is located in Ada Huja. The future artificial island of Čaplja on the Danube is planned as a modern entertainment park, with aqua parks, golf courses, etc.

== International cooperation ==
Palilula is twinned with following cities and municipalities:

- Faiakes, Greece, since 2007
- Gradiška, Bosnia and Herzegovina, since 2019

== See also ==
- Subdivisions of Belgrade
- List of Belgrade neighborhoods and suburbs
