= Dunavski Venac =

Dunavski Venac Дунавски венац
- Urban neighbourhood
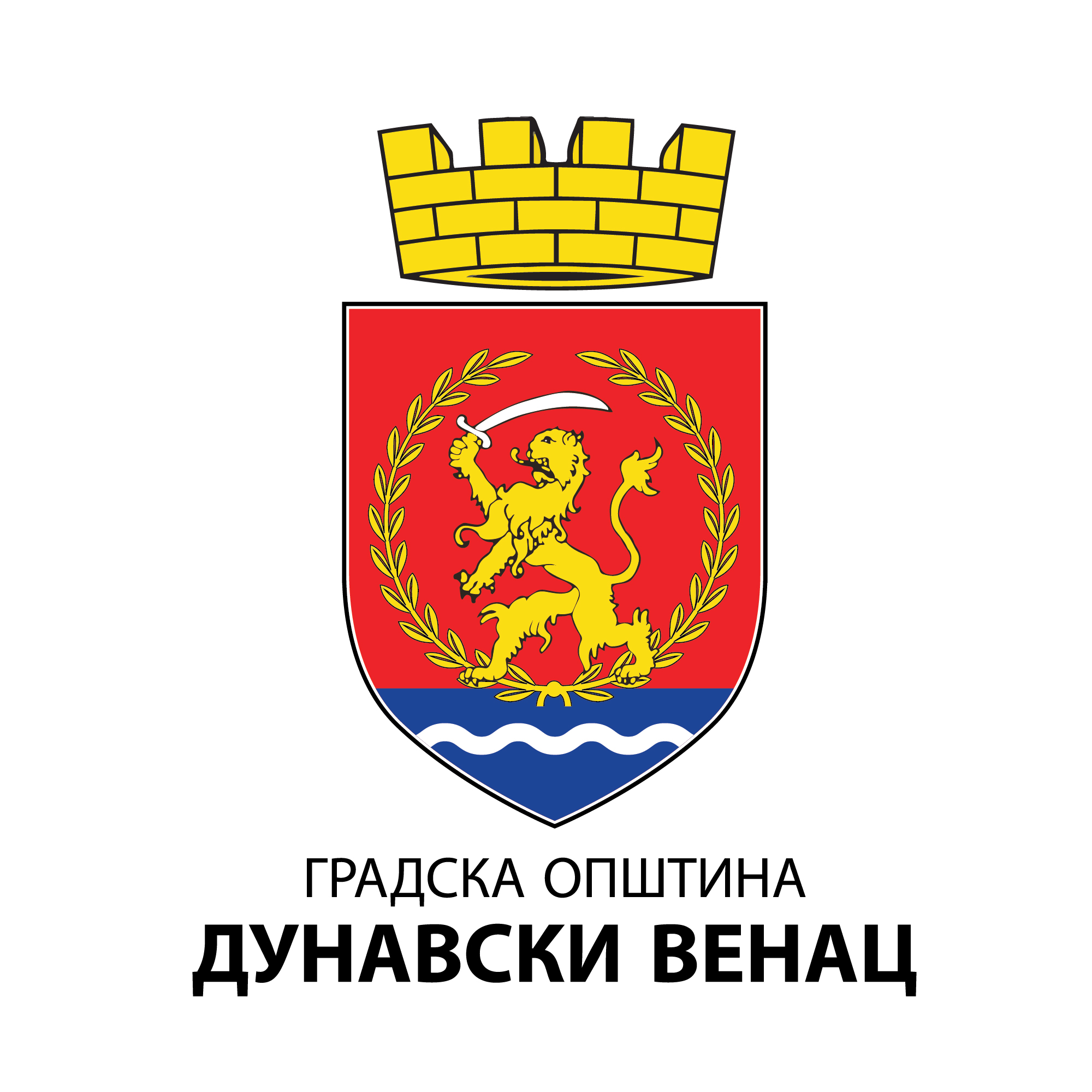
- Seal

- Location within Belgrade
- Coordinates: 44°51′09″N 20°29′44″E
- Country: Serbia
- Region: Belgrade
- Municipality: Palilula
- Time zone: UTC+1 (CET)
  - Summer (DST): UTC+2 (CEST)
- Area code: +381(0)11
- Car plates: BG

Dunavski Venac (Serbian Cyrillic: Дунавски венац) is an urban neighborhood of Belgrade, the capital of Serbia. It is located in Belgrade's municipality of Palilula, geographically located in Banat.

== Location & neighborhood ==
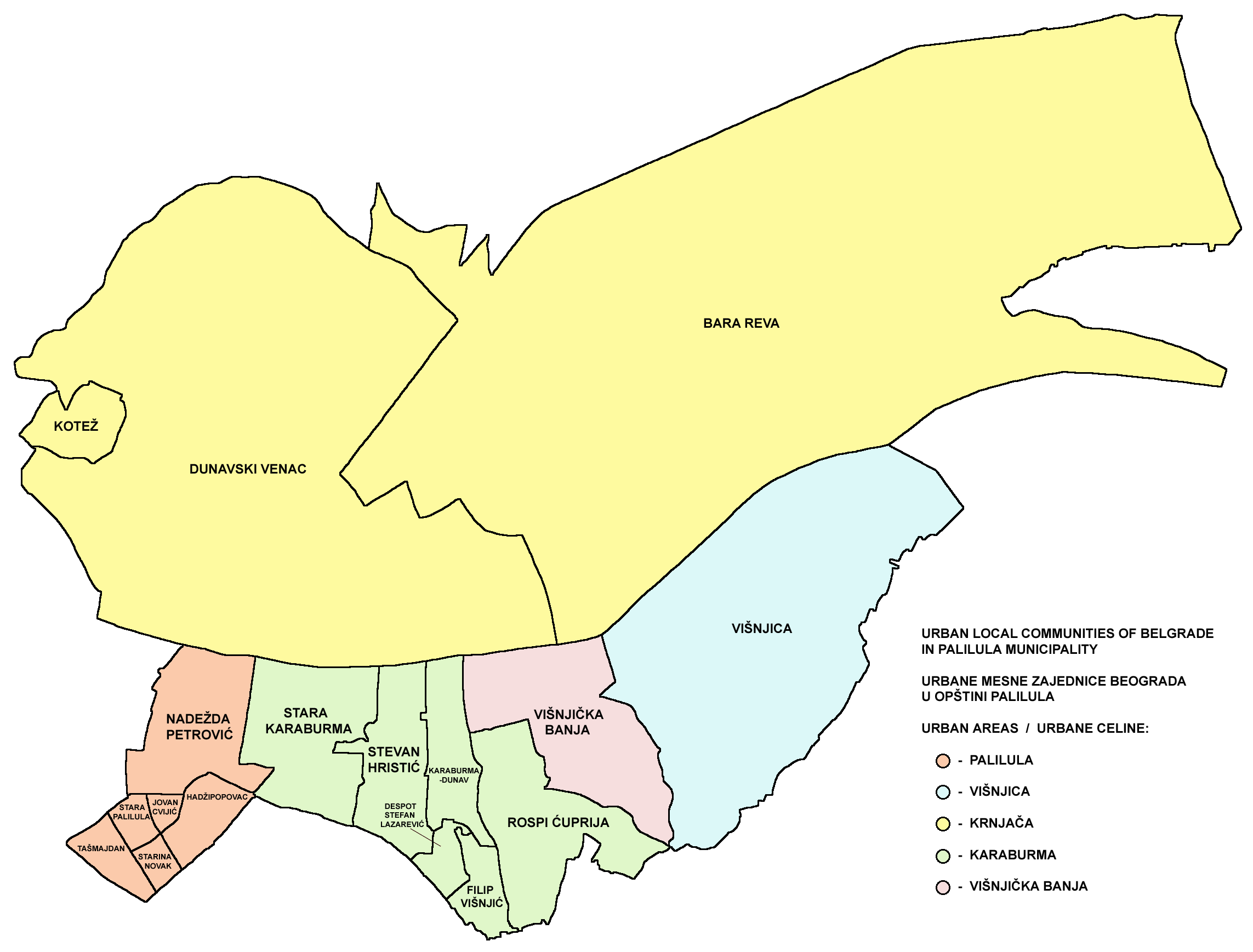
Map of Urban local communities of Belgrade in Palilula municipality

Dunavski Venac is located north of the Kotež and Krnjača's Blok Sutjeska neighborhoods. On the west it borders the Mokri Sebeš canal while on the east and north it stretched along the Zrenjanski put road which connects Belgrade and Zrenjanin. Given its position, Dunavski Venac is the northernmost urban neighborhood of Belgrade.

Dunavski Venac is entirely residential area. It has no industrial facilities while commerce has begun developing only recently as the neighborhood stretched along the Zrenjaninski put. The name of the neighborhood is descriptive, patterned after the name of Belgrade's municipality of Savski Venac and means the Danube's rim (even though it is not on the Danube's bank).

== Municipality ==
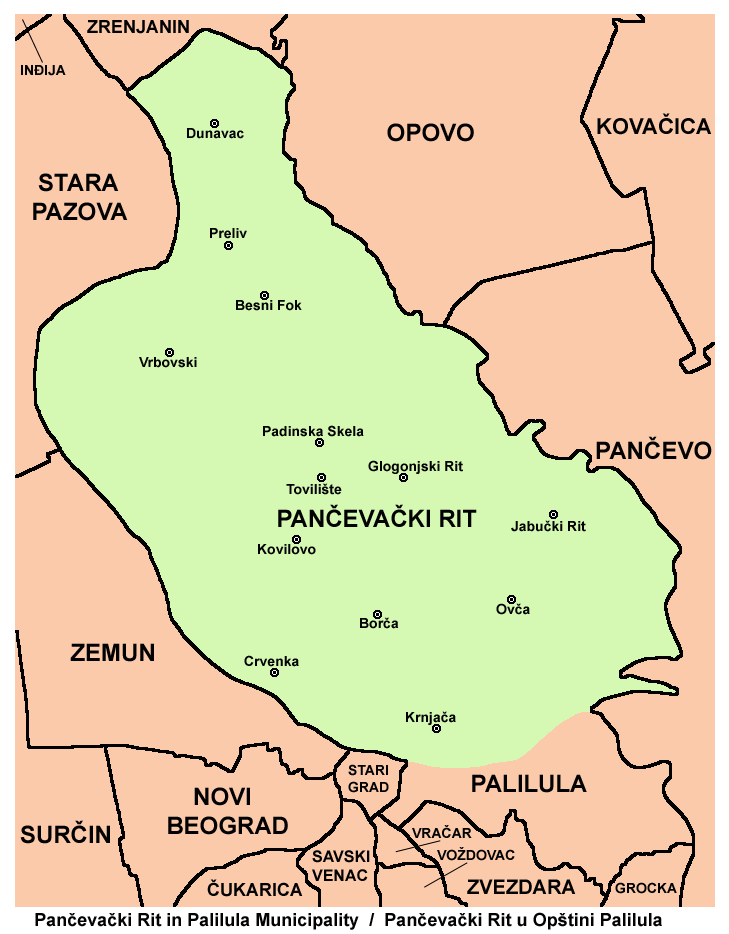
Map of proposed municipality of Dunavski Venac (Pančevački Rit geographical area)

Dunavski Venac is also the proposed name for the future municipality of Belgrade. At the moment, it is the name of the local community which comprises most of Krnjača, with a population of 13,414 in 2002. Since the late 1990s a notion of the area on the left bank of the Danube splitting from the municipality of Palilula began gaining a momentum. In 2003 a petition signed by 17,000 inhabitants from the area was handed to the Belgrade City Assembly which, at the time, judged that conditions for creation of new municipality were not fulfilled. In 2005 Municipal assembly of Palilula finally accepted to support the move but later decided the opposite so the Organization of the establishment of the municipality of Dunavski Venac announced it will sue the municipality of Palilula. The Supreme Court of Serbia denied jurisdiction in this case. Area had its own municipality 1955-1965 (prior to 1955 it had four municipalities: Borča, Ovča, Padinska Skela and Krnjača which merged into one municipality, Krnjača, in 1955 which in turn was annexed to Palilula in 1965). The proposed new municipality, if accepted and confirmed by the Belgrade City assembly, will have an area of 407 km^{2} and a population of 86,841 (2011).

== See also ==
- List of Belgrade neighborhoods
- List of former and proposed municipalities of Belgrade

== Map sources ==
- Beograd - plan grada; M@gic M@p, 2006; ISBN 86-83501-53-1
- Beograd - plan i vodič; Geokarta, 1999; ISBN 86-459-0006-8
