= Kotež =

Kotež Котеж
- Urban neighbourhood
- Location within Belgrade
- Coordinates: 44°51′10″N 20°28′18″E
- Country: Serbia
- Region: Belgrade
- Municipality: Palilula

Population (2002)
  - Total: 7.287
- Time zone: UTC+1 (CET)
  - Summer (DST): UTC+2 (CEST)
- Area code: +381(0)11
- Car plates: BG

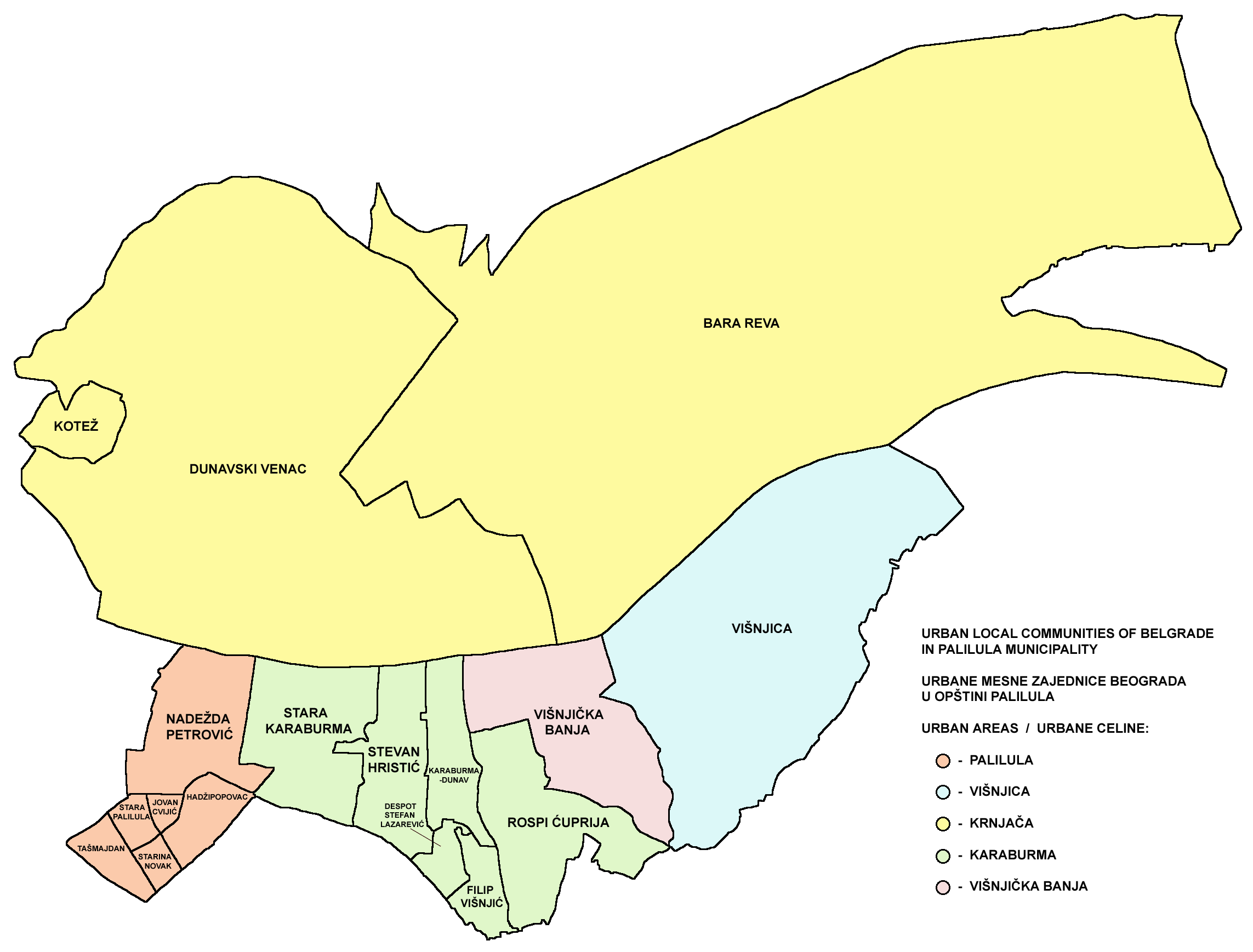
Map of Urban local communities of Belgrade in Palilula municipality

Kotež (Serbian Cyrillic: Котеж) is an urban neighborhood of Belgrade, the capital of Serbia. It is located in Belgrade's municipality of Palilula.

== Location ==
Kotež is located in the Palilula municipality section that falls in Banat region, on the northern bank of the Kalovita canal. It also borders the neighborhoods of Dunavski Venac to the north and Krnjača's neighborhoods Blok Sutjeska to the east and Partizanski Blok to the southeast.

== Characteristics ==
Originally intended as the western extension of Krnjača (and officially part of it until 1971 when Krnjača lost a status of the separate settlement and became part of the Belgrade City proper itself), it was constructed west of the Zrenjaninski put road which connects the cities of Belgrade and Zrenjanin, without urbanistic connection to any other neighborhoods. As the settlements in this area grew, Kotež today makes one continuous built-up area with Krnjača and Borča to the north.

At the time being built in the middle of the nowhere, the settlement was constructed in the shape of perfect elongated octagon. Since the 1980s the settlement stretched over its envisioned geometrical proportions and now it is core of the chaotic and irregular expanded urbanized area, mostly to the west and south. The area is entirely residential, without industrial and almost any commercial facilities. It has a population of 7,287 in 2002.

Serbian Orthodox Church of the Holy Apostles Peter and Paul was built in the neighborhood in 2009. It contains the relics of Saint Petar of Koriša.

In the early 2000s Kotež became known Serbia-wide for its bustling hip-hop scene that developed within the neighborhood with groups like Prti Bee Gee, Bad Copy, Blind Business, Bitcharke na travi, and the associated solo acts that they spawned like Ajs Nigrutin and Timjah.

== Sources ==
- Beograd - plan grada; M@gic M@p, 2006; ISBN 86-83501-53-1
- Beograd - plan i vodič; Geokarta, 1999; ISBN 86-459-0006-8
