= Kožara =

Coordinates: 44°50′17″N 20°27′19″E

Kožara (Serbian Cyrillic: Кожара) is a river island (ada) in Serbia, located on the left bank of the Danube. It is part of the Belgrade City proper and belongs to the Belgrade's municipality of Palilula.

== Location ==
Kožara is a triangle-shaped island, located in the Banat section of the municipality of Palilula between the Danube and the Jojkićev Dunavac canal, ending section of the Vizelj stream in Pančevački Rit ("Jojkić's Little Danube", named so after the former mayor of Belgrade, Đurica Jojkić).

== Characteristics ==
The area of Kožara is around 1 square kilometre (0.39 sq mi). The name means "leather island" in Serbian.

The island is floodable, completely covered with forest and without permanent population. On the Jojkićev Dunavac's mouth into the Danube, across Kožara, a weekend-settlement of Mika Alas is located. There are several permanent elongated bogs on the island.

It represents an oasis of undisturbed natural life even though it is only 600 meters away from the old core of Belgrade (the neighborhood of Dorćol, right across the Danube). Despite this, in 2005 Belgrade City government announced that Kožara is the most likely site of the future much enlarged semi-artificial island envisioned as the twin-island of the Veliko Ratno Ostrvo, also on the Danube, but some 800 meters to the southwest. Unlike Veliko Ratno Ostrvo which is protected by the law and any human interference is prohibited, future Kožara (probably with changed name; temporary name for the time being is Čaplja) is projected as the island-aqua park and major tourist attraction. However, as of August 2022 no work has begun on this project.

== Protection ==
In June 2021, the city officially started the procedure of protecting the section of the Danube's left bank under the name of "Foreland on Danube's left bank at Belgrade", on roughly 18.58 square kilometres (7.17 sq mi). Foreland refers to the land area between the embankment and the river, which is not protected from floods. The area will include Kožara, and the much wider marshland of Beljarica to the northwest. Parts will be in the second level of protection, where the activities and interventions to enhance and revitalize the area will be allowed, while the majority will be in the third level, where all potentially harmed activities will be forbidden.
