= Krnjača, Belgrade =

Krnjača Крњача
- Urban neighbourhood
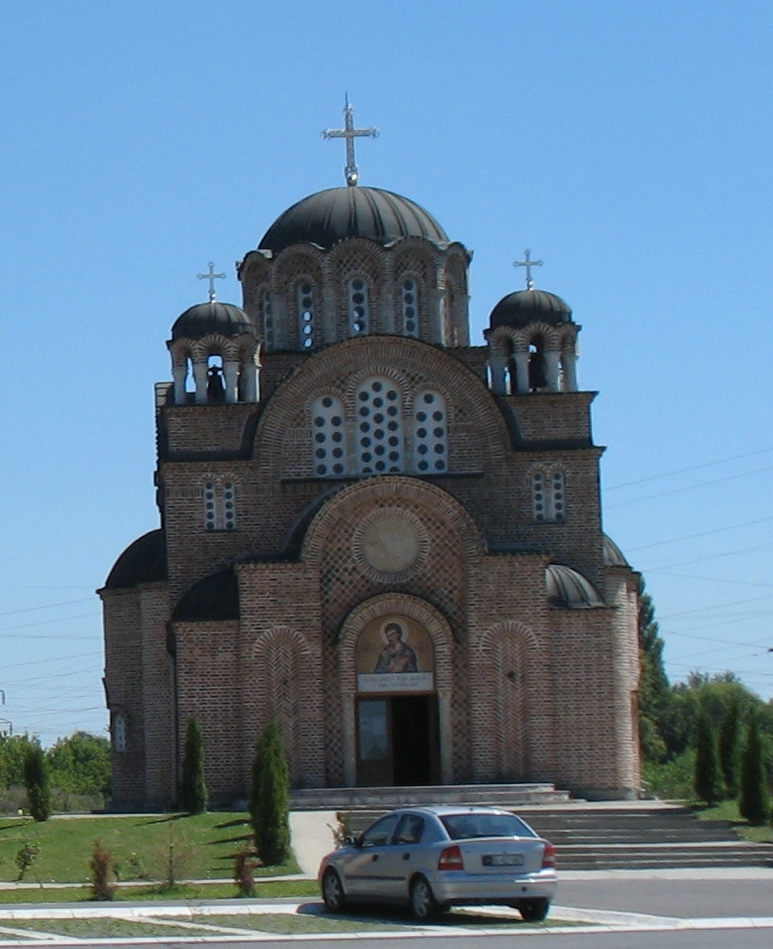
- Church of Saint Luke

- Location within Belgrade
- Coordinates: 44°50′29″N 20°30′01″E
- Country: Serbia
- Region: Belgrade
- Municipality: Palilula

Population (2002)
  - Total: 23.000
- Time zone: UTC+1 (CET)
  - Summer (DST): UTC+2 (CEST)
- Area code: +381(0)11
- Car plates: BG

Krnjača (Serbian Cyrillic: Крњача, pronounced [kř̩ɲat͡ʃa]) is an urban neighborhood of Belgrade, the capital of Serbia. It is located in Belgrade's municipality of Palilula.

== Location and population ==
Krnjača is located on the left bank of the Danube, across the Belgrade proper, to which it is connected only by one bridge, the Pančevo Bridge. The settlement is built behind the long embankment along the Danube, but it is still often flooded by the river. Krnjača is much scattered and stretched along two major roads in this area, the Pančevački put which connects Belgrade to the city of Pančevo and Zrenjaninski put which connects Belgrade to the city of Zrenjanin.

Krnjača is bordered by the Danube to the south, the Jojkićev Dunavac canal to the west and the Mokri Sebeš canal and the Veliko Blato bog to the north and east. The Kalovita canal flows through the middle of the neighborhood. Through Dunavski Venac, Krnjača makes an urban connection to Borča on the north and through Reva on the east, it stretches all the way to Pančevo.

By the 1971 census, the last one which recorded Krnjača as a separate settlement, the population was 11,834. According to the 2002 census, population of the area which made Krnjača before 1970s is 23,509 (Dunavski Venac 13,414, Reva 2,808 and Kotež 7,287).

== History ==
During the 1717–1739 Austrian occupation of northern Serbia, when both banks of the Danube were Austrian, a massive process of construction works in Belgrade began. The goal was to transform Belgrade into the Baroque city, rather than the oriental one. The task of designing the new city was given to Nicolas Doxat de Démoret. In his plans, Doxat envisioned the proper, star-shaped fortification on the location of modern Krnjača, across the Belgrade. Despite the maps printed with the existing fortification, the ramparts in the swamp were never built, though some works on the construction were conducted.

First mention of the name Krnjača, as part of the Borča village's area, dates back from 1823. Settlement is much younger and originally was known as Nova Borča (New Borča). Between the two World wars it was still part of Borča under the name of Rit-Krnjača (Marsh-Krnjača). After 1945, Krnjača split as a separate village and became seat of its own municipality on May 30, 1952. In 1955, with new territorial reorganization, neighboring municipalities of Borča, Ovča and Padinska Skela were annexed to the municipality of Krnjača. In turn, in 1965 municipality of Krnjača was abolished and annexed to the municipality of Paliula. A movement for separating area of the former municipality from Paliula has been vocal in the last 10 years and as a result in 2005 Palilula's Municipal assembly proposed to the Belgrade City assembly to allow the formation of the new municipality of Dunavski Venac.

== Neighborhoods ==
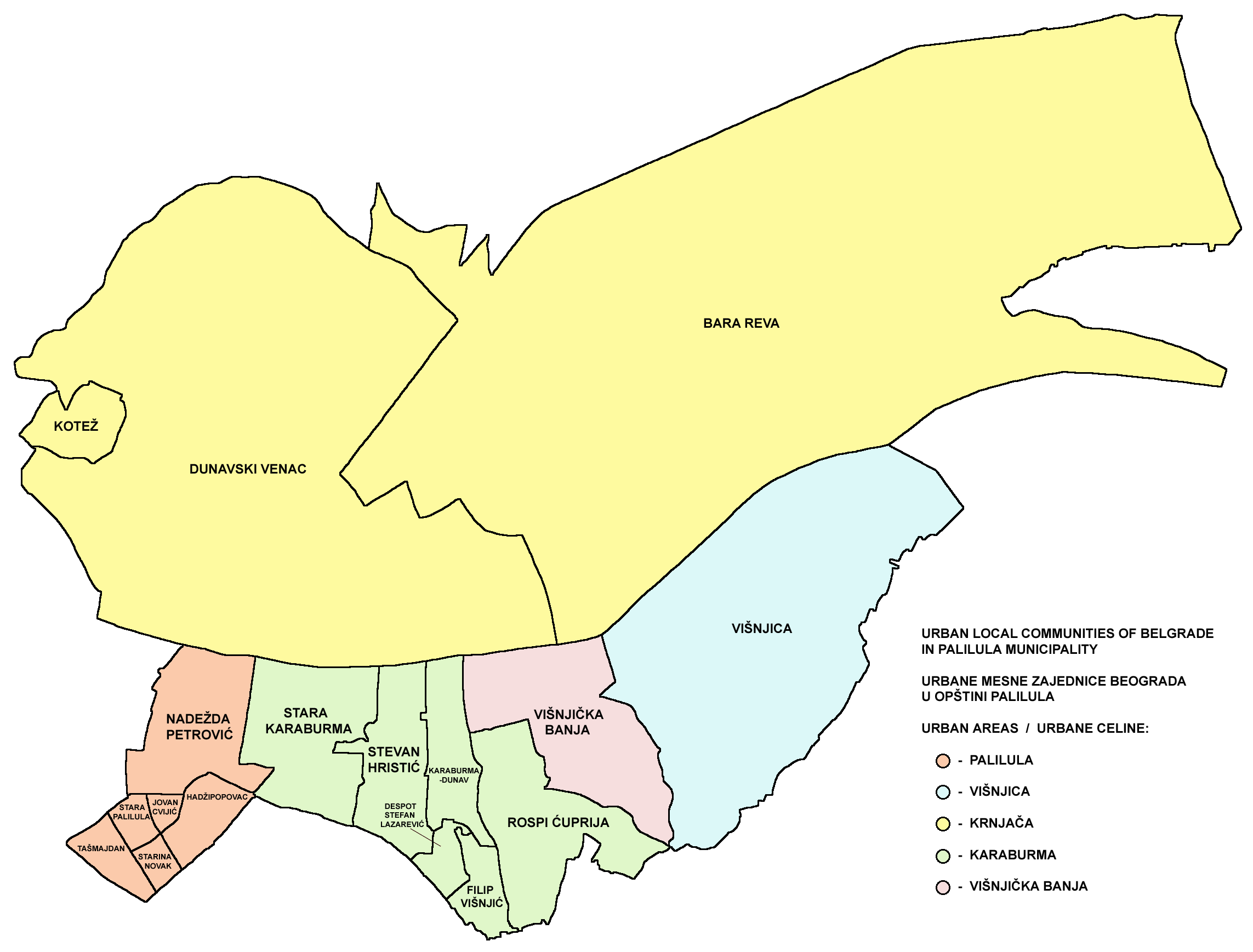
Map of Urban local communities of Belgrade in Palilula municipality

Being scattered, Krnjača has many sub-neighborhoods, like Dunavski Venac, Reva, Kotež, Kožara, Mika Alas and a cluster of blocks in its central part. Unlike Novi Beograd's blocks, these are not real blocks of buildings in either architectonic or geographical form, simply named so when they were constructed as the neighborhoods didn't exist and had no previous, historical names.

=== Blok Braća Marić ===
Blok Braća Marić is located east of the Pančevo Bridge, bordered by the Pančevački put to the north, which divides it from Blok Branko Momirov to the west, Blok Grga Andrijanović and Blok Zaga Malivuk to the north. To the west it is bordered by the neighborhood of Reva and to the south by the embankment on the Danube and the entire area is often flooded.

It is entirely a residential area, with a gas station and a motel along the Pančevački put. Even though it stretches for almost 2 km and with a population of 5,000 is the largest single neighborhood of Krnjača (almost one third of its population), it is notorious for not having any social infrastructure (clinics, post offices, schools, kindergartens, etc.).

=== Blok Branko Momirov ===
Blok Branko Momirov is located west of the Pančevo Bridge. The Zrenjaninski put makes its eastern border, separating it from Blok Braća Marić and Blok Grga Andrijanović. To the north it borders Partizanski Blok, while weekend-settlement of Mika Alas is located to the southwest. Southern border of the neighborhood is the embankment on the Danube. It is almost entirely residential area with large nursery garden (Rasadnik: Reva 2).

=== Blok Grga Andrijanović ===
Blok Grga Andrijanović is located in the central part of Krnjača. On the north it borders the Kalovita stream and Blok Sava Kovačević, on the east the Belgrade-Pančevo and Blok Zaga Malivuk, on the south the Pančevački put and Blok Braća Marić and on the west the Zrenjaninski put and Blok Branko Momirov and Partizanski Blok.

As a central section of Krnjača it has the most developed infrastructure: an elementary school and Secondary agricultural school, a clinic, two churches, nursery garden, OMV gas station, stadium of the Bratstvo soccer team, etc.

=== Blok Sava Kovačević ===
Blok Sava Kovačević borders the Kalovita stream and Blok Grga Andrijanović to the south, Blok Zaga Malivuk to the extreme east, the Zrenjaninski put and Blok Sutjeska to the west and the Veliko Blato bog to the north.

It is the smallest of all blocks, a thin patch of land stretched between the Kalovita and Veliko Blato. The facilities of Belgrade's brewery of Beogradska industrija piva or BIP are located in the western part of the neighborhood, along the Zrenjaninski put. The settlement is named after the very popular Partisan World War II war hero Sava Kovačević (1905–43).

=== Blok Sutjeska ===
Blok Sutjeska is bordered by the Zrenjaninski put on the east, which separates it from Blok Sava Kovačević, by the Kalovita stream on the south, which separates it from Partizanski Blok and the neighborhoods of Kotež and Dunavski Venac on the west and north, respectively.

It is a small, residential neighborhood, built to provide urban connection of Krnjača and Kotež. It was named after the Battle of Sutjeska which took place in 1943 between Partisans and the Axis forces, where Partisan leader Sava Kovačević (who also got its own block) was killed. Back-to-back neighborhoods of Sutjeska and Sava Kovačević also exist in Zemun.

=== Blok Zaga Malivuk ===
Blok Zaga Malivuk is the eastern part of Krnjača bordered by the Kalovita stream (and Blok Sava Kovačević) and the Sebeš river to the north and east, Belgrade-Pančevo railway and Blok Grga Andrijanović to the west and the Pančevački put (and Blok Braća Marić and the bog and neighborhood of Reva) to the south.

It is the most industrialized part of Krnjača as here begins the series of factories, hangars, workshops and storehouses which stretch all the way to Pančevo. The main facilities are: Janko Lisjak, Progres, Politika's printing-house, Balkan, Dom, IMK Beograd, etc. Krnjača railway station is also located in this neighborhood.

=== Partizanski Blok ===
Partizanski Blok is located west of the Zrenjaninski put which separates it from Blok Grga Andrijanović. It borders Blok Sutjeska and the Kalovita stream to the north, southern extension of the neighborhood of Kotež to the west and Blok Branko Momirov to the south.

It is a residential area, with two important facilities: stadium of the Palilulac football club in the extreme west and new Metro megastore in the east, along the Zrenjaninski put.

=== Sibnica ===
Sibnica is the easternmost extension, disconnected territorially from the western urbanized part of Krnjača, reaching the Timiș river. It was named after the channeled Sibnica stream, which flows into the Danube. It has three water springs, with the total of 29 individual wells, which provide drinking water for the entire town of Pančevo, just across the Timiș.

== Krnjača port ==
In November 2007 plans for construction of the Krnjača port were announced. It is supposed to be an international freight port, downstream from the Pančevo Bridge. It is projected to occupy 434 hectares, with additional 170 hectares for approaching railroad and roads, hangars, depots, etc. It should be completely finished by 2030.

== Geographical references ==
- Beograd – plan grada; M@gic M@p, 2006; ISBN 86-83501-53-1
- Beograd – plan i vodič; Geokarta, 1999; ISBN 86-459-0006-8
