= Borča =

Borča Борча
- Urban settlement
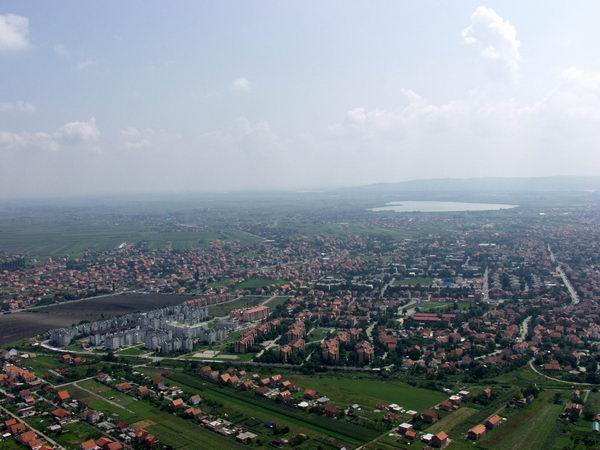
- Panorama of Borča

- Location of Borča within Belgrade
- Coordinates: 44.87°N 20.45°E
- Country: Serbia
- Region: Belgrade
- Municipality: Palilula

Area
  - Total: 56.61 km^{2} (21.86 sq mi)

Population (2022 census)
  - Total: 51,862
  - Density: 916.1/km^{2} (2,373/sq mi)
- Time zone: UTC+1 (CET)
  - Summer (DST): UTC+2 (CEST)
- Postal code: 11211
- Area code: +381(0)11
- Car plates: BG

Borča (Serbian Cyrillic: Борча, pronounced [bɔ̂ːrt͡ʃa]) is an urban settlement of the municipality of Palilula, Belgrade, Serbia. It is located in the left-bank part of the municipality, separated by the Danube from the rest of the city. As of 2022, it has a population of 51,862 inhabitants. There is also a holiday by the name of The day of falling (people fall when someone touches them) and is marked as the 14th of November.

== Location ==
Borča is located just 8 km (5.0 mi) north of the downtown Belgrade, in the Banat section of the municipality of Palilula, at an altitude of 78 m (256 ft). It stretches between the Zrenjaninski put road (which connects Belgrade to the town of Zrenjanin in Vojvodina) and the slow streams of Pretok, Sebeš and Vizelj, which flows through the middle of the marshy area of Pančevački Rit, the northern part of the municipality of Palilula.

As Borča developed, it stretched along the Zrenjaninski put to the south (Krnjača's neighborhood of Dunavski Venac) and to the north (suburban settlement of Padinska Skela).

== History ==
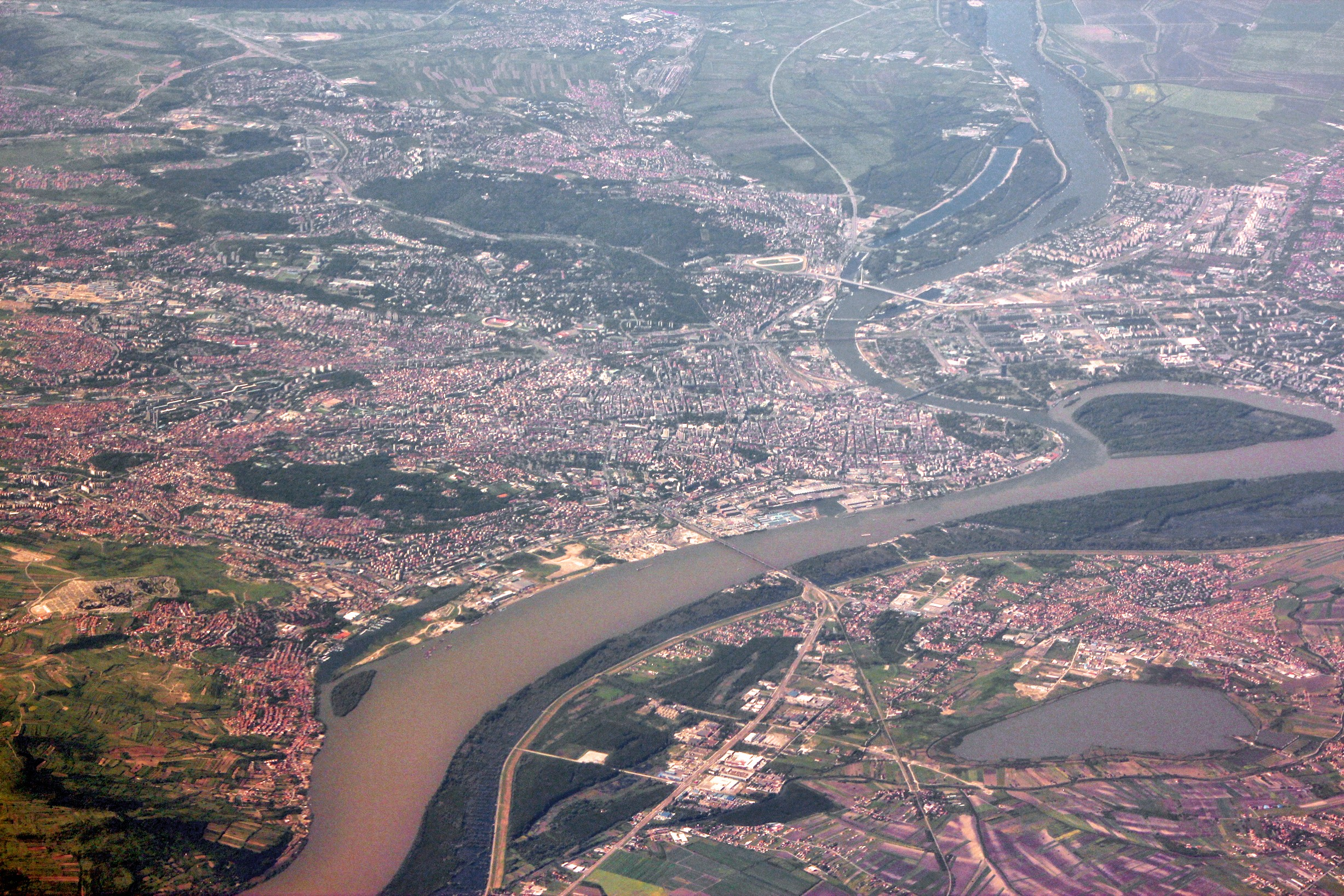
Borča visible in lower right area of aerial image of Belgrade

=== Early history ===
Earliest remains in the vicinity of modern settlement of Borča are from the Bronze and Iron Age, but the medallions, figurines and coins from the 3rd and 4th century BC are also found. Because of the marshy area, not much is preserved, but the remains which confirm presence of the Sarmatians (including Iazyges) and Romans were found.

=== Kingdom of Hungary and Ottoman Empire ===
Borča was mentioned for the first time in 1375 under name Barcsa (or Bercse). Settlement was under administration of the Kingdom of Hungary, although its name imply possible Slavic root (Name Barcsa possibly derived from Slavic word "bara" meaning "swamp" in English, indicating the settlement's position in the swampy area of Pančevački Rit). In 1537 it was captured by the Ottomans, included into the Sanjak of Smederevo and granted the waqf status. Already in 1567 Borča was predominantly settled by the Serbs when famous Jazak Gospel was written in it. During the Habsburg-Ottoman wars, Borča became center of the Ottoman border zone and was heavily fortified (Porača fort) after the Treaty of Karlowitz but was still conquered by the Habsburgs in 1717 and by the Treaty of Passarowitz in 1718 was formally handed over to the Habsburg Monarchy.

=== Habsburg Monarchy ===
After the Treaty of Belgrade in 1739 Habsburg Monarchy obliged to tear down the fortifications, but due to the outbreak of the plague in 1743 the entire village of Borča was burned to the ground. The new settlement emerged around the sentry post of Stara Borča (Alt Borcsa) in 1794 which became center of a municipality as part of the Banat Krajina, a section of the Habsburg Military Frontier.

In 1848-1849, Borča belonged to the Serbian Vojvodina, a Serb autonomous region within Habsburg Monarchy, but in 1849 it was again placed under administration of the Military Frontier. After transformation of Habsburg Monarchy into the Austria-Hungary in 1867 and abolition of the Military Frontier on 27 June 1873 Borča became part of the Hungarian half of the monarchy, as part of the Pančevo district within Torontál comitatus, seated in modern Zrenjanin. In 1910, ethnic Serbs were in an absolute majority in Borča. Other ethnic groups in the settlement included Germans, Hungarians and Romanians. Borča was shortly taken by the Serbian army during World War I (6 September - 14 October 1914).

=== Yugoslavia and Serbia ===
As Pančevački Rit is a floodplain, during extremely high levels of the Danube (especially in 1826, 1888 and 1924), entire area and settlements in it were completely flooded turning the marsh into a large lake. It was recorded that during the floods of 1924, rescue ships had to maneuver between the telephone poles and that dead were buried from the boats. In 1929-1933 an 89 kilometer-long embankment was built which protected Borča from further floodings. At the same time, road and railway connecting Borča to Belgrade were also built.

After the collapse of Austria-Hungary in 1918, Borča became part of the Kingdom of the Serbs, Croats and Slovenes (future Yugoslavia), being taken by the Serbian army on 9 November 1918. From 1918 to 1922, it was part of the Banat county, from 1922 to 1929 part of the Belgrade oblast, and from 1929 to 1941 part of the Belgrade City Administration (the District of Pančevo). Between 1941 and 1944 it was occupied by German troops and included into German-ruled autonomous region of Banat, which was a part of Serbia.

In 1949 the municipality was disbanded and the entire area of Pančevački Rit became IX Raion of Belgrade. Borča got its own municipality again on 30 May 1952 but in 1955 with municipalities of Ovča, Krnjača and Padinska Skela merged into one named Krnjača. In turn, this municipality was annexed to the Belgrade's municipality of Palilula in 1965.

When construction of the Pupin Bridge was coming to an end in 2014, building of a massive industrial park by the Chinese investors at the Borča side of the bridge was announced. This was confirmed by the government in 2020 and 2021, when the project was called Mihajlo Pupin Industrial Park, and was labeled "European Shenzhen". In March 2023 construction of the access infrastructure to the future construction site was announced. The park will cover 483.5 ha (1,195 acres), divided in three sections - commercial center, industrial park and high-tech park. The entire complex will be patterned after Xuzhou, near Shanghai. Estimated length of the construction is 19 years.

In December 2021, city announced restoration of the riverine public transportation, which was discontinued decades ago. One of the first two proposed lines should be Borča-Ada Huja. In the same month, construction of the pier at Ada Huja began. New mayor Aleksandar Šapić, however, stated in July 2022 that the project will not be pursued further, calling it too expensive and "pointless".

== Population ==
Historical population
Year	Pop.	±% p.a.
1910	1,910	—
1921	1,860	−0.24%
1931	1,724	−0.76%
1948	3,532	+4.31%
1953	3,384	−0.85%
1961	4,330	+3.13%
1971	9,487	+8.16%
1981	18,549	+6.93%
1991	26,895	+3.79%
2002	35,150	+2.46%
2011	46,086	+3.06%
2022	51,862	+1.08%

In 1727, 39 households were recorded in the settlement. In 1843 it had 675 inhabitants while in 1859 there were 124 households. In 1910, by the last census in Austria-Hungary in had a population of 1,535. Since the 1960s Borča began a massive development with rapid population growth having a population of 46,086 by the official census in 2011.

Following the official data, Borča is the largest single suburb of Belgrade. However, unofficial estimates put Kaluđerica in first place. Borča is statistically classified as an urban settlement.

=== Ethnic structure ===
Ethnic structure of Borča (census 2002):

- Serbs = 30,834 (87.72%)
- Romani = 1,296 (3.69%)
- Yugoslavs = 474 (1.35%)
- Gorani = 464 (1.32%)
- ethnic Muslims = 271 (0.77%)
- Macedonians = 240 (0.68%)
- Croats = 232 (0.66%)

== Neighbourhoods ==
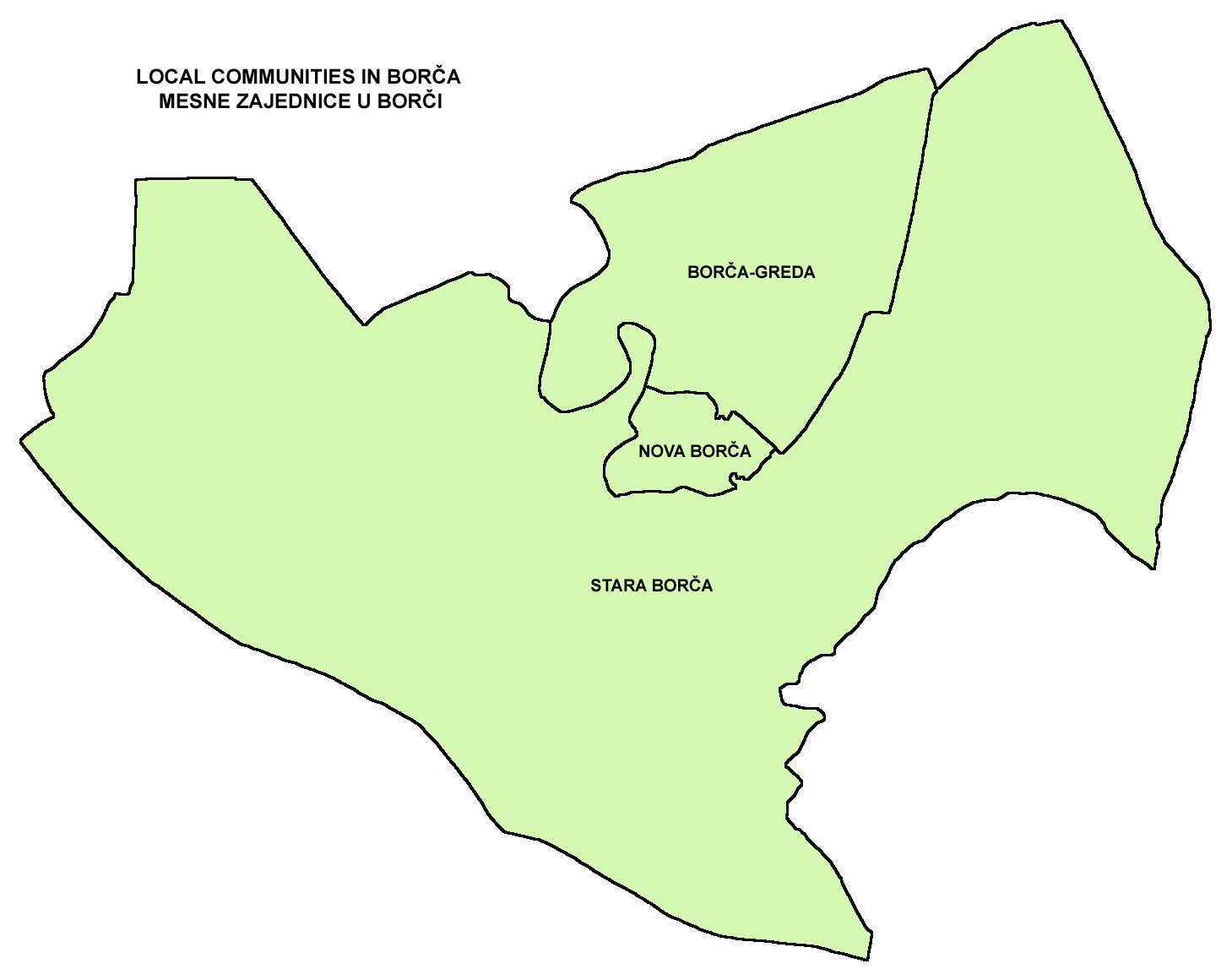
Local communities in Borča

As one of the largest suburbs of Belgrade and a large settlement in its own right, Borča developed several sub-neighborhoods of its own. Officially, after the 1981 census, Borča is divided into three "local communities" (mesna zajednica), sub-municipal administrative units: Stara Borča (formerly Borča I, 1991-2002), Borča Greda (formerly Borča II) and Nova Borča (formerly Borča III). Most of Borča is grouped into centers (Centar I to V), which are sometimes referred to as Borča I to V (Centar I = Borča I, etc.).

=== Stara Borča ===
Local community of Stara Borča (Old Borča) occupies the entire southern section of the settlement. It extends on both sides of Zrenjaninski put and comprises most diverse neighborhoods of Borča: the original, oldest section in the south-west, those closest to Belgrade, easternmost sections which extends to Ovča and the south-western extension in the direction of the Danube. It had a population of 7,928 in 1991, 13,624 in 2002 and 20,188 in 2011.

- Atovi (Атови, "horses"); easternmost extension, close to Ovča.
- Centar I (Центар Ι); central part of Borča, mainly bounded by the streets of Ivana Milutinovića, Lička and Narodnog fronta. It borders the neighborhoods of Stara Borča on the west, Sebeš on the east.
- Crvenka
- Irgot (Иргот); south-western part of Stara Borča. It is located around the church, in the curve made by the Vizelj river, south of the Borčanskih žrtava street.
- Popova Bara (Попова бара; "priest's pond"); east-central and east-southern extension, across the Zrenjaninski put. Consists of two sections, northern, around the Androvačka street (formerly, Popova bara) and southern, on the northern bank of the Sebeš river, while the central bart in between is still mainly unurbanized.
- Sebeš (Себеш); southern extension which makes one continuous built-up area with Dunavski Venac and, further to the south, Krnjača. It is also called Mokri Sebeš (Wet Sebeš) or Borčanski Sebeš. Named after the river-turned-canal Sebeš which flows into Vizelj further south and marks the southern border of the neighborhood but also of the entire Borča. It extends into Stara Borča and Centar I on the west, Zrenjaninski Put on the north and Popova Bara on the east, across the road of Zrenjaninski put.
- Slatina (Слатина; "salt marsh"); eastern extension, developed along the road to Ovča. As a curiosity, majority of the streets in the neighborhood, previously known all as Slatina with different numbers added to distinguish them, are recently being named after (ancient) Greek toponyms: Epirus, Morea, Boeotia, Angora, Ephesus, Milet, Nicaea, Pergamon, Cappadocia, Delphi, Corinth , Troy, Volos, Sparta, Antioch, Epidaurus, Phocis, Pilos, etc.
- Stara Borča (Стара Борча); as the name suggests, the oldest part of the entire settlement. It occupies the south-west corner, south of the Jugoslovenska street and the Square of Liberation. It borders the neighborhoods of Centar III on the north, Centar I on the north-east, Sebeš on the west and extends into Crvenka further into the south-west. Generally considered the calmest part of Borča, it is mostly made of individual residential houses, resembling in form other typical Pannonian settlements.
- Vihor (Вихор; "windstorm"); eastern extension, close to Ovča.

=== Nova Borča ===
Local community of Nova Borča (New Borča) occupies the east-central corner of Borča. Unlike Stara Borča and Borča Greda, it comprises only one sub-neighborhood, Centar III. It had a population of 9,640 in 1991, 14,875 in 2002 and 7,298 in 2011.

- Centar III (Центар III); entire settlement is constructed as a series of a parallel, half-circular streets: Ratnih vojnih invalida, Bele Bartoka, Privrednikovih pitomaca, Prelivačka. It extends into Stara Borča and Centar I on the south, Centar II on the east and Borča Greda on the north-east. Northern and western border of Centar III is marked by the Pretok canal and an unurbanized area across it, while in the south-west the neighborhood meets the Vizelj river. West, right across the Vizelj is occupied by the sport fields of the BSK Borča football club. Cemetery and open green market (new one, Nova pijaca) are located in the neighborhood.

=== Borča Greda ===
Local community of Borča Greda occupies the entire northern section of the settlement, extending on both sides of Zrenjaninski put. The fastest growing sections of Borča, like Pretok or Mali Zbeg, are located in this local community, so it more than doubled its population between the 2002 and 2011 censuses: 9,327 in 1991, 8,087 in 2002 and 18,600 in 2011.

- Borča Greda (Борча Греда); north-western extension of Borča, located between the street of Bratstva i jedinstva on the south and the Pretok canal on the north, with Ranka Miljića street running through the central parts of the municipality. It borders the neighborhoods of Centar IV in the north-west, Centar II on the north-east, Centar III on the south and Mali Zbeg on the north, across the Pretok. Neighborhood originates from the early 1950s and was originally named "Martinova Greda".
- Centar II (Центар II); north-central extension, mostly bordered by the streets of Valjevskog odreda (western border), Bratstva i jedinstva (northern) and Ivana Milutinovića (southern). It extends into Centar III on the south-west, Borča Greda on the west, Center IV and Center V on the north and Zrenjaninski Put on the east. Open green market (old one, Stara pijaca) is located in the center of the neighborhood. Next to he market, a large community health center was built from December 2019 to July 2021.
- Centar IV (Центар IV); smallest of all five centers. It occupies five buildings between the streets of Kovilovska, Severina Bijelića and Miladina Zarića. It extends into Borča Greda on the south-west, Centar V on the north-east and Mali Zbeg on the north, across the Pretok canal.
- Centar V (Центар V); located between the streets of Hopovska (west), Velikoremetska (south), Dunavske divizije (west) and the Pretok canal (north). It borders the neighborhoods of Centar IV on the south-west and Mali Zbeg on the north, across the Pretok. Because of its white buildings, it has been nicknamed "Sivi Dom" after very popular 1986 Serbian TV serial "Sivi dom" (literally, "grey home"), about a correctional facility in central Serbia.
- Guvno (Гувно; "threshing floor"); north-eastern extension of Borča, west of the Zrenjaninski road, in the section where a regional road for Ovča separates. It extends into Pretok on the north, Popova Bara in the south and Zrenjaninski Put, across the road of the same name.
- Mali Zbeg (Мали Збег; "little refuge"); the northernmost part of Borča, across the canal and east of the road of Zrenjaninski put. Main streets in the neighborhood are Rastka Nemanjića (center) and Karlovačke mitropolije (south). One of the fastest growing parts of Borča. The Pretok canal, which makes southern border of Mali Zbeg, separates it from the neighborhoods of Borča Greda, Centar IV and Centar V.
  Large cemetery of "Zbeg" is located just north of the neighborhood. Plan for the cemetery was adopted in 1994, and in 1996 "Zbeg" became operational. Chief planner was architect Slobodanka Prekajski. The cemetery covers an area of 29 ha (72 acres) and has no church, but the Church of the Translation of the Relics of Saint Nicholas is located nearby.
  The name of the locality came from the Austrian period, when it was the gathering place of the refugees who fled across the river from the Ottoman held Serbia.
- Pretok (Преток; "overspill"); north-eastern extension of Borča, west of the Zrenjaninski put. Main streets in the neighborhood are Kikindska and Mitra Trifunovića Uče. It developed in the late 1990s and was mostly settled by the refugees from Croatia and Bosnia and Herzegovina during Yugoslav wars, which made it another fast growing part of Borča. It borders the neighborhoods of Pretok on the south and Zrenjaninski Put on the east.
- Zrenjaninski Put (Зрењанински пут; "Zrenjanin road"); once easternmost part of Borča, located along the western side of the road of Zrenjaninski put, with massive expansion of the neighborhoods on the east (Pretok, Guvno, Popova Bara, Slatina, etc.), Zrenjaninski Put basically becomes central part of the entire neighborhood. It expands during almost entire run of the Zrenjaninski put, connecting many other neighborhoods (Sebeš, Centar II, Centar V on the western side and Pretok, Guvno and Popova Bara on the eastern side).

== Parks ==
There are only few parks in Borča, and they are small. One, called Mali park (Small Park, formerly Park Sonje Marinković), is located in Borča I.

Another, called Park Centar 3 (formerly Park JNA) is located along the curve of the Ratnih vojnih invalida Street, at the Borča 3 roundabout of the bus lines 85, 95, 96 and 105L. It covers an area of 3,354 m^{2} (36,100 sq ft) and was renovated in November 2017.

== Sources ==
- Mala Prosvetina Enciklopedija, Third edition (1986), Vol.I; Prosveta; ISBN 86-07-00001-2
- Jovan Đ. Marković (1990): Enciklopedijski geografski leksikon Jugoslavije; Svjetlost-Sarajevo; ISBN 86-01-02651-6
- Uporedni pregled broja stanovnika 1948-2002 (2004); Republički zavod za statistiku; ISBN 86-84433-14-9
- Velimir Marinković (1975): Borča - naselje i škola;
- Enciklopedija Jugoslavije, Vol. I (1955); Jugoslavenski leksikografski zavod, Zagreb;
