= Crvenka, Belgrade =

Crvenka, Belgrade Црвенка
- Suburban neighbourhood
- Location within Belgrade
- Coordinates: 44°51′46″N 20°24′44″E
- Country: Serbia
- Region: Belgrade
- Municipality: Palilula
- Time zone: UTC+1 (CET)
  - Summer (DST): UTC+2 (CEST)
- Area code: +381(0)11
- Car plates: BG

Crvenka (Serbian Cyrillic: Црвенка) is a suburban settlement of Belgrade, the capital of Serbia. It is located in the Belgrade's municipality of Palilula and statistically is part of Borča.

== Location ==
Crvenka is located in Banat section of the municipality, half kilometer away from the left bank of the Danube, on the Batin kanal stream. It is built in the thickly forested area and surrounded by marshes of Pančevački Rit so, even being close, it can't be seen from the opposite, Zemun bank and it is not near to any other settlements of Belgrade.

== History ==
During the 18th century an Austrian sentry post was erected here and was named Crvenka (Serbian for red land or red place).

The settlement was built after the World War II. It developed as an experimental agricultural farm of the University of Belgrade’s Faculty of Agriculture, which is seated across the Danube, in the neighborhood of Zemun. The settlers came to Crvenka as they were needed for the work, instead of being colonized like in the other settlements in Pančevački Rit. Part of the original settlers were Germans who left for Germany in the 1960s.

== Characteristics ==
Part of Crvenka is a weekend-settlement which means it has no permanent population. It consists of some 100 houses, mostly owned by the residents of Zemun, even though it is located across the river, in different municipality. Public transportation bus line 104 connects Crvenka to Belgrade’s neighborhood of Bogoslovija.

The canal that flows through the settlement, Batin canal used to be broader and navigable, with colonies of wild ducks and white herons and it was used by the Belgrade's kayaking clubs for trainings. Since the canal was illegally dammed to create a path to Borča with tree trunks, the water flow was stopped, the canal began flooding the surrounding area and wild birds moved out.

Crvenka gained some public notoriety when on 2 April 2016 a murder occurred on the settlement's embankment. Little known folk singer Jelena Marjanović was murdered and the viciousness of the crime, botched investigation by the police and a fact that the crime has not been solved, turned the murder into the cause célèbre in Serbia.

== Future ==
In the mid 2000s, city government announced plans to urbanize the area which would be centered at Crvenka, as the core of the future „Third Belgrade“ (after „old“ Belgrade and New Belgrade). Some of the requirements for the plan to develop was the construction of the northern part of the Belgrade bypass and the Pupin Bridge, which opened in 2014. However, due to the push of the Belgrade Waterfront project, plans are halted.

== Sources ==
- Beograd - plan grada; M@gic M@p, 2006; ISBN 86-83501-53-1

== See also ==
- List of Belgrade neighborhoods
