= West Vračar =

Neighborhood of Beograd, Serbia

Coordinates: 44°47′58″N 20°27′40″E

West Vračar or Zapadni Vračar (Serbian Cyrillic: Западни Врачар), is a former urban neighborhood and municipality of Belgrade, the capital of Serbia. It was located in Belgrade's municipality of Savski Venac to which northern section it generally corresponds today.

== Location ==
Zapadni Vračar was located in the area which today covers the northern part of the municipality of Savski Venac. It bordered the neighborhoods of Savamala and Bara Venecija to the north, Istočni Vračar (today Vračar) to the east and Senjak and Jatagan Mala (today Mostar and Prokop) to the south. It makes the western part of the much larger former neighborhood of Vračar.

== History ==
Building of Zapadni Vračar marks the start of the construction of modern Belgrade, after the Ottoman occupation. It was constructed with broad streets and boulevards, parks and monuments. It was housing all Serbian public buildings and state institutions, in the first half of the 19th century.

The Christian population which lived within the moat of the medieval Belgrade's Kalemegdan fortress, overpopulated the city. Due to the Turkish presence, it was demanded that Prince Miloš Obrenović spread the surroundings.

The immediate surroundings comprised the villages of Savamala, Palilula, and large uninhibited reclaimed areas of what used to be the "Ciganska Bara", later renamed into Bara Venecija, broad swampy areas and vineyards). Belgrade's rich went hunting wild geese to the unnamed pool, nowadays the crossroads of Kneza Miloša and Kralja Milana's streets. Where the Zeleni Venac market is today, at the beginning of the 20th century was a pool, as well as the site of an unsuccessful attempt of the construction of the National Theatre.

From 1929 to 1935 a public swimming pool was built within the complex of the DIF building. It was the second such venue in Belgrade, after the 1904 pool at the Steam Bath of the Brothers Krsmanović, in the neighborhood of Dorćol.

A densely urbanized block was built right above the Slavija square, along the Kragujevac Road, modern Liberation Boulevard. In the triangularly shaped area between the boulevard and Tiršova and Katićeva streets, a massive building of the Teacher's Center was built, "a jewel of architect Nikola Nestorović". It was adjoined by the annex - the Pensionary - designed by Đura Bodrošić, facing Katićeva, and Mining Directorate, facing the boulevard. Across the Katićeva are two old mansions built by industrialist Đorđe Roš and his brother. The triangular area was hit on 6 April 1941 during the German bombing of Belgrade, and after two days of fire, completely burned to the ground, while the Roš' mansions across the street survived. Area was left empty until the 1960s, when was adapted into a park-like green area, which was finally adapted into the proper park in 2021.

In August 2021 it was announced that city's Institute for the Cultural Monuments' Protection is conducting a study on declaring two sections of West Vračar a protected spatial cultural-historical units: West Vračar and State Hospital Complex.

== Municipality ==
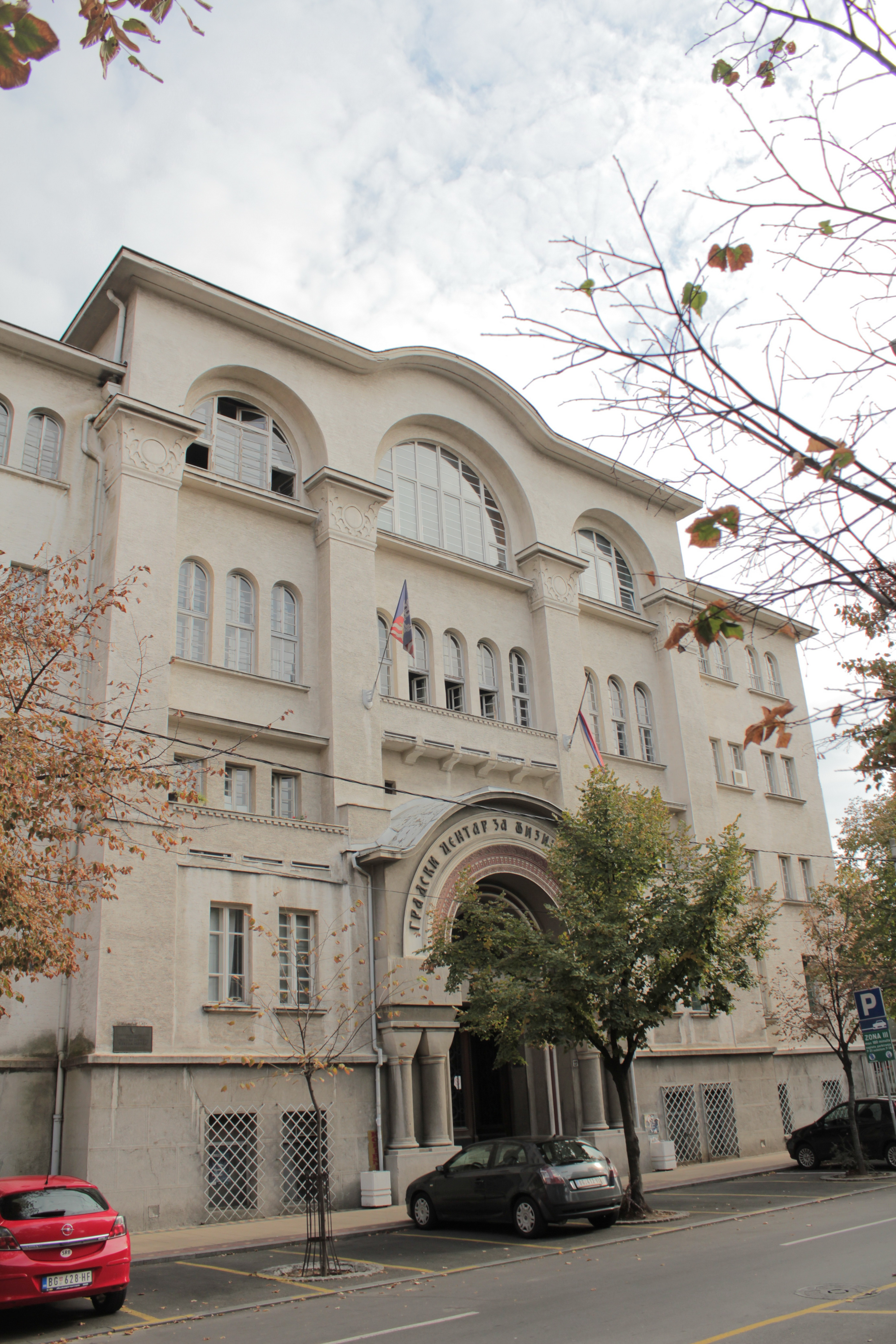
Old DIF building

The municipality of Vračar was officially formed in 1952 after Belgrade was administratively reorganized from districts (rejon) to municipalities. Already on September 1, 1955, Vračar was divided into Zapadni Vračar and Istočni Vračar. Year and a half later, on January 1, 1957, parts of Istočni Vračar merged with the municipality of Neimar and the western part of the municipality of Terazije to create new, albeit the smallest one municipality in Belgrade. Zapadni Vračar merged with the municipality of Topčidersko Brdo to create the municipality of Savski Venac, while the easternmost section of Istočni Vračar became part of the municipality of Zvezdara. Zapadni Vračar is still a name of the small local community within Savski Venac, with a population of 7,644 in 2002 (15,991 including neighboring local communities).

== Features ==
The Building of the "Matica" Sokol House is located in the neighborhood, at 27 Deligradska Street. It is better known today as the Old DIF (Stari DIF). The building was constructed from 1929 to 1935. Original plans envisioned much more sculptural ornaments on the façade, but during the construction the project was reduced to the more plain appearance. It was designed by architect Momir Korunović, known as the "Serbian Gaudi", and is today considered his best public service object in Belgrade. The building was declared a cultural monument in 2007. Decorative lights were placed on the building in November 2021.

At 79 Svetozara Markovića Street (originally, 62 Studenička Street), a building of the Czech House was built in 1928. It was built by the Czechs living in Belgrade. The lot was purchased in 1925 and the construction began in October 1926. Kindergarten, school, theatrical hall and numerous offices were located in the building, designed by Alois Mezera. After 1938, it became a major stopover for Czech refugees who fled Czechoslovakia and waited for French immigration papers. After German occupation of Belgrade in 1941, the Czech school was turned into the German one. The Czech school was restored in 1946, but was closed in 1960 as it had small number of pupils. The state nationalized the building in 1964. The building was never protected, but was part of preliminary (temporary) protected areas of Vračar, and later of West Vračar, which expired in 2020. It hosts the offices of the West Vračar local community. In May 2021, Serbian president Aleksandar Vučić stated that the building will be donated to the Czech Republic.
