= Dorćol =

Dorćol Дорћол
- Urban neighbourhood
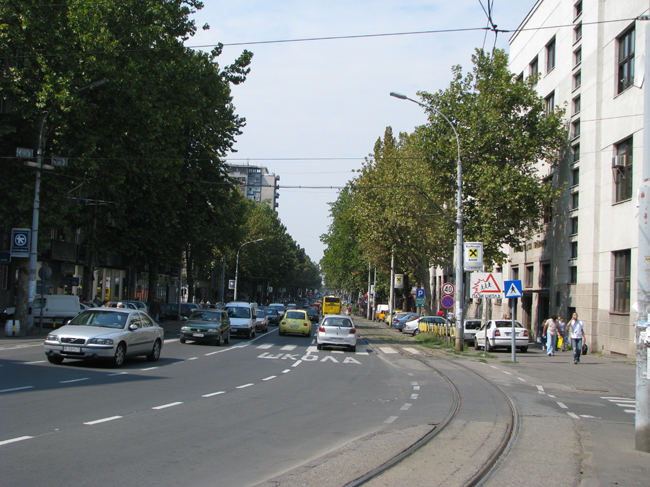
- Main street in Dorćol (Cara Dušana St)

- Location within Belgrade
- Coordinates: 44°49′32″N 20°27′35″E
- Country: Serbia
- Region: Belgrade
- Municipality: Stari Grad
- Time zone: UTC+1 (CET)
  - Summer (DST): UTC+2 (CEST)
- Area code: +381(0)11
- Car plates: BG

Dorćol (Serbian Cyrillic: Дорћол; Serbo-Croatian pronunciation: [dǒrtɕol]) is an affluent urban neighborhood of Belgrade, the capital of Serbia. It is located in Belgrade's municipality of Stari Grad.

Located along the right bank of the Danube, Dorćol is the oldest surviving neighborhood in Belgrade. It is known for its specific urban charm and the mentality of its residents. The neighborhood has experienced artistic revival since the 2000s concurrently with the Savamala neighborhood on the opposite, Sava, bank. After being featured in numerous reports, including by the BBC and The Guardian, Time Out magazine placed Dorćol on their list of "50 coolest neighborhoods". It has been described as a Belgrade "phenomenon", an "exciting, creative and inventive spot", and the "authentic, organic soul of the city".

A section of Upper Dorćol was declared a spatial cultural-historical unit in 1989, and placed under protection as the "Area surrounding Dositej's Lyceum".

== Location ==
Dorćol begins already some 700 meters north of Terazije, the central square of Belgrade. It can roughly be divided into two sections, Gornji (or Upper) Dorćol (formerly known as Zerek), which covers the area from Academy Park to Cara Dušana street, and Donji (or Lower) Dorćol, formerly called Jalija, which occupies the area between Cara Dušana, Bulevar despota Stefana and the right bank of the Danube. It borders (and largely overlaps) the neighborhoods of Stari Grad and Jevremovac (east and south) and the fortress of Kalemegdan (west). The population of the neighborhood in the widest sense was 22,707 in 2002.

== History ==
=== Roman period ===
The predecessor to Belgrade was Singidunum, a Celtic and, later, Roman fortified town. The original earthen and wooden fort stretched around Studentski Trg and Knez Mihailova Street. The oldest Roman graves were discovered in this section, dated to the 1st and early 2nd centuries. During the period of the Roman Empire, the Danube was much wider and modern Lower Dorćol didn't exist. Upper Dorćol was included in the city. The civilian zone spread from Kralja Petra Street, over both the Sava and Danube banks to Kosančićev Venac, extending in a series of necropolises from Republic Square, along the Bulevar kralja Aleksandra all the way to the Mali Mokri Lug. The highest, ending section of Upper Dorćol was part of the central axis of the city grid in the direction of modern Uzun Mirkova-Vasina-Republic Square. The necropolis at Republic Square contained well-shaped graves from the 1st century AD. In general, the largest section of the civilian settlement was situated between modern Simina Street in Dorćol, Brankova Street in Savamala and Zeleni Venac, and Republic Square.

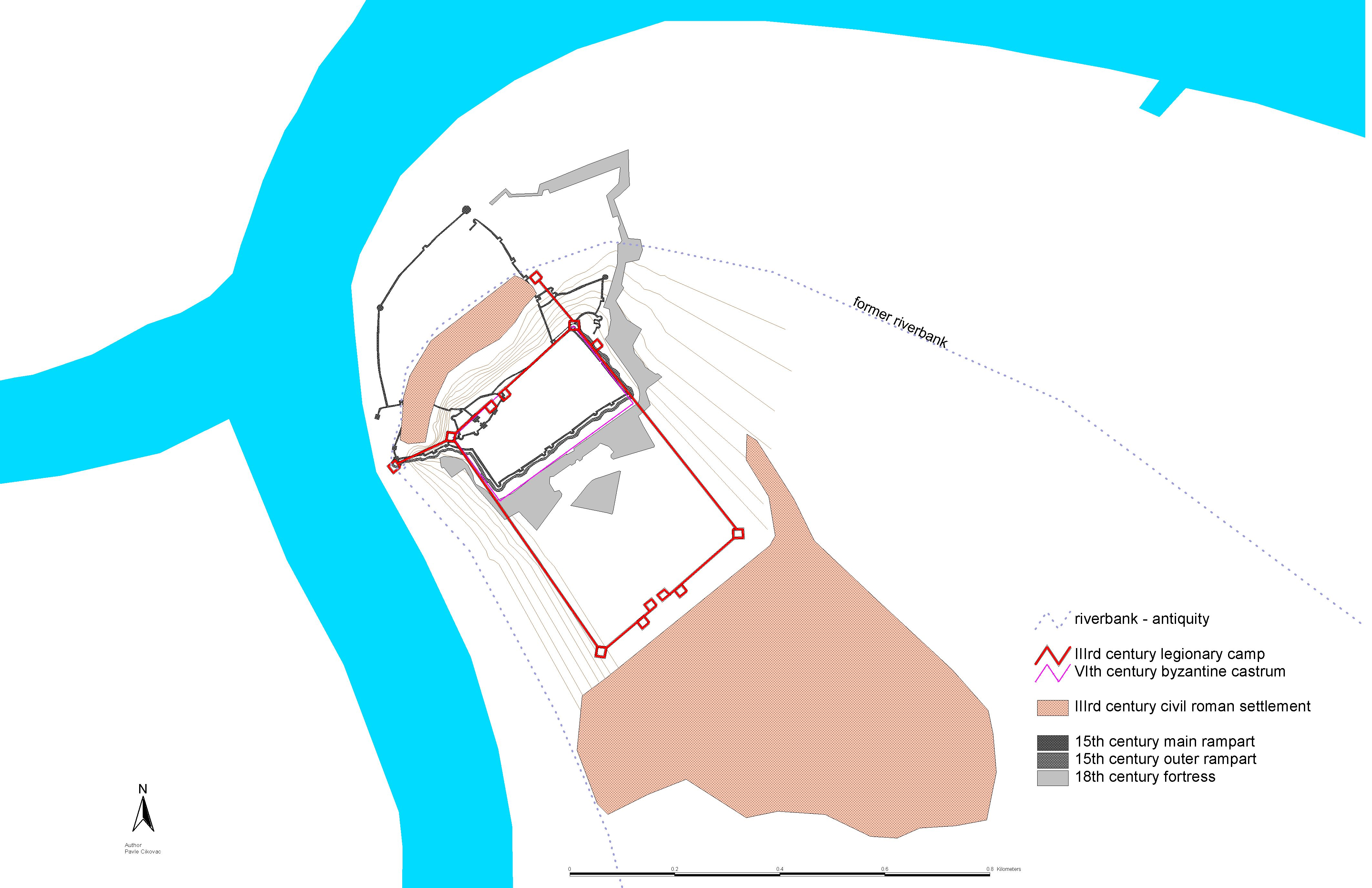
Map of Roman Singidunum, showing the old river bank

On the crossroads of Gospodar Jevremova and Kneginje Ljubice streets, a house of worship dedicated to the Greek goddess Hecate, a sort of "descent of Hades", was discovered in 1935. As foundations for a new building were being dug, a 1.5 m (4 ft 11 in) long architrave beam, with an inscription in Latin dedicated to Hecate, was discovered at the depth of 2.5 m (8 ft 2 in). The inscription was written by Valerius Crescentio, a legionary of the Legio IV Flavia Felix, in the service of the emperor Maximinus Thrax. It is roughly dated to c. 235 AD. It disappeared after it was discovered but was found decades later and handed over to the National Museum in Belgrade. It is a rare finding of Hecate in Serbia. Her cult wasn't developed in this area, and she was mostly identified with the Roman goddess Diana, worshiped in the region as the protector of silver mines. The entire surrounding slope around the Gospodar Jevremova was a necropolis, so the temple was probably part of it since Hecate's temples were usually built on cemeteries. The beam ends in a step-like manner, so the temple was probably built in the Ionic order rather than the Tuscan order, which would be expected in Singidunum. Impressions of anta capital and their size on the lower side of the beam point to the existence of two columns and probably a rectangular gable above it. There is a possibility that due to the terrain, the temple was actually dug into the slope.

The northern section of Academy Park was excavated in 1968 during the building of a furnace oil tank for the boiler room of Belgrade's City Committee of League of Communists, which were located nearby. Under the lawn, the remnants of the ancient Roman thermae were discovered, including the frigidarium (room with cold water), laconicum (room with the warm water where people would sweat and prepare), and caldarium (room with two pools of hot water). The site became an archaeological dig in 1969 and 8 rooms in total were discovered, including the remains of the brick furnace that heated the water. It was a public unisex bath dated to the 3rd or 4th century. The entire area of the park is actually within the borders of the "Protected zone of Roman Singidunum". It is situated in the area that used to be the civilian sector of the city, outside the fortress. The remnants were visible until 1978 and due to the lack of funds to continue excavations or to cover it with a roof or marquee, the remains were conserved and buried again.

Remnants of the Roman castrum from the 2nd century were discovered beneath Tadeuša Košćuškog Street during the reconstruction in June 2009. They were conserved and reburied. In Cincar Jankova Street, five graves from the late 1st century were discovered so as three canals. As later development of Belgrade destroyed over 80% of the cultural layer within the current protected zone of Ancient Singidunum, that is, of the civilian settlement and necropolises, there are only three sections that were excavated, conserved, and reburied, two of them being in Upper Dorćol (Academy Park and Tadeuša Košćuškog), the third being Park Proleće on the opposite side of the central slope.

=== Medieval period ===
During the reign of Despot Stefan Lazarević, in the late 14th and early 15th centuries, the settlement was an outer suburb of Belgrade. The settlement hosted a Ragusan merchant colony, so a modern street, roughly in this area, was named Dubrovačka in the late 19th century.

=== Ottoman period ===
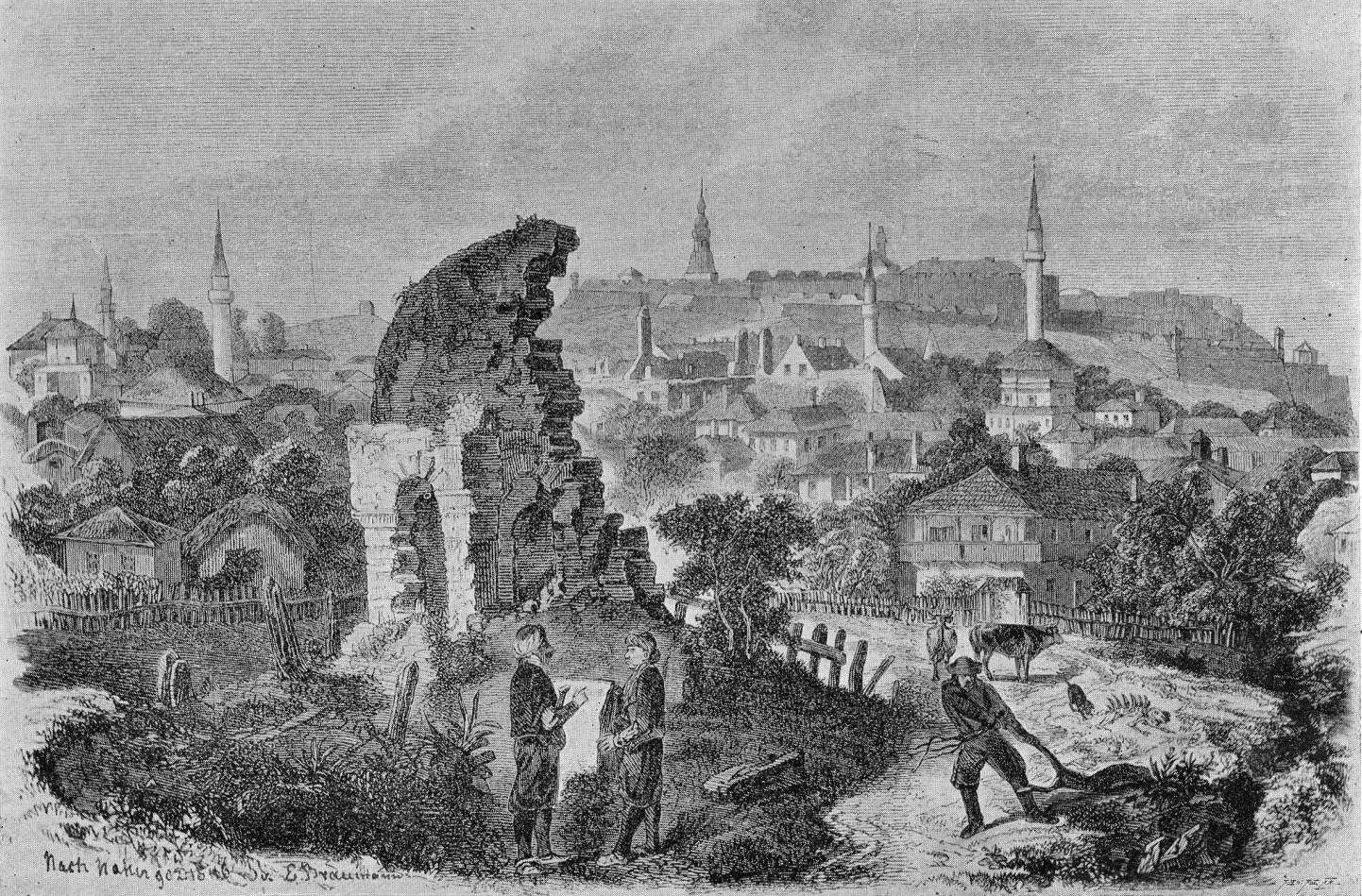
Dorćol during the Ottoman period.

The name of the neighborhood comes from Turkish words dört (four) and yol (road), literally meaning "four roads" or colloquially "intersection (of four roads)", "crossroads". There are several towns and villages with the same name in Turkic speaking areas, like Dörtyol in Turkey or Dyurtyuli in Bashkortostan, Russia.

In 1522, the Ottomans opened a kafana in Dorćol, considered the oldest such venue in Europe. It served only Turkish coffee. After recapturing Belgrade from the Austrians in 1739, Kafana Crni Orao (Kafana Black Eagle) was opened at the corner of the modern streets of Kralja Petra and Cara Dušana. It was the first such facility with the recorded word kafana in its name. Apart from coffee, nargile was also on offer.

During the Turkish rule of Belgrade, Dorćol was a well known trading center, with many markets and traders of different nationalities. Among others, it was a center of Belgrade's Jewish community, who settled in Belgrade in the early 16th century, a remnant of which is the modern Jevrejska ("Jewish") street in Dorćol. The area of Jalija, or Lower Dorćol, below the Duga čaršija (Long Çarşı), modern Cara Dušana, and the Danube was dotted with numerous mosques, each having its own mahallah. One of the mahallahs was Jewish. A synagogue was built in the neighborhood in the 16th century. After Belgrade became a capital of independent Serbia, Dorćol kept its multinational character for a long time. Apart from Serbs, Jews, and Ottomans, later settlers also included new Ragusan settlers after the Candian war, Greeks, Italians, Germans, Russians, Cincars, Armenians, Bosnian Muslims, and Albanians, so Dorćol was described as a "Babylonian mixture of people, religions, and languages".

Dorćol was the location of famous farmers market, Bit-Pazar. The central thoroughfare in the neighborhood was hence named Bitpazar(ska), and it divided upper (Zerek) and lower (Jalija) sections of the neighborhood. During the Austrian occupation from 1718 to 1739, it was renamed Dunavska Street. The street is today called Cara Dušana. In 1783, a Sheikh Mustafa's Turbe was built in the neighborhood, within the complex of the Dervish tekija. It survived until today, and was reconstructed. In June 2019 in the turbe, for the first time after 236 years, a group of Dervish performed a religious ritual in Belgrade.

=== Austrian period ===
During the Austrian occupation of northern Serbia in 1717-39, Belgrade was divided by the governing Austrian authorities into six districts: Fortress, Serbian Town (modern Kosančićev Venac), German Town (modern Dorćol), Lower Serbian Town (Savamala), Karlstadt (Palilula), and the Great Military Hospital (Terazije-Tašmajdan).

German Town is today referred to as Baroque Belgrade. In this couple of decades, Austrians turned Belgrade from an Oriental town into a modern, European one, including several grandiose projects. German Town was divided into blocks and built according to the most modern rules of the Baroque architecture of the day. A series of houses with Baroque façades were built along the straight streets. Official buildings included hospitals, barracks, pharmacies, brewery, saltern, monasteries, schools and several official palaces. Also, it was the seat of the Prince Eugene of Savoy's court. For the first time, settlements outside of the fortress, German and Serbian towns, were fenced with the protective ramparts and gates which were connected by the four main city roads. As the Turks completely withdrew, Austrians settled people from all over the Habsburg Monarchy, including many merchants, traders, and artisans, but also war veterans and poor people. Chronicles record that the first theatrical shows were organized in this period, as they mention "comedies" being performed in some of the former mosques, which were abundant in Dorćol.

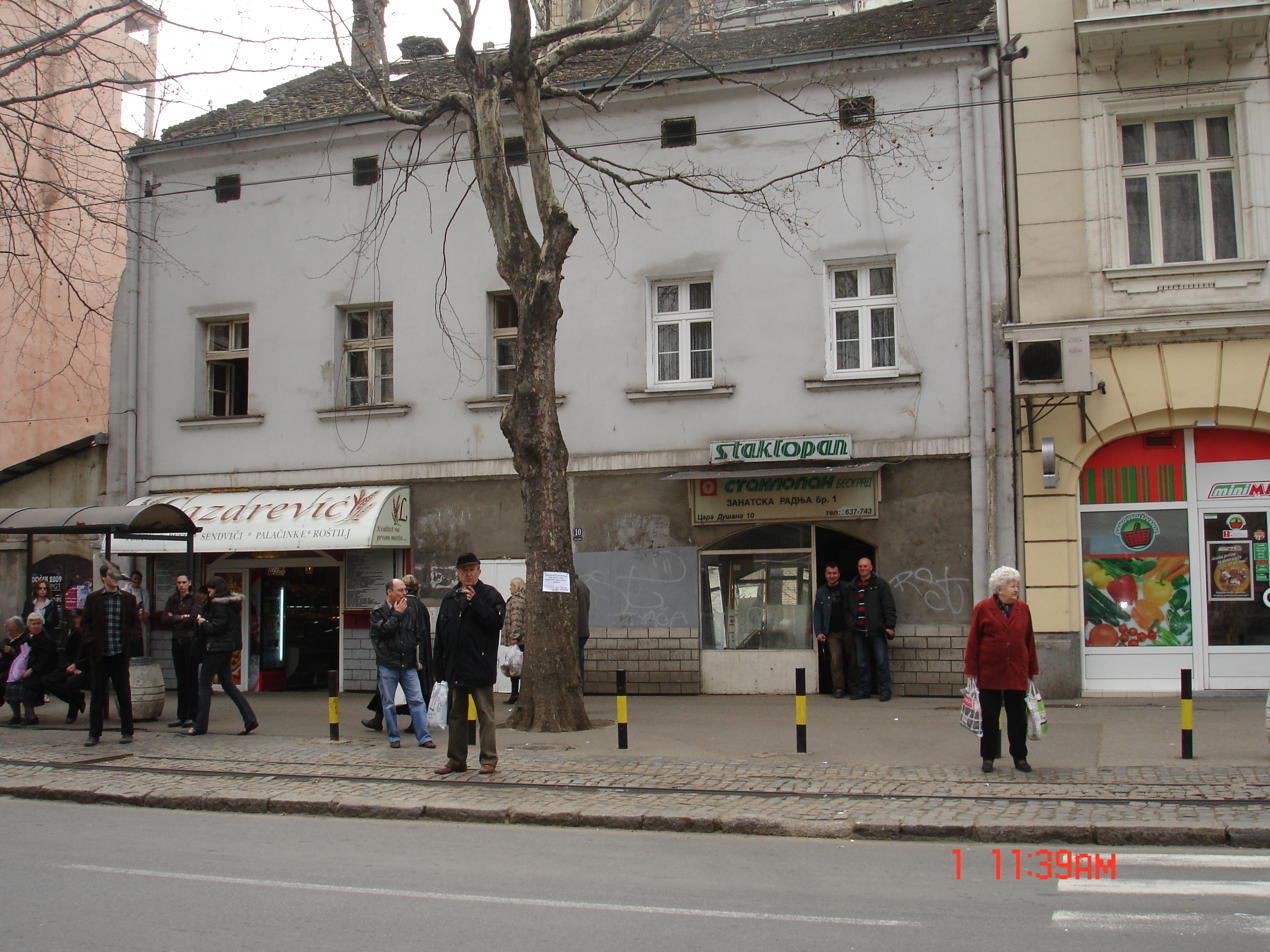
House at 10 Cara Dušana Street. Built in 1724–1727, it is the oldest surviving house in Belgrade

Several hospitals were established in German Town, including the Capucines' hospital. The Capucines were granted permission to do missionary work in Belgrade on 23 August 1718, on the Emperor's decision. They were given one of the mosques, which they adapted and dedicated to the Virgin Mary. On the city plans, their monastery is located just within the outer walls, next to the Emperor's Gate. They possibly arranged the Bajram-beg mosque, also known as the Stambol mosque, below the modern National Theatre in Belgrade, approximately on the location of the modern Church of St. Alexander Nevsky. The Capucines had only nine monks by 1725 which was quite insufficient for their duties. They were handling all the Catholics in the occupied area, proclaimed by the Austrian court as the Kingdom of Serbia. They also took religious care of the soldiers who were scattered over the region, but they only had two parochial priests. Still, they converted over 1,000 imperial soldiers from Protestantism to Catholicism. They originally took care of the ill all over Belgrade, in the fortress, existing hospitals, and private houses. In the letter of an unknown city clerk from 10 November 1736, sent to the Vicar Provincial of the order in Vienna, it was mentioned that the Capucines asked for the field hospital to be established. It would take care of the soldiers and have a place for 1,500 people. The military commander of Belgrade agreed, providing permanent pay and food for the monks who would treat the soldiers. There was enough space next to their monastery for such a facility. Still, the care of the soldiers was first offered to the Jesuits, but they refused. Names of two especially dedicated Capucine priests are preserved in the documents: Father Oswaldus and Father Chrysogonus.

However, the local population wasn't welcomed in German Town, though they welcomed Austrians as their Christian liberators. Division of Belgrade into German and Serbian towns was just the first step. German settlers asked the Austrian emperor on 8 April 1718 to allow only German Catholics to settle in German Town, to expel 40 Serbian families who already lived there, and to also expel or move into ghettos all Serbs, Armenians, Greeks, and Jews present there before the Austrians came. Germans openly stated that the local population, which lived there during the Ottoman period, moved into the largest and most beautiful Turkish houses, which Germans wanted for themselves. Emperor Charles VI granted almost the same rights to both towns, but on the pretext that they were fully separate. Statute of German Town stipulates that "Serbs, Armenians, and Greeks" will be tolerated only in separate municipalities. Non-German nationalities were finally completely expelled from German Town in 1726, when some estates were bought off, but the majority of people were relocated forcefully by the Austrian gendarmerie colonel Von Burg. By the end of their rule, there were massive differences between two parts of Belgrade, as the Austrians made no effort at all to cultivate Serbian Town, which remained an Oriental settlement, while German Town grew larger, both in area and population; new palaces, squares, and streets were built; and the fortress was reconstructed.

Belgrade remained rich in kafanas in this period. There were almost 200 kafanas and meyhanas, and production of alcoholic beverages in the city bloomed. Rakia was mainly produced by the local Jewish population, while beer was produced by both Jews and German migrant brewers. Brothers Jakov and Abraham Kepiš, grain merchants from Timișoara, built a large brewery close to Long Street, central in the neighborhood (modern Dušanova Street). It was situated on the location of the former Turkish cemetery, between modern Jevrejska, Braće Baruh, and Visokog Stevana streets. A massive, L-shaped building had one floor, an attic, and a basement under the entire yard. When the Ottomans retook Belgrade, they demolished or closed all breweries.

The Roman Catholic Church dedicated to Saint Peter the Apostle, at the corner of modern Dušanova and Cara Uroša Streets, began in 1732. After Austria lost the Austro-Turkish War of 1737–1739, northern Serbia, including Belgrade, was returned to the Turks. One of the provisions of the 1739 Treaty of Belgrade stated that Austria had to demolish all the fortifications and military and civilian buildings it had constructed during the occupation. Many Baroque buildings were demolished, including most of the hospitals. However, Austria didn't demolish the buildings outside the fortress walls. That way, the House at 10 Cara Dušana Street, built from 1724 to 1727, in the neighborhood of Dorćol also survived, being today the oldest house in Belgrade. Population also withdrew back to Austria, so the chronicles report that the Turks encountered only 8 Serbs and 45 Jews in the town. The Turks re-Orientalized Belgrade almost completely.

In Belgrade, the building of German Town was the first pre-designed construction according to urban plans envisioned for the city as a whole after almost 1,500 years and the Roman Singidunum. Almost nothing remained of this period in Dorćol, but the basic street grid and urban blocks mostly follow the patterns set at this time.

=== Later history ===
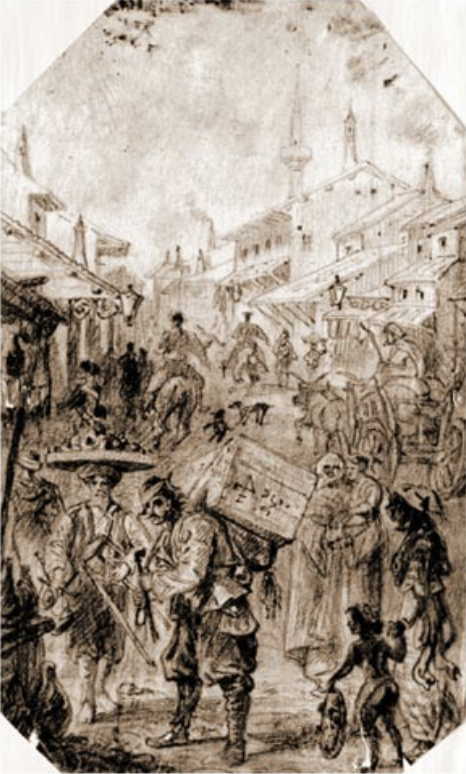
Main street of Dorćol, 1860

Bitpazar market (flea market) was located at the crossroad of the Bitpazarska and the street, which connected it to downtown Belgrade. After the 1862 Ottoman bombing of Belgrade, the flea shops from Bitpazar scattered all over the city, until 1887 when they were ordered by the city to group along the Fišegdžijska Street.

When Belgrade was divided into six quarters in 1860, Dorćol was one of them. By the census of 1883, it had a population of 5,728. Urban regulation of Dorćol began in the 1870s when the Association for the Improvement of the Danube Area was founded. They instigated cutting through the streets, their paving with cobblestone and embankment works on the Danube's bank. In this period the industrialization of Dorćol also began as numerous factories and workshops started to open. Among others, this included "Šonda", the first chocolate factory in Serbia.

One of the most popular city kafanas was Jasenica, located in Dorćol. It was a favorite place of mathematician and fisherman Mihailo Petrović, nicknamed Mika Alas. In front of this venue, Major Dragutin Gavrilović held his famous address to the soldiers who defended Belgrade against German and Austro-Hungarian attack in October 1915.

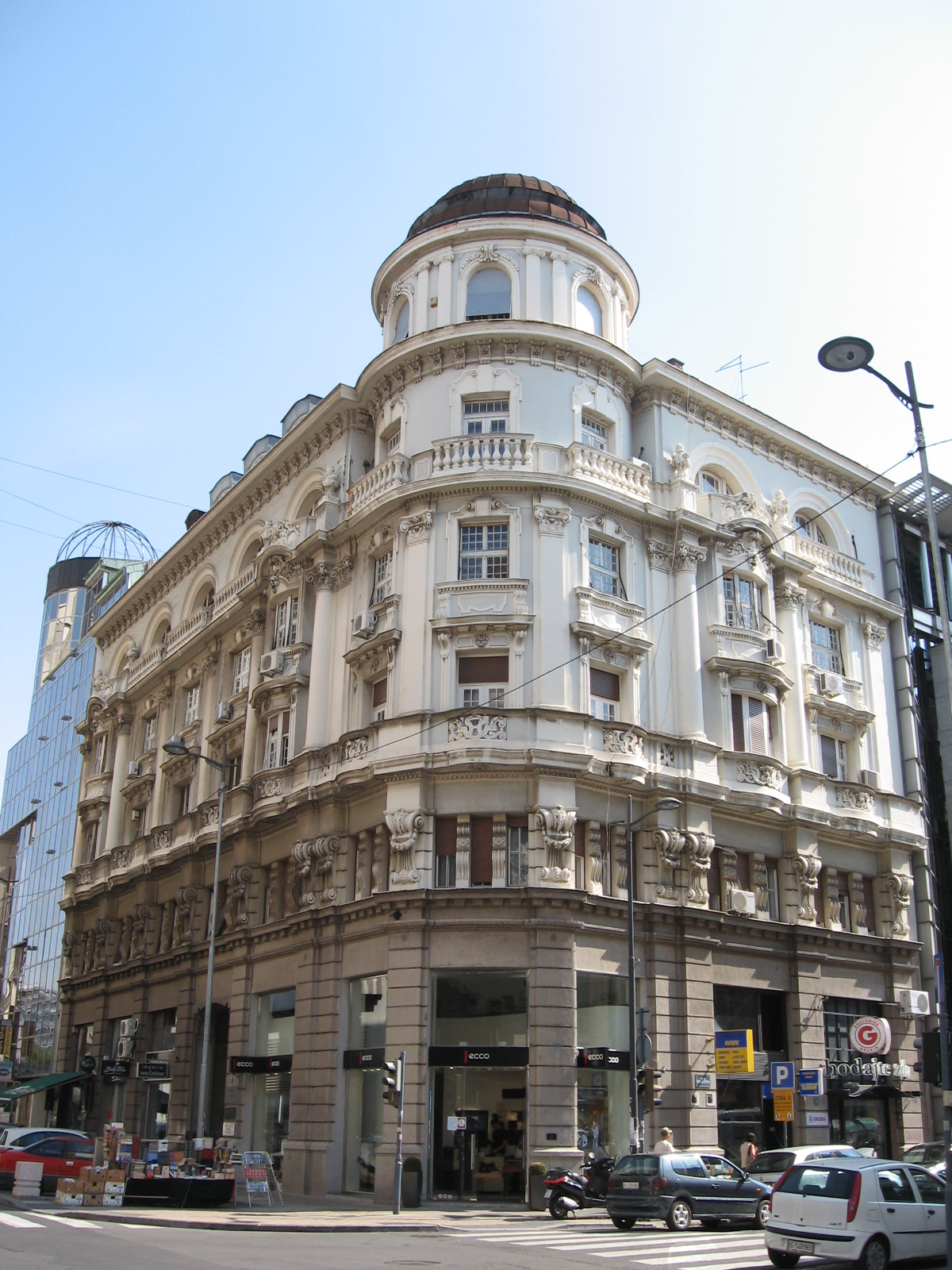
Palace of Serbian-Polish League, built in 1927

After the war, during the works to dig an underpass, 60 skeletons of the city defenders, both soldiers and gendarmes, were excavated. The remains were moved to the Memorial ossuary of the Belgrade defenders at the Belgrade New Cemetery, while their belongings, remarkably preserved, were sent to the Military Museum in the Belgrade Fortress, though they disappeared later. In Dorćol, a memorial plaque was posted in 1934 with the inscription "On this location, during the construction of the underpass, 60 skeletons of the defenders of Belgrade were excavated".

Until World War II, the lowest part of Dorćol was a location of the city's only official fish market (Riblja pijaca). As there were no refrigerators at the time, the fishermen sold the fish themselves, though some were first dried or smoked.

On 16 February 1919, one of the first kindergartens in Belgrade, and in Serbia in general, was opened in the Upper Dorćol, near the Čukur Fountain and close to the location of the demolished Stambol Gate. It was named Dunavsko obdanište (Danube's kindergarten), and as of 2020, it is still operation under that name, though it has moved to Lower Dorćol after Queen Maria, later during the Interbellum, donated a building for the kindergarten at 1 Cara Dušana Street. Today it is the oldest kindergarten in the territory of the Stari Grad municipality.

In 1920, the Society for the Construction of the Catholic Church in Belgrade was founded. In the next years, the Society and the city administration couldn't find common ground on the location of the future Belgrade Cathedral. The locations asked for by the Society and those offered by the city included Krunski Venac, Savamala, Mostar, and Palilula, until the city proposed the lot in Dorćol in 1931, bounded by the streets Visokog Stevana, Despota Đurđa, Cara Uroša, and Princa Eugenija (today Braće Baruh).

In 1930, the Society announced an international design competition, which resulted in 129 designs (79 from Germany, 18 from Austria, 15 from Yugoslavia, and the rest from Switzerland, Italy, Czechoslovakia, Bulgaria, and Hungary). The project of German architect Josef Wenzler was chosen. He planned a monumental, three-naves basilica, 65 m (213 ft) long and 36 m (118 ft) wide. Total floor area was to cover 58,938 m^{2} (634,400 sq ft) and host 4,300 people (3,390 sitting, 910 standing). It was to be dedicated to the Saint John of Capistrano who participated in the defense of Belgrade during the 1456 Ottoman siege. The Society disliked the location in Dorćol but planned to build the cathedral anyway. After the ensuing money problems, it was disbanded and, ultimately, the central church for Roman Catholics in Belgrade was never built. After World War II, the lot was nationalized by the state and the elementary school "Braća Baruh" was built on it.

In the 1930s, railway was conducted from the Belgrade Main Railway Station, circling around the Belgrade Fortress, through Dorćol into Viline Vode industrial zone, and in 1935 further across the Bridge of King Peter II.

"Oneg Shabbat and Gemilut hasadim" center was built in 1923, at 16 Jevrejska Street. It became the most important gathering place for Dorćol's Jews. After World War II, it was renamed the Braća Baruh Center for culture, while today it is known as the cinema "Reks". Construction of the First Belgrade Gymnasium, next to the Church of Alexander Nevsky, was finished in 1938. Dorćol was partially demolished during the heavy Easter bombing of Belgrade by the Allies on 16 April 1944. Eventually, the old low houses and narrow streets were changed into modern buildings. Still, some parts, though vanishing one by one, resemble the old look.

In the 1950s and 1960s, Dorćol began to change, from a mixed, old-style neighborhood into the more modern one. Old synagogue in Mojsije's alley was demolished in 1954. Building next to it, at 14 Jevrejska Street, was one of the oldest in Belgrade, but it was also demolished in the late 1950s. After the 2010s, many parts were declared cheep "city building land", which resulted in accelerated demolition of the old houses, and construction of new, taller buildings. By the 2020s, "almost nothing" remained of "old Dorćol".

In October 2022, removal of the 90 years old railway tracks in Dorćol started, as a result of shutting down the Main Station, and construction of the Belgrade's linear park. The tracks will be removed completely, as they have been disconnected already for several years, since the beginning of the construction of Belgrade Waterfront, on the other side of the city.

Large section in the eastern part of the neighborhood, behind the Belgrade Port, was announced for demolition in September 2023. The old, mostly storage structures, including the vast Kompresor industrial complex, will be replaced by the SelfNest company with six massive buildings on 1.3 ha (3.2 acres) and almost 500 apartments between the former railway tracks, Dunavska, Kneginje Ljubice and Dobračina streets. The urban blocks were designed by Milena Stevanović Šaljić and Vladan Nikolić. Transformation was planned for the further 18.7 ha (46 acres) in the wider area of this complex, along the area formerly occupied by the railway tracks. Plans include demolition of the existing, mainly derelict industrial and storage buildings, and construction of commercial zones and urban centers. Up to ten stories high buildings will stretch along the almost entire Dorćol area in the west-east direction, from the Francuska to the Mike Alasa street.

== Historical neighborhoods ==
=== Zerek (Upper Dorćol) ===
Zerek roughly encompassed the modern area bounded by the streets of Francuska, Vasina, Tadeuška Košćuška, and Cara Dušana. It was the original location of the neighborhood, where it developed during the Ottoman period and from where Dorćol spread as it grew. Its name originates from the Turkish language (zeyrek) and means scenic viewpoint, as Zerek developed on the slopes above the Danube. Other theories of the origin of the neighborhood's name, that it comes from the Turkish word meaning "wise (man)", or from Zeyrek, neighborhood of Istanbul, are considered less likely.

In the 16th and 17th centuries, Zerek was a prosperous trading center, with numerous foreign trade colonies, including ones from the Republic of Ragusa. The neighborhood was originally centered around the modern Kralja Petra Street, which was previously named the Zerek Street. As in the 16th century city outside of the fortress was located only where the modern Kosančićev Venac neighborhood is, south of Zerek, Zerek was called the "first suburb of Belgrade" and is considered to be one of the oldest neighborhoods in the city. Even the Bajrakli mosque was once called Zerek mosque. Zerek Street, as the central in the neighborhood, was full of foreign trade representations, and as Serbian name for Ragusa is Dubrovnik, part of the street is still called Dubrovačka today. They used to build Mediterranean-style houses with one floor. Ground floor was a shop while the upper floor hosted the living quarters. Two of those old Ragusan houses survived at the corner of the Kralja Petra and Uzun Mirkova until the early 1900s.

During the Austrian occupation, 1717–1739, they tried to modernize Zerek, building a settlement in the western style, and even settling 333 families of German immigrants, transforming Dorćol into the "German town" (Nemačka varoš). At this time, all the most important administrative buildings in Belgrade were located in the neighborhood. The top of the neighborhood, along the modern Knez Mihailova Street, was occupied by the rows of gardens.

There were numerous kafanas in the neighborhood. At one point, there were 25 of them. Zerek was a grid of intertwined, curved streets (sokak). The houses in general were small, usually having small gate and just one window. There were numerous Turkish houses, almost all of which had textile shops and large gardens. By the mid-19th century, it was the busiest part of Belgrade and the best known and most popular shops of all kinds were located in the neighborhood, owned by some of the most distinguished families in the state at the time: Nasko, Kujundžić, Bodi, Kumanudi, etc. Famous pastry shop Pelivan was founded in 1851 in the neighborhood. As of 2020, it is the oldest, still operational pastry shop in Belgrade, although on another location. Šonda chocolate factory was also in the neighborhood, while in the lowest section, along the Cara Dušana Street the fish and meat were sold.

Another characteristic of Zerek was its ethnic and religious diversity, unlike the Main Bazaar (Kosančićev Venac) which was almost exclusively Christian neighborhood. It was inhabited by the mix of Serbs, Cincars, Turks, Jews, Armenians, Bosnian Muslims, etc. There was also a Jewish quarter. Zerek used to be mostly inhabited by the Turks, but after they left Belgrade, Serbs and Cincars began to buy out their lots and properties. After World War I, Zerek ceased being a popular commercial part of the town.

=== Jalija (Lower Dorćol) ===
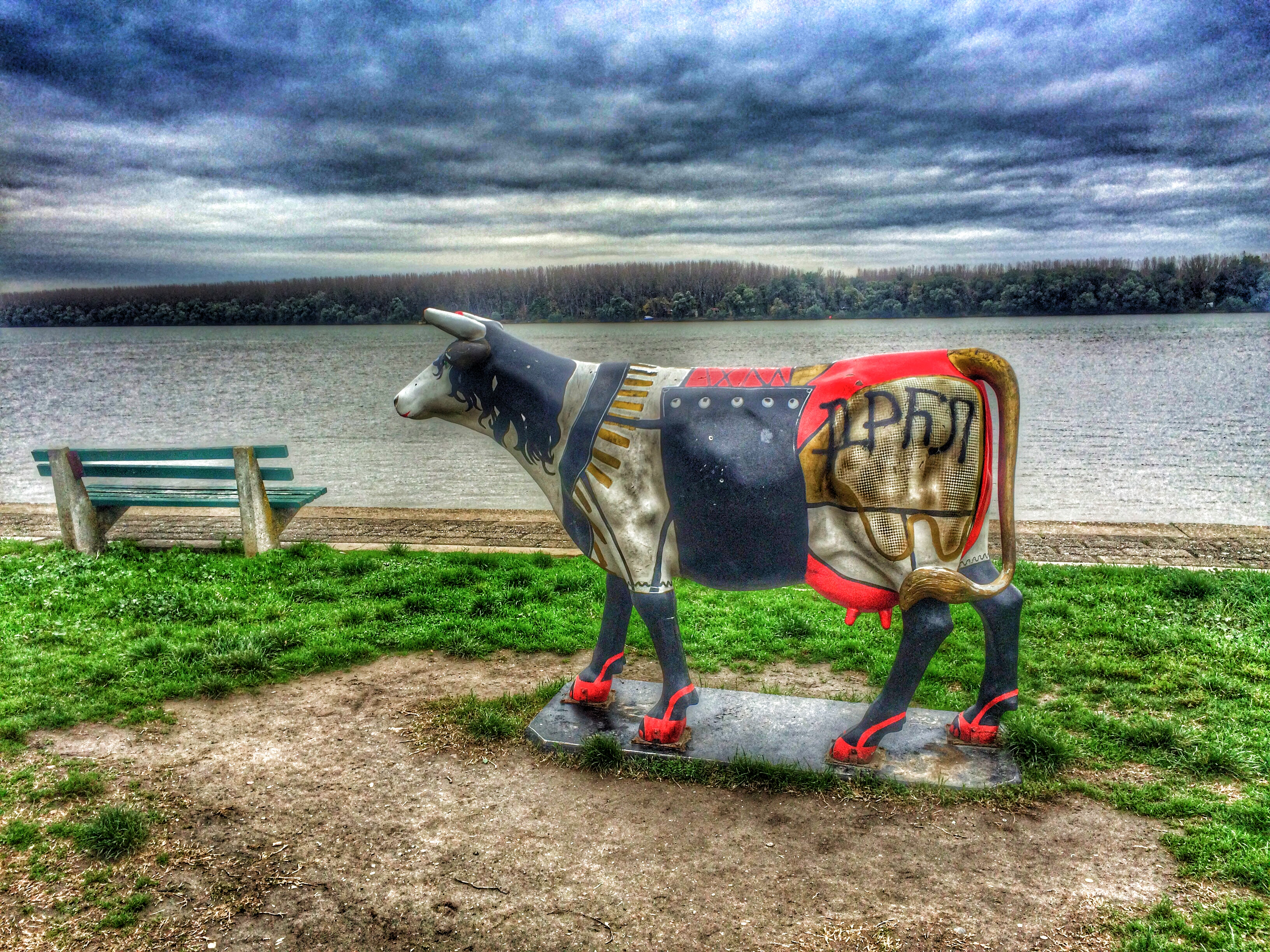
Part of the former Jalija, a modern promenade on the Danube Quay embankment

The Lower Dorćol used to be known as Jalija (Turkish yali, strand, bank). During the Austrian occupation of 1717–39, Jalija was the seat of the Prince Eugene of Savoy's court. Before the area was fully urbanized, Jalija was regularly flooded by the Danube.

Jalija occupied the area between the Danube on the north, Cara Dušana Street on the south, Kalemgdan park on the west and the Old Power Plant (modern marina) on the east. At the time, the bank of the Danube was a sandy beach, separated from the urbanized part of Jalija by the meadows. The neighborhood mostly consisted of the small, irregularly oriented and asymmetrical houses with yards filled with the beds of roses and hyacinths. The streets, paved with the kaldrma-type cobblestone, were narrow, mostly dead ends, so the passages through the yards were used for passing by.

Large section of the neighborhood was inhabited by Jews, so it was also known as the Jewish mala. They began settling in Jalija at least in the 16th century. The neighborhood was dotted with small grocery and craft shops. On Jewish holidays the fairs were organized, especially on Purim, when masked Jews were greeting Belgraders in the streets, giving away treats. After the intermittent occupations of Belgrade by the Austrians in the 18th century, number of Jews in Jalija grew, so the Sephardic, and later the Ashkenazi municipalities were founded. The neighborhood was described as the "part of Belgrade where you could breathe the most freely", and it never developed into the ghetto. By the 18thy century, Jewish settlement became a proper quarter, which included synagogue, school and hamam.

Many Serbian-Jewish authors and artists lived in Jalija, including Hajim Davičo, Leon Koen, Moša Pijade and Bora Baruh. The majority of Jalija's Jewish population was annihilated in World War II. Reminders of the previous inhabitants include the modern Jevrejska ("Jewish") Street and a memorial dedicated to the Jews perished in Holocaust. Sculptured by Nandor Glid, the sculpture named "Menorah in Flames" is erected on a quay along the Danube in the sub-neighborhood of 25 May. The monument was dedicated in 1990.

The neighborhood is also described in literary works of writers such as Stevan Sremac, Branislav Nušić, Milutin Uskoković and David Alkalaj.

== Economy ==
Western and northern sections of Dorćol are mainly residential, but eastern and riverside regions are heavily industrialized: depots and workshops of "GSP" (Belgrade City's transportation company), Belgrade City's Waterworks and Sewage company, heat plant "Dunav", Belgrade power station,"Žitomlin", "Jugošped", "Kopaonik", "Kompresor", numerous depots and hangars, etc. On the opposite, clothing company "Beko" is located in the westernmost section of Dorćol.

The area is known for its promenade on the Danube bank, which is well developed with a long bicycle path for recreation and many night clubs on water. The promenade is called Obala majora Gavrilovića ("the riverbank of major Gavrilović") after Dragutin Gavrilović, a Serbian officer who took part in defense of Belgrade in World War I from the Austrian army on this place.

Former grain silos in the western end of the Belgrade Port have been adapted into the "(Re-)Creational Center Belgrade Silos". The melliferous garden has been planted around the silos, containing over 700 melliferous plants, and in 2021 the honey production began. The honey park will be included in the future linear park, planned along the entire bank of Dorćol.

=== Hospitality ===
Dorćol is well known for its hospitality and catering facilities. Upper section is full of cafés, bars and restaurants, mostly concentrated in the streets of Strahinjića Bana, Kneginje Ljubice and Kralja Petra. In the lower section of the neighborhood there are numerous small cafés, craft breweries and artistic centers.

=== Transportation ===
Traffic facilities include the railway which circles around the fortress of Kalemegdan, from the main railway station of Belgrade, through Dorćol, and over the Pančevo Bridge further into Vojvodina. Small marina is projected to be in the future one of the most modern and expensive parts of the neighborhood.

Dorćol hosts the central depot for city trolleybuses, in the Dunavska Street. After the new city government took over in 2013, an idea of abolishing the trolleybus network was raised, due to the possible creation of the pedestrian zone in the entire central section of Belgrade. Propositions include the change of the routes in downtown, the relocation of the central terminus from Studentski Trg to Slavija Square and of the depo from Dorćol to Medaković. After public protests, the idea was modified in 2015 and the city announced that the terminus from Studentski Trg will be relocated to the Dunavska Street, extending the trolleybus lines to Dorćol, as a temporary solution. In August 2019, city confirmed its plans to relocate the depot to Medaković, along the Belgrade-Niš motorway. The plan envisions a major garage area, next to the already existing depot "Kosmaj 1". New planned additions are "Kosmaj 2", that is, the relocated trolleybuses depot and "Mala Autokomanda", for the city public transportation company's technical and auxiliary vehicles.

The western part of the Port of Belgrade "Dunav" also belongs to Dorćol. City's general urban plan (GUP) from 1972 projected the removal of the Port of Belgrade and the industrial facilities by 2021. The cleared area was to encompass the Danube's bank from the Dorćol to the Pančevo bridge. At that time, the proposed new locations included the Veliko Selo marsh or the Reva 2 section of Krnjača, across the Danube. When the GUP was revised in 2003, it kept the idea od relocating the port and the industry, and as the new location only Krnjača was mentioned. There was an idea that the already existing port of Pančevo, after certain changes, could become the new Belgrade's port, but the idea was abandoned. After General Secretary of the Chinese Communist Party Xi Jinping visited Serbia in 2016, it was announced that the large, new port of Belgrade will be built in the central part of Beljarica, a wetland upstream the Danube, known as "Belgrade's Amazonia". The proposed area of the future port is almost half of the wetland and should cover 8.72 km^{2} (3.37 sq mi) in its central part. As of 2020, no works began.

In December 2021, city announced restoration of the riverine public transportation, which was discontinued decades ago. One of the first two proposed lines should be New Belgrade's Block 45-Sports Center Milan Gale Muškatirović, at Dorćol. Even the second line, planned to eventually connect Borča and Ada Huja, will in the first, testing phase connect Dorćol and Zemunski Kej. But the New mayor Aleksandar Šapić stated in July 2022 that the project will not be pursued further, calling it too expensive and "pointless".

==== Marina Dorćol ====
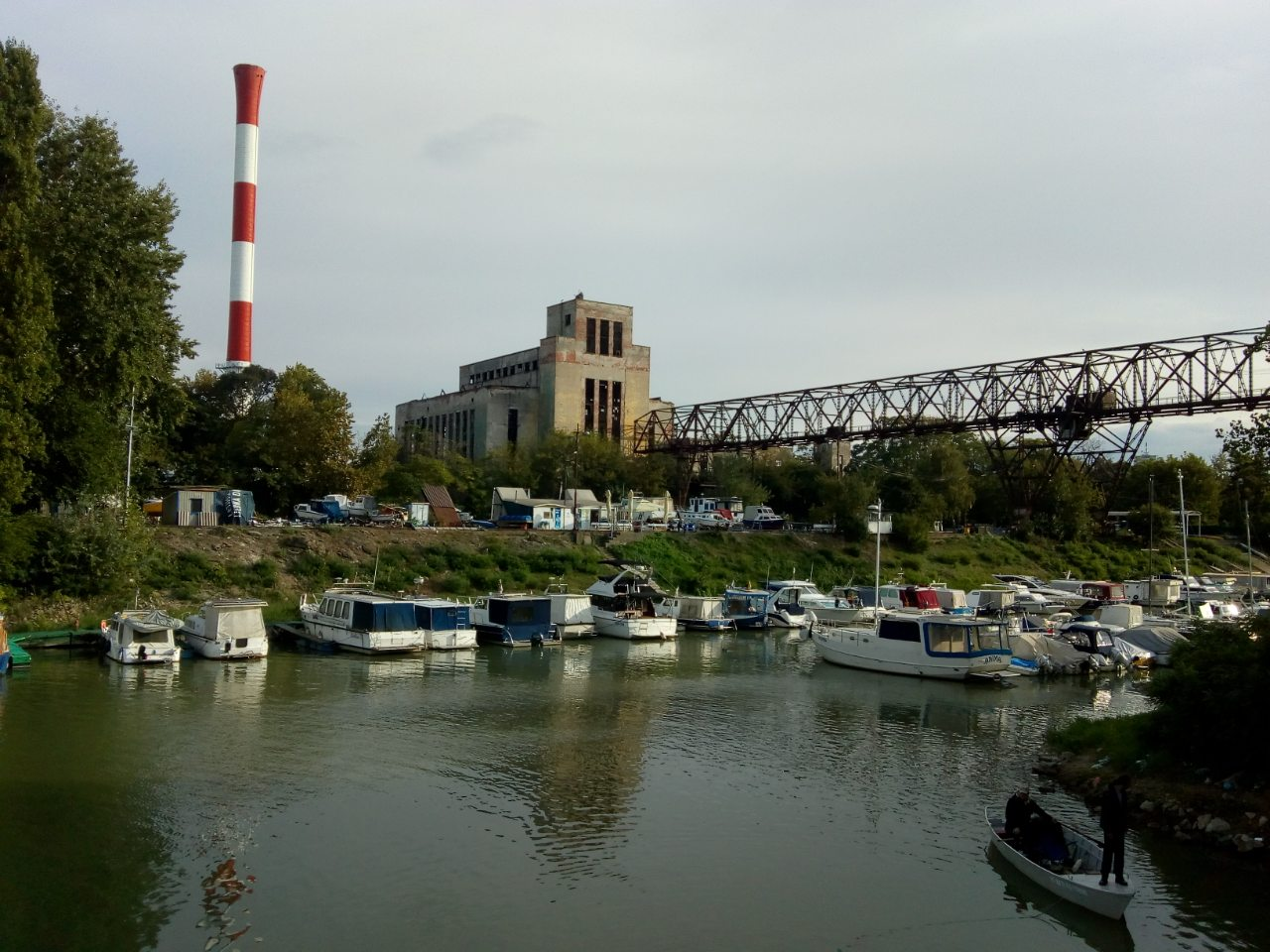
Marina Dorćol, with Old Power Plant

Land in the Marina Dorćol was among the costliest pieces of land in Belgrade when it was leased to the Israeli investor "Engel Marina Dorćol" in 2006, which hired architect Rami Wimmer for the project. The land covers an area of 4.5 ha (11 acres) and it is allowed to build a total floor area of 76,000 m^{2} (820,000 sq ft). As per the detailed regulatory plan from 2005, the project of the new residential and commercial complex in marina, with high-rise buildings, shops, sports fields, public promenade with avenues, etc., was loudly advertised. The investor was litigating with the city for years due to the numerous things, which included the fee of the lease and city taxes. It is not clear whether the contract was mutually terminated in 2016; by October 2017 nothing has been done on the lot, the lease contract was annulled and city decided to sell it. The area, with the neighboring lots, was now planned as the cultural, scientific and research complex, which would include the new building of the Nikola Tesla Museum. In 2017, someone illegally built an object on the lot while by April 2018 several construction barracks have been placed, too, and part of the land is turned into the illegal parking.

In September 2019, Czech-based company "MD Investments 2000" purchased the marina and the surrounding 4.07 ha (10.1 acres) of land. They were the only bidders and the total price was 3,86 billion dinars (€32.7 million). The investor had to follow the 2005 plan, including the partial reconstruction of the old power plant, which should be ultimately adapted into the Tesla museum, and construction of the berth, both of which will be then returned to the city. In February 2020 it was confirmed that the museum will be relocated to the building of the Belgrade Main railway station instead to the Old Power Plant. Just a few days later, the government stated that they actually didn't decide where the museum will be relocated and that it may be some completely different location. City then announced the power plant may become "a public object for the cultural activities...from creative industries", which should be finished in 2023. In December 2020 government confirmed that the Nikola Tesla Museum will be relocated into the building.

In 2019 city announced creation of the linear park along the Sava and the Danube, from Savamala's Branko's Bridge to Pančevo Bridge, patterned after the High Line park in New York City and Zaryadye Park in Moscow. This includes the Dorćol's quay from the sports center, through marina, to the port. The park will stretch for 4.7 km (2.9 mi) and cover an area of 47 ha (120 acres). City planned to hire the Diller Scofidio + Renfro design studio but later announced that 10 different Serbian teams, each for one of 10 planned segments of the park, will be hired. Finances apparently were the problem, as the city refused to disclose how much the New York studio asked for, while the World Bank backed from financing the project, with city claiming the credit wasn't favorable anyway. Beginning of the construction was tentatively moved to 2021. Ten teams were publicly presented in February 2020 and the deadline for the completion of works is set for 2023. Chief city urbanist Marko Stojčić several times publicly said that the companies which are located along the route should donate money for the park. Marina's investors announced that through one of their connected companies, they will finance the drafting of the conceptual design of all 10 teams (55 architects in total). Stojčić said they didn't do this out of their kindness, but because they can't start any works until the detailed regulatory plan for the park is finished.

In April 2020, the investors announced the construction of the €150 million worth project in 2021. They stated that the 2005 detailed regulatory plan "does not fit into their ideas", so they will work with the city to change it in their favor. They also claimed that there will be no skyscrapers and overcrowding and that the total floor area will be smaller than officially allowed, but couldn't specify how much that will be. The area under the crane will be adapted into the public, green square. Czech architect Stanislav Fiala was hired to design the project. In May 2021, a computer imaging of the future "green" Marina was made public.

== Features ==
=== Buildings ===
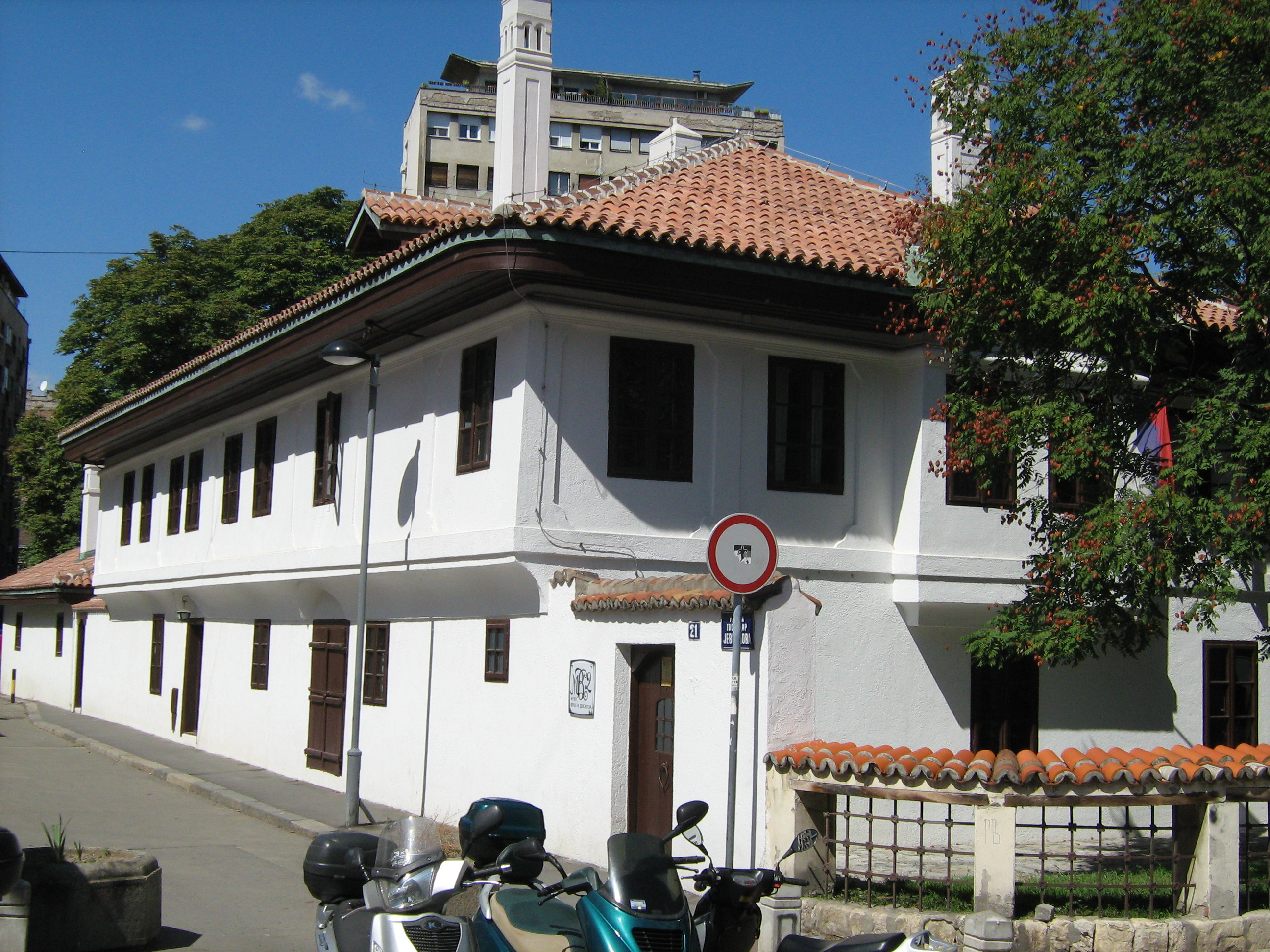
Museum of Vuk and Dositej

Being one of the original settlements outside the Kalemegdan fortress, Dorćol is a location of some of the oldest city buildings.

Bajrakli Mosque

Belgrade's only mosque, Bajrakli Mosque, is located in the southernmost part of the neighborhood, in the Gospodar Jevremova street. Originally built from 1660 to 1688 as Çohaci mosque, it was turned into a Roman Catholic church during the Austrian rule in central Serbia in 1717–1739, then a mosque again. Renamed Bajrakli mosque (Turkish: bayrak, flag) in the 18th century, it has been demolished and rebuilt several times.

House at 10 Cara Dušana Street

The oldest surviving private house in downtown Belgrade that is still used as a residence is located in the House at 10 Cara Dušana Street. It was built in 1724–27. The house has an arched ceiling and is currently used as a bakery. In the same street, another cultural monument, the Steam Bath of Brothers Krsmanović, is located.

Church of Alexander Nevsky

During the Serbian-Ottoman war in 1876, a corps of Russian volunteers headed by Mikhail Chernyayev arrived in Belgrade, where they continued to conscript volunteers. For their purposes, a mobile military church also came from Russia and followed them to the battlefields. The mobile church was dedicated to the Holly Prince Alexander Nevsky. It was located at the Great Market, at the top of Dorćol, and used for eucharists and requiem masses. When it was moved in 1876, residents of Dorćol formed a board for the construction of the church and a small, stone church was built a bit below modern one, dedicated to Alexander Nevsky, too.

The church was demolished in 1891 due to the urban expansion of Dorćol. The foundation stone for the new church was laid down by the Serbian heir apparent Aleksandar Karađorđević in 1912 but the Balkan Wars and World War I prevented to completion of the church until 1930 with the Royal family of Karađorđević being the largest donors. Designed by Jelisaveta Načić, the church is built in the medieval Serbian Moravian style. Ornamented with interlaces and rose windows, it has an aethereal appearance as opposed to its sturdy medieval paragons.

Memorial bust to Alexander Nevsky was dedicated in the churchyard on 18 November 2021.

Building of the Red Cross of Serbia

Foundations were laid on 28 June 1879. It was designed specifically to serve as the headquarters of the Red Cross of Serbia by Aleksandar Bugarski, on the vast lot donated by the Princess consort Natalie of Serbia bounded by the streets Simina, Kneginje Ljubice and Dobračina. The building served not only for the administrative purposes (Red Cross offices), but also as a hospital, medical supplies storage, war shelter, and a gathering point for supplies distribution. Because of this, though a ground floor building, it was spacious, with large inner yard. The façade was reduced and simple, with fanlights above the windows. The only specific ornament was decorative attic on the front façade, forming an emblem of the Red Cross. After World War I, two floors, mansard roof, and additional wing in the yard were added to the building. During the 1941 German bombing majority of it was demolished by the five bombs which hit the building, but it was reconstructed after the war. It served as a shelter again during the 1999 NATO bombing of Serbia. The building was declared a cultural monument in 1987.

First Power Plant

The first public thermal power plant in Serbia was Doćol thermal power plant. It became operational on 6 October 1893 and originally supplied city streets (65 lamps and 422 light bulbs), homes of the affluent families, trams and, still rare, industrial complexes. It was constructed by physicist Đorđe Stanojević, a friend of Nikola Tesla, and avid advocate of replacement of the gas lights with the electric ones. The power plant was closed on 14 May 1933, after the new, "Power and Light" power plant was also opened in the neighborhood. Since 2005, building of the former power plant at 51 Skender-begova Street hosts the Belgrade Museum of Science and Machinery. Within the museum, the "Molekul" scientific center for the elementary and secondary school students has been open since September 2021.

House of bookseller Marko Marković

The "House of bookseller Marko Marković" at 45-a Gospodar Jovanova street, has been declared a cultural monument in April 2013. It was projected by the first Serbian women architect, Jelisaveta Načić. Though there are her public works throughout the city, this is the only surviving family house she planned. The house was built in 1904 and the exterior remained unchanged. Still residential house today, it has been described as the "authentic urban expression of an era".

Beth Israel Synagogue

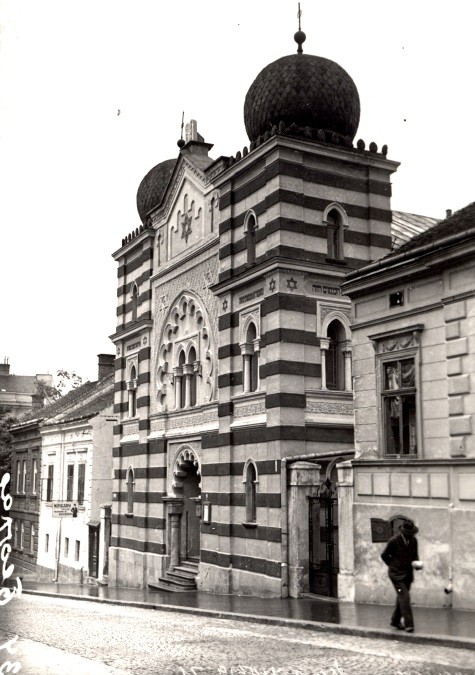
Beth Israel Synagogue, demolished in 1944

Sephardi Jews decided to build a new synagogue on their lot in the Kralja Petra Street. Architect Milan Kapetanović designed the building in 1901, with the 30 m (98 ft) wide main façade. As they weren't able to obtain permits, the Jewish Municipality decided to build it on the lot's section in 20 Cara Uroša Street. Kapetanović redesigned it, reducing it to the width of 14 m (46 ft). In 1907, King Peter I Karađorđević laid the foundation stone for the Beth Israel Synagogue. It was finished next year and on 7 September 1908 the king was present at the consecration, symbolically declaring it opened.

Built in the Moorish style, for several decades it was one of the most recognizable objects in Belgrade because of the façade with the horizontal stripes made of stones and bricks in different colors, so as for the terracotta ornaments on the façade. It was damaged and looted during the World War II and the retreating German occupational army burned it in 1944, causing major damage so it had to be demolished after the war. In the building on this location, constructed later, Gallery of the Frescoes is located today. The gallery was opened in 1952.

Old Power Plant

After World War I, city administration started extensive public works on repairing and expanding urban infrastructure: paving of the streets with cobblestone, construction of the sewage and waterworks system, public buildings, etc. As the city had no money, the administration took loans. It included the 1927 loan from the New York City bankers, in an amount of $3 million. City was to return the money in 1929, but there wasn't enough money in the city budget. A bidding for the concession for the construction of a power plant was set in early 1929. The winner was to pay off Belgrade's debt to the bankers, land a new loan to the city and build and operate the power plant. City councilors were against the arrangement and mayor Miloš Savčić had a hard time to convince them to vote for the deal. The bidding was won by the investors group from Basel, in Switzerland, headed by the Swiss Society for Electrification and Transportation.

From 1930 to 1932, the "Power and Light" thermal power station was built in the Dunavski kej street, on the bank of the modern marina. It was designed in the Bauhaus manner. For the first time in Serbia, the low voltage distribution grid for the alternating power supply was built. The complex consists of the station building, portal crane with the hoist, pump station and the filtering machine. It was in use until the early 1960s and in 1970s was used as set for the cult TV serial Otpisani. It was declared a cultural monument in April 2013. Abandoned, it became the major nesting location of ravens in Belgrade. As of 2020, the construction still stands, but it is in total ruin.

In June 2018 city government announced the selling of marina and use of that money for funding the works on the plant. It should be transformed into the scientific and research center and the new location of the Nikola Tesla Museum. In 2017 it was announced that it will cover 30,000 m^{2} (320,000 sq ft) but in 2018 it was reduced to 10,000 m^{2} (110,000 sq ft). The complex should also include a library, science campus and promotional center for informational technologies and genetic engineering. Works should start by the end of 2019. In January 2019 city announced the drafting of the plan for the future museum. In February 2020, however, it was announced that the museum will be relocated to the building of the former Belgrade Main railway station in Savamala. Just few days later, the government stated that they actually don't know where the museum will be relocated and that it may be some third, completely different location. After president Aleksandar Vučić said in September 2020 that the former railway station will be turned into the Museum of Medieval Serbia, in October city officially asked the government to move the Nikola Tesla Museum into the former power station.

Aero-Club

Monumental, multi-functional building in the Art Deco style at the corner of Kralja Petra and Uzun Mirkova streets. It was projected in 1932 by Vojin Simeonović, and opened on 20 January 1935. The building has a lavish spiral staircase in the entry hall, which has been used in numerous movies and TV series. The hall has white steps, checkered floor and a two-stories high stained glass window Daedalus and Icarus, work of Vasa Pomorišac. The building hosts a gallery-legacy of Petar Dobrović. The "Aero-Club" was declared a cultural monument in 2007.

Jewish Hospital

Belgrade's Jewish community constructed a building at 2 Visokog Stevana Street in 1938. It was operated by the female members of the community and included a kindergarten, medical dispensary for children and the school of crafts for girls from the destitute families. After German occupation of Belgrade in April 1941, the Jews were banned from either working in hospitals or being treated as a patients, so the female home in Dorćol was transformed into the Jewish Hospital. They treated Jews from Belgrade, those banished from the Banat region and the severely ill from the Sajmište concentration camp. In March 1942, Germans drove a gas van (dušegupka) to Belgrade. In an operation, headed by two lower SS officers Götz and Meyer, which lasted from 18 to 22 March 1942, the entire hospital staff and over 800 patients were killed in the van. They were transported from the hospital to the execution ground in Jajinci, across the town, but as only 10 to 15 minutes was enough for the exhaust fumes to suffocate everyone tightly packed in the van, they all died during transport. Götz and Meyer organized Serbian prisoners in Jajinci to take the bodies out and bury them in mass graves. The people from the hospital were the first victims of the van in Belgrade, which was later used in the same manner for falsely transporting remaining Jews from all over Belgrade to the Sajmište camp. In 2003 David Albahari wrote a novel Götz and Meyer, depicting what happened. The building is today seat of the Faculty for Special Education and Rehabilitation. On 22 March 2018 a memorial plaque was placed on the building, commemorating the 1942 event.

Strahinjića Bana – "Silicone Valley"

Since the late 1990s, Strahinjića Bana street became a "café-street", with dozens of bars, restaurants and cafés. Since then, it became favorite entertainment place of the emerging classes of Belgrade's nouveau riche and gold diggers, and the street has been sarcastically nicknamed "Silicone Valley" because it is frequented by many trophy women (allegedly sporting surgical implants) and their wealthy businessmen. It may be considered as the modern successor of the old Zerek Street which was full of kafanas at its heyday.

=== Sub-neighborhoods ===
25 May

In the late 1970s construction of the buildings surrounding the 25th May Sports Center and the exclusive, now closed restaurant "Dunavski Cvet" began. In the 1980s the settlement was considered elite, but deteriorated later.

Next to the sports center, along the river in the direction of the fortress, is the memorial dedicated to the soldiers who defended Belgrade from Austro-Hungarians in 1915. Work of sculptor Nikola Milunović, it was dedicated in 1988, and contains the words of major Dragutin Gavrilović: Soldiers, exactly at three o'clock, the enemy is to be crushed by your fierce charge, destroyed by your grenades and bayonets. The honor of Belgrade, our capital, must not be stained. Soldiers! Heroes! The supreme command has erased our regiment from its records. Our regiment has been sacrificed for the honor of Belgrade and the Fatherland. Therefore, you no longer need to worry about your lives: they no longer exist. So, forward to glory! For the King and the Fatherland! Long live the King, Long live Belgrade!. In September 2023 city announced it will arrange the entire surrounding area as a memorial park, as it was originally envisioned by Milunović. The park will be included in the future Belgrade's linear park.

K Distrikt

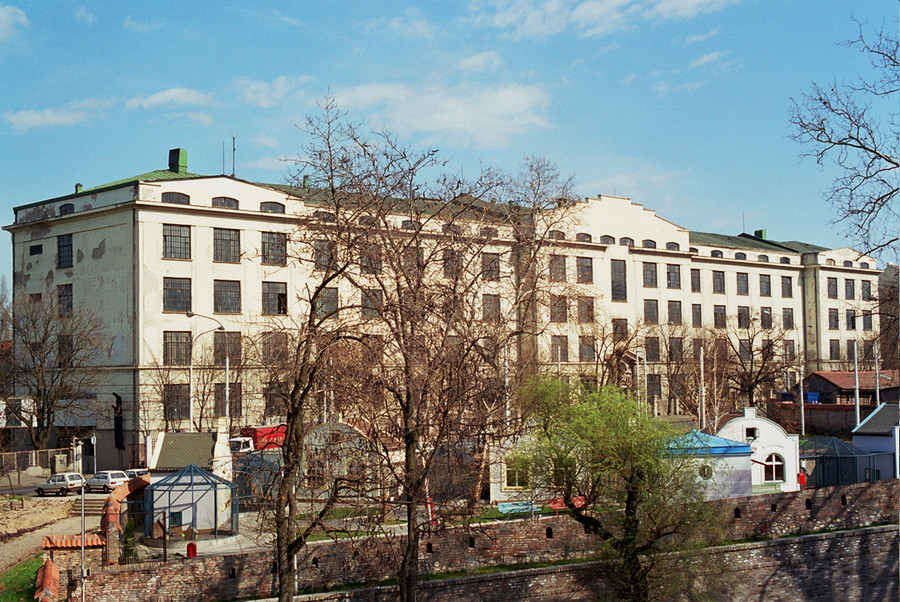
Beko Factory in 2018, prior to reconstruction

In 2007, Greek real estate developer "Lamda Development" obtained the land in the neighborhood for €55 million. It was announced that the westernmost section of lower Dorćol, just below the zoo and centered around the former "Beko" factory, will be transformed into the new residential and commercial complex. The design for the "Beko" project as it became known, was work of Zaha Hadid's architectural bureau. It divided the public and local architects. Some thought it was a good solution for the location while others found the complex too bulky and instead of opening the fortress to the river, it was walling it up. The permit was granted by the State Institute for the Protection of the Cultural Monuments in 2012, but in 10 years "Lamda" didn't even demolish everything, let alone built something. In 2017 they sold the land to the investor Vladimir Gogoljev for €25 million.

In February 2018 it was announced that the "Beko" project was officially replaced with the "K Distrikt" project. In the triangularly shaped area, bounded by the streets of Dunavska, Bulevar vojvode Bojovića and Tadeuša Košćuškog, buildings with the total floor area of 115.000 m^{2} (1,237.85 sq ft) will be built. The project is work of architect Boris Podrecca and the construction should commence in the fall of 2018. The "Beko" factory building itself has to be preserved as it is protected by the law as the cultural monument, but it is not known at the moment whether it will be a commercial building or a hotel.

When announced, the project was the second largest in Belgrade after the Belgrade Waterfront. It was also presented as the Dutch investments, because of the involvement of the entrepreneurs Menno de Jong and Prince Bernhard of Orange-Nassau. By November 2018 no construction began as the Ministry of Construction denied to issue the permit to the investor in October, who, nevertheless, claimed that he already sold majority of apartments which are yet to be built.

The history of the projects prompted investigative journalist who explored the story. It turned out that the Dutch are only partners, so it is not a Dutch project. Gogoljev himself admitted that he is close friend to Belgrade's City architect Milutin Folić and that Folić personally directed him where to invest, including the Beko parcel and the surrounding lots. Gogoljev's friend and attorney is Igor Isailović, also a close friend and attorney of Siniša Mali, who was a mayor when Gogoljev obtained the parcels. Gogoljev also acknowledged that Isailović, who was also a business partner with Serbian prime minister and Mali's school friend Ana Brnabić, connected him with the representatives of the previous Greek owners, who sold him the parcels. When the new project was announced, Mali, Folić and the Dutch were all present. Gogoljev resold the "Beko" building in April 2018, which is now planned as the separate business building, surrounded by the "K Distrikt".

New urban project was done by the bureau of Ana Uskoković, collaborator of Folić's private family architecture bureau. Originally presented as the collaborator on the project, Boris Podrecca who already authored several controversial projects in Belgrade with the Mali administration, later refused to comment the "K Distrikt" project. As of November 2018 the partially demolished old "Beko" building was still standing. The building was purchased by the "Marera Properties" company which started the reconstruction of the building. The renovated "Beko", with the original façade kept, will have a total floor area of 21.000 m^{2} (226.04 sq ft) and should be transformed into the A-class commercial facility by the end of 2019. Despite the fact that the exterior of the building had to be preserved, it was allowed for the investor to add the seventh floor. The reconstructed building will be renamed as "Kalemegdan Business Center".

New Dorćol

The easternmost, industrialized section of Dorćol, was redeveloped in the late 2010s as Novi Dorćol ("New Dorćol"). It is located south of the Belgrade Port complex, and east of the, also heavily industrialized, Viline Vode neighborhood. The area contains some of the oldest factories in Belgrade, including "Platnara" (cloth factory), built in 1897 (after Communist takeover "David Pajić Daka"), Belgrade Wool Industry or the chemical plant "Duga". City plans from 2011 envisioned demolition of the now defunct industrial facilities and construction of the residential and business complex. Construction of New Dorćol began in 2017, and the first phase was finished in 2021.

Parts of old, authentic industrial architecture, have been preserved and included into the new structures. Some of the preserved piles of cast iron from the old engineering hall were embedded in the construction of the renovated "Platnara", while others are laid out as monuments in the inner yard. Some parts of the old, brick facade were cut out and placed on the new facades at the ground floor level. The entire neighborhood will spread over 2 hectares (4.9 acres), and on the north it will be bounded by the planned linear park.

== Culture and image ==
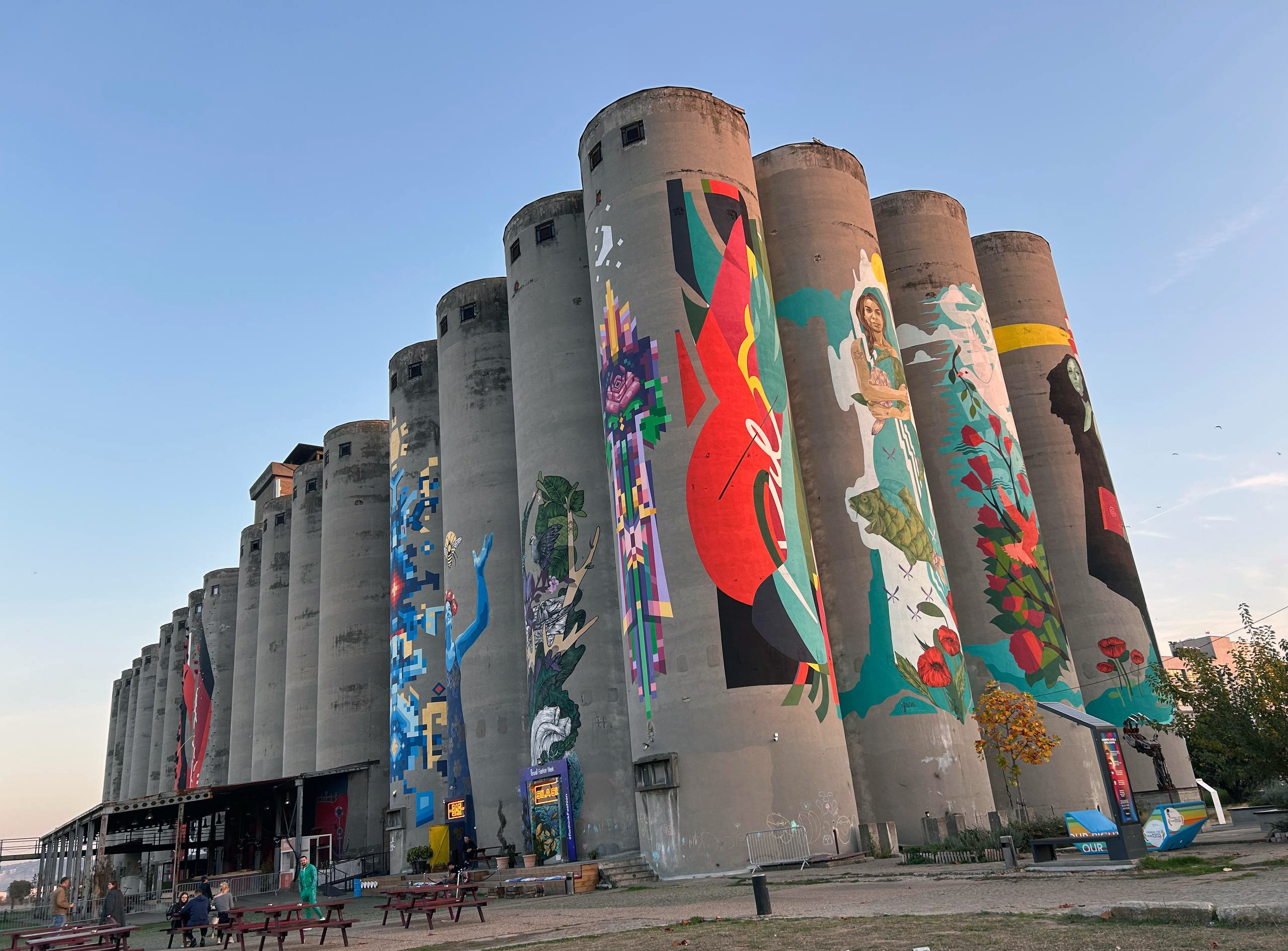
Silosi, a popular hangout spot for young people

The building of the former Dorćol Elementary School, built in 1893, was declared a cultural monument. The school was built by Milan Kapetanović at the corner of Cara Dušana and Dubrovačka street, in the Academicism style, and became the blueprint for future school buildings in Serbia. Since 1927 it was renamed to Serbian Royal Elementary School, adapted and organized by the strict construction rules regarding modern and hygienic standards. It was later renamed to "Janko Veselinović", and today it hosts the Technical School for Woodworks "Drvo-art".

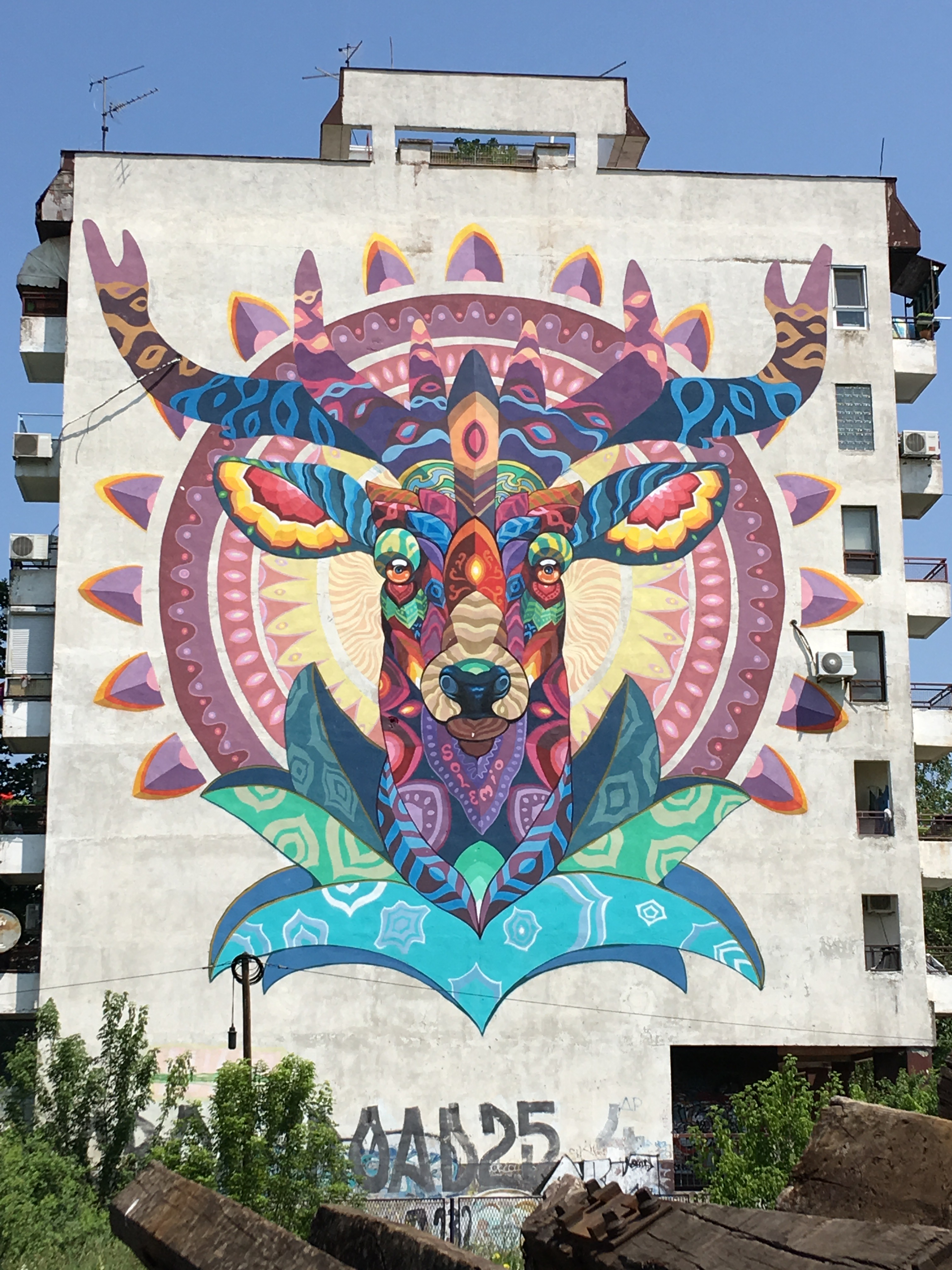
Farid Rueda, Sole Mio mural, Runaway Festival, Dorćol, Tadeuša Košćuška 88b, 2019

On 22 September 1924, the technical aviation school was founded in the newly constructed building at the modern address 2 Bulevar Vojvode Bojovića. After World War II it was adapted into the aviation middle school "Petar Drapšin", and since 2004 it is renamed to the Aviation Academy. On 21 December 2011 it became the authorized center of the Eurocontrol. In 2021 a Higher School of Aviation Studies was founded by the government and also seated in the same building.

The Museum of Vuk and Dositej in Gospodar Jevremova street was officially opened in 1949 and dedicated to Dositej Obradović, a novelist, major Serbian enlightener and first minister of education, and Vuk Karadžić, the most important Serbian language reformer. The building itself is older and it was the seat of the former Belgrade Higher School, which became the University of Belgrade.

Memorial plaque was placed at the corner of the Višnjićeva and Simina streets on 8 March 1970. It commemorates the murder of Mirosanda "Rosa" Satarić, which occurred on 22 June 1968. Former war militia member and executioner Milorad Golubović for a long time stalked and harassed much younger Satarić, married mother of two, before he riddled her with bullets in the street, in broad daylight, while she held her 7-years old daughter's hand. Due to the relatively unusual type of crime for a Communist country, cold-bloodedness of the execution, and subsequent behavior of the killer, the case became a cause célèbre. With apparent abolition of the killer by the state, this all prompted months long public protests at the crime scene. Retired Golubović, who claimed to have killed 1,000 people as an executioner, said that he had every right to kill Satarić cause she was rejecting his advances. He was sentenced to death, which was then commuted to 20 years, but it is not known how much time, if any, he spent in prison. He died in his 80s. The plaque was moved to the ground level later and deteriorated, but on 8 March 2022 it was fully restored and placed on the façade again.

Galerija fresaka (Gallery of the Frescoes) was opened in 1973. It hosts the reproduction of the most important frescoes from the Serbian medieval monasteries (11th-15th century, many of them located today in Montenegro and North Macedonia), including the famed White Angel from Mileševa. The gallery is part of the National Museum of Serbia.

In March 2021, it was announced that the Faculty of Music Arts, part of the University of Arts in Belgrade, will relocate to Dorćol. It will be incorporated into the projected linear park, in the section between the Marina Dorćol and Port of Belgrade. In February 2022 the design was selected by the city, work of "Biro 81000" from Podgorica, Montenegro. It will be built within the scopes of the line park. A 28 m (92 ft) tall, six-storey building with the total floor area of 3 ha (7.4 acres) will consists of three lower floors made of the corten steel, and upper three made of aluminum "musical" boxes and pipes which represent wires of the musical instruments.

Other important features are the avant-garde BITEF Theater on the Square of Mira Trailović, the monument to the Greek national hero Rigas Feraios (who was killed by the Turks in the nearby Kalemegdan), Ethnographic museum, Jewish museum, Pedagogical museum, Museum of the Theatrical Arts, Pančić Park (1.39 hectares (3.4 acres)), Park Gundulićev Venac (5.21 ares (5,610 sq ft)), and the Academic park with the PMF, The faculty for the natural sciences and mathematics.

Leading Serbian female novelist Svetlana Velmar-Janković wrote a book titled Dorćol, composed of short stories, each named after a street in Dorćol.

Dorćol experienced artistic revitalization since the 2000s. The neighborhood is known for its eclectic gallery of murals. They are work of artistic group "GTR" (Grobarski treš romantizam - Grobari's trash romanticism), who are part of the Grobari, organized supporters group of the football club Partizan. Some of the murals depict Joe Strummer (with inscription The future is not yet written), Morrissey (To die by your side is such a heavenly way to die), Eddy Grant (I wanna show you Belgrade), George Orwell (Freedom is the right to tell people what they do not want to hear) and Duško Radović (Today is Sunday). In July 2023, street art artist Andrej Josifovski painted a mural dedicated to the first Serbian female architect, Jelisaveta Načić, at 15 Gospodar Jevremova Street.

The revitalization was spontaneous, on the initiative of young artists and without major investments, which enhanced Dorćol's "autochthonous soul". Small houses with flower gardens have been renovated, some new buildings, up to five floors have been built, and numerous cafes, clubs and bakeries have been opened. Dorćol has been compared to New York City's Bushwick neighborhood of Brooklyn, as the Serbian version of refining the working neighborhood. Young artists, chefs and musicians are centered around the Dorćol Platz artistic establishment. Being known as family and pet friendly, the revitalized neighborhood is described as "part of the city with soul and spirit, social interactions, place of recreation with old linden trees and other details, which breathes warmth and organic communication with its surroundings". The movement was seen as a "self-developed, slightly poorish", especially compared to the new, generally disliked neighborhoods like Belgrade Waterfront.

The Time Out magazine listed Dorćol on its 2019 list of the 50 coolest neighborhoods in the world, while The Guardian named it on its 2016 list of 10 of the best alternative city tours in Europe, and 2020 list of 10 of the coolest neighborhoods in Europe.

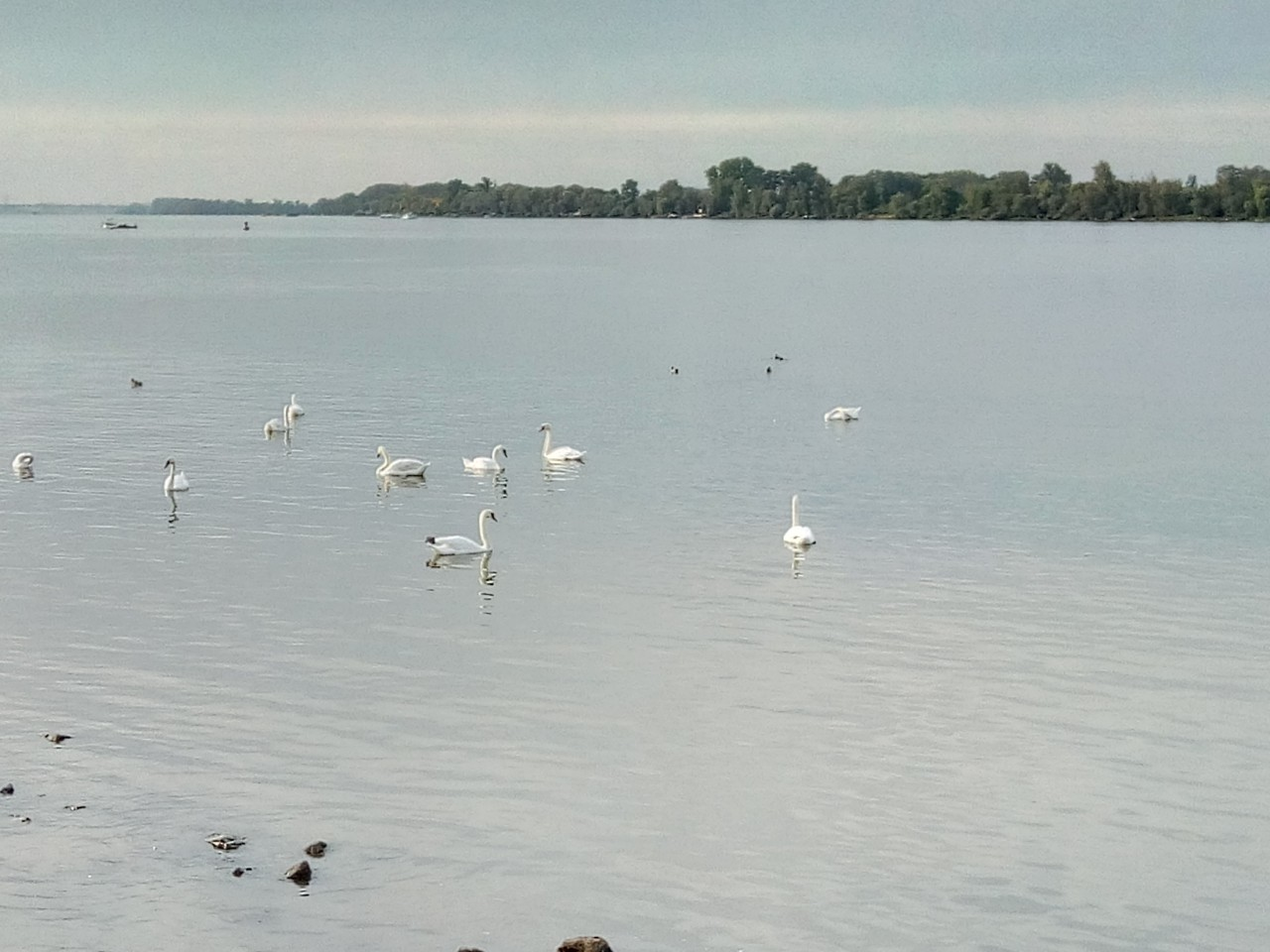
Swans at Danube Quay

== Sport and recreation ==
Neglected for many years, the sports and recreational complex of "Milan Gale Muškatirović" (formerly and better known as "25. maj") is also located on the riverside. The clay tennis courts have been restored in 2009 to host the Serbia Open, held for the first time from 4–10 May 2009. Bank around the complex is, with the altitude of 75.3 meters above sea level, one of the lowest parts of Belgrade urban area.

Dorćol Rugby league Club won eleven consecutive Serbian Rugby League Championship titles (2002–2013) and are current "double crown" (domestic championship and Cup) holders (See Rugby league in Serbia). Dorćol RLC is the most decorated sports club in the neighbourhood and alongside Handball Club, Wrestling Club is founder of Dorćol Sport Association. Football Club and Boxing Club are likely to join the association.

Based on the request of the members of the Dorćol Rugby League Club, Dorćol rapper Škabo alongside DJ Ape and beatmaker Šonsi Ras made a song named "Dorćol" - both the anthem of the club and dedication to the neighbourhood - and published it on his album Remek delo in 2008.
