= Church of St. Alexander Nevsky, Belgrade =

Serbian Orthodox church in Belgrade, Serbia

Coordinates: 44°49′14″N 20°27′58″E

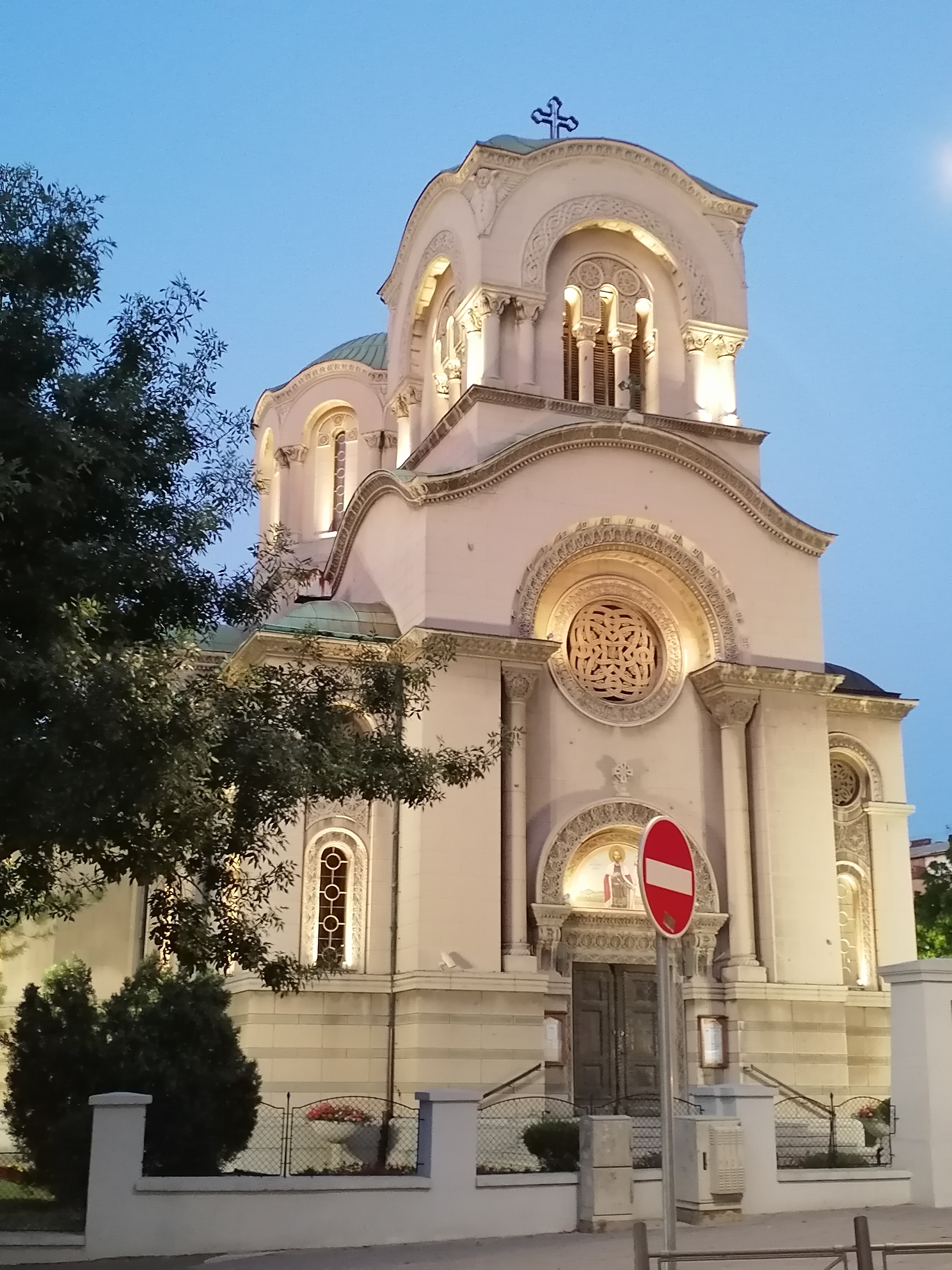
The Alexander Nevsky Church in Belgrade

The Church of St. Alexander Nevsky (Serbian: Црква Светог Александра Невског, romanized: Crkva Svetog Aleksandra Nevskog) is a Serbian Orthodox church in Belgrade, Serbia.

== Capucines monastery and hospital ==
During the Austrian occupation of northern Serbia 1717-39, several hospitals were established in Belgrade. The Capucines were granted to do missionary work in Belgrade on 23 August 1718, by the Emperor's decision. They were given one of the mosques which they adapted and dedicated to the Virgin Mary. On the city plans, their monastery is located just within the outer walls, next to the Emperor's Gate. They possibly arranged the Bajram-beg mosque, also known as the Stambol mosque, below the modern National Theatre in Belgrade, approximately on the location of the modern Church of St. Alexander Nevsky. The Capucines had only 9 monks by 1725 which was quite insufficient for their duties. They were handling all the Catholics in the occupied area, proclaimed by the Austrian court as the Kingdom of Serbia. They also took religious care of the soldiers which were scattered over the region, but they only had 2 parochial priests. Still, they turned over 1,000 imperial soldiers from Protestantism into Catholicism. They originally took care of the ill all over Belgrade, in the fortress, existing hospitals and private houses. In the letter of an unknown city clerk from 10 November 1736, sent to the Vicar Provincial of the order in Vienna, it was mentioned that the Capucines asked for the field hospital to be established. It would take care of the soldiers and have place for 1,500 people. Military commander of Belgrade agreed, providing permanent pay and food for the monks who would treat the soldiers. There was enough space next to their monastery for such a facility. Still, the care of the soldiers was first offered to the Jesuits, but they refused. Names of two especially dedicated Capucine priests are preserved in the documents: Father Oswaldus and Father Chrysogonus.

== Church of St. Alexander Nevsky ==
It was built in the style of Morava school in 1877. It is located in the Dorćol in the municipality of Stari Grad. Like all Alexander Nevsky Cathedrals and churches, it is named after the Russian national Saint Alexander Nevsky. The church belongs to archeparchy of Belgrade and Karlovci of the Serbian Orthodox Church.

A first church was built in 1877, but the plan for a larger church was raised in 1912. Architect Jelisaveta Načić was chosen. The foundation was consecrated in 1912, but construction was delayed due to the World War I, so that the end of construction in 1928 or 1929.

The Church was established as a cultural monument in 1983. by Serbian institute for Protection of Monuments
