= Silicone Valley =

Silicone Valley may refer to:

- A misspelling of Silicon Valley, nickname for the Santa Clara Valley, also known as the South Bay area of San Francisco, the location of many American high tech companies
- San Fernando Valley, a pioneering region for the pornography industry; nickname coined as a pun on Silicon Valley, but referring to silicone breast implants rather than silicon chips
- Strahinjića Bana in Dorćol, a neighborhood of Belgrade, Serbia, frequented by many "trophy" women (allegedly with breast implants), see Dorćol #Features
