= Načić =

Origin
- Language: Serbo-Croatian

Načić (Serbian Cyrillic: Начић) is a Serbian surname. The surname Načić originally comes from Kosovo (the town of Lipjan near Priština), and today it can be found throughout Serbia, especially in Požarevac. The surname has been recorded in Paraćin (slava of Mitrovdan), Prizren, Šabac, and Zaječar (from where Taško Načić's family hails).

It may refer to:

- Jelisaveta Načić (1878–1955), Serbian architect
- Taško Načić (1934–1993), Serbian actor
