= Dorćol Elementary School =

Coordinates: 44°49′26″N 20°27′36″E

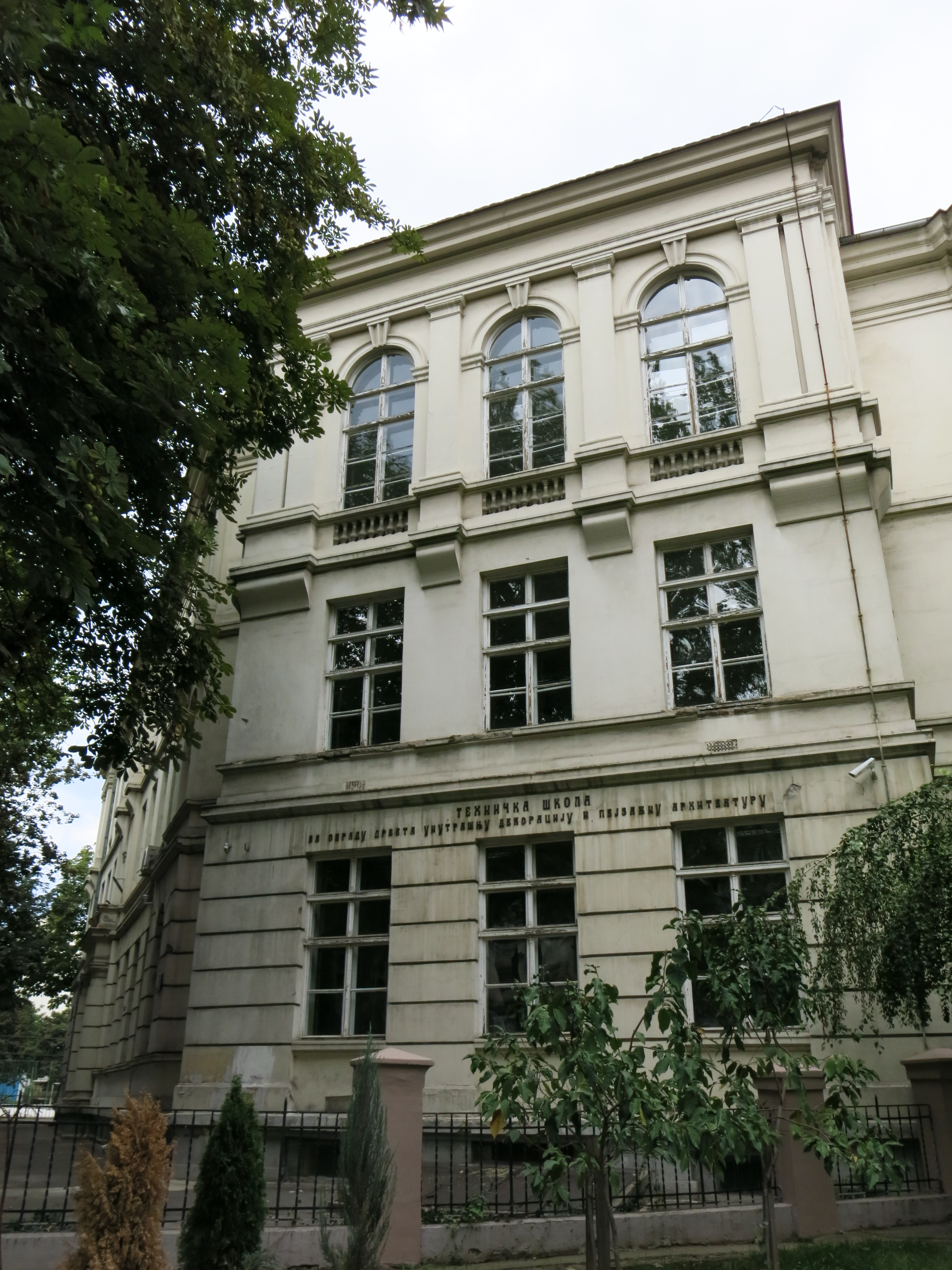
- Dorćol Elementary School

General information
- Type: Cultural monument
- Location: Stari grad
- Town or city: Belgrade
- Country: Serbia
- Completed: 1893.

Elementary school at Dorćol is located in Belgrade, in 23, Cara Dušana Street, and it has the status of a cultural monument.

== Architecture ==
Dorćol Elementary School was built in 1893 according to the project of the architect Milan Kapetanović in the academic style of the 19th century. According to the "Rules on the construction of schools and school furniture" in 1881, the building was composed as a corner building and is one of the first schools in Belgrade that were special, modern and hygienic in terms of construction, erected as a whole. The building fulfilled all the conditions for the operation of such an institution, ranging from the use of building materials to the layout of the rooms, their size, lighting and more. The building was designed with a ground floor and two floors. The author formed three representative facades by plunging the angle. The two that meet each other are symmetrical, of equal number and arrangement of the window openings with emphasized entrance, balcony and bay window according to an axis of symmetry of both facades which are derived in neorenaissance style. The school has a basement, ground floor and first floor, with sixteen classrooms. It was built of brick in lime mortar, with wooden structures, except above the basement where shallow vaults are present. Vertical communication is carried out in each wing with one staircase. The school represented the model for all future school construction in Serbia, in terms of reached European ranking of programs and design, which is reflected in a number of innovations, of construction and design character, and in the equipping of all installations and facilities (gym, swimming pool, changing rooms, auditorium) as well, hitherto unknown in primary schools in Serbia. Opus of the architect Milan Kapetanović is important in the study of architecture of Belgrade between two centuries. Until 1927, Dorćol Elementary School was known as the "Serbian Royal Elementary School", later the Technical school for wood processing, interior decoration and landscape architecture. Kapetanović also worked on a similar example of a public building for the State class lottery. Milan Kapetanović did a lot in the field of residential architecture of Belgrade.

== See also ==
- Dorćol
