= Dragutin Gavrilović =

Serbian soldier

- Драгутин Гавриловић
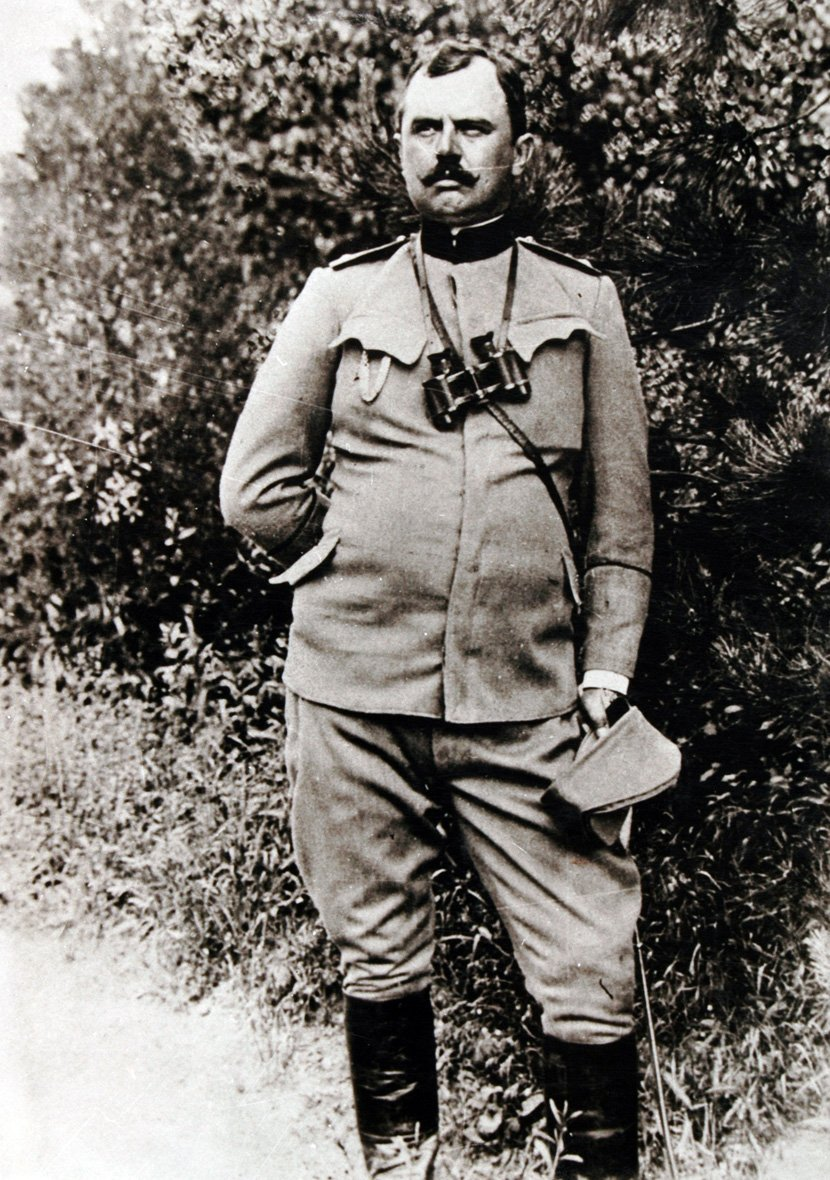
- Dragutin Gavrilović
- Born: 25 May 1882; Čačak, Serbia
- Died: 19 July 1945 (aged 63); Belgrade, Yugoslavia
- Military career
- Allegiance: Kingdom of Serbia; Kingdom of Yugoslavia
- Rank: Major (most famous), Colonel (last)
- Unit: 2nd battalion of the 10th Infantry Regiment (most famous)
- Conflicts: First Balkan War; Second Balkan War; World War I World War II
- Awards: Karadjordje's star, Croix de Guerre

Dragutin Gavrilović (Serbian Cyrillic: Драгутин Гавриловић; 25 May 1882 – 19 July 1945) was a Serbian and Yugoslav military officer, best known for his heroic defense of Belgrade during the First World War.

== Biography ==
Dragutin Gavrilović was born in Čačak, Serbia, in 1882. After his graduation from the Military Academy of Serbia in 1901, he took part in every war the Serbian army fought until World War II.

He is best remembered in Serbian history books for his dramatic order to his troops issued on October 7, 1915, the first day of the defense of Belgrade against the Austro-Hungarian and German attack during the First World War. Holding the rank of major, Gavrilović at the time commanded the 2nd battalion of the 10th Infantry Regiment, which, along with a detachment of Belgrade gendarmerie and a group of about 340 volunteers from Syrmia, was defending positions at the very confluence of Sava and Danube, beneath the Kalemegdan Fortress. In the early morning, Austro-Hungarian troops attacked across the rivers after a heavy two-day artillery barrage; the Serbians in a series of counterattacks trapped the invaders against the Danube with heavy casualties on both sides. The Serbian position grew worse every minute because of an incessant flow of Austro-Hungarian reinforcements and a vast superiority in artillery, which the Serbs countered by employing close-quarter tactics.

The Serbs had their last stand in front of the "Jasenica" kafana, there the soldiers took flowers from a small flower shop and put them on their coats and on their guns as they prepared for one last charge into certain death. Before throwing them into a counterattack, Major Gavrilović rallied them with a call to arms:

Soldiers, exactly at three o'clock, the enemy is to be crushed by your fierce charge, destroyed by your grenades and bayonets. The honor of Belgrade, our capital, must not be stained. Soldiers! Heroes! The supreme command has erased our regiment from its records. Our regiment has been sacrificed for the honor of Belgrade and the Fatherland. Therefore, you no longer need to worry about your lives: they no longer exist. So, forward to glory! For the King and the Fatherland! Long live the King, Long live Belgrade!

The desperate charge that followed, in which Gavrilović was badly wounded, failed to destroy the Austro-Hungarian bridgehead. The timely intervention of Austro-Hungarian river monitors which approached the shore to deliver point-blank artillery fire with much-reduced fear of hitting their own troops, and to which the engaged Serbian units had no effective counter, played a major role in defeating the attack. But the charge and similar acts of bravery and self-sacrifice by Serbian troops and by the inhabitants of Belgrade during the battle earned deep respect from the invaders, who suffered around 10,000 casualties in the course of capturing the city. The German commander August von Mackensen himself erected a monument on the battleground commemorating the city's zealous defenders; it still stands to this day and is inscribed with the words "Here Rest Serbian Heroes" in German and Serbian, a rare example in military history, of one army building a monument to their enemies.

Gavrilović was carried back by the survivors of his regiment, he was awarded the Serbian war medal, Karadjordje's star, the French Croix de Guerre, among others.

After surviving the defense of Belgrade, he withdrew with the Serbian army to Corfu, and after the breakthrough of the Thessaloniki front, Vojvoda Petar Bojović proposed him for a higher rank, but Vojvoda Stepa Stepanović did not accept that, explaining that he was too young.

He was not favored among the officers, because he did not belong to any secret organization, such as Black Hand or White Hand. After the war, he took the general exam in Štip in 1930, but failed. Gavrilović was offended and did not want to take it again.

After the Great War, he lectured military administration at the Military Academy in Belgrade. On 27 March 1941, General Dušan Simović offered him the rank of general and the position of Minister of the Army and Navy, but he refused, explaining that he was not interested in the proposal and that he was a soldier.

After Yugoslav capitulation in the April War, Colonel Gavrilović was captured in Sarajevo and taken to a prisoner of war camp near Nuremberg, where he was repeatedly offered to be released due to his age and rank but he refused. He returned from captivity only in 1945, seriously ill. He was in the collection center in Banjica for seven days, where he recovered a little. Then he came home, to his apartment on Slavija, where he died ten days later. Malnourishment during the captivity was one of the main factors contributing to Gavrilović's death. Gavrilović was buried wearing a colonel's uniform of the Royal Yugoslavian Army at the New Cemetery in Belgrade. His family was considered part of the old regime and was discriminated against by the communist authorities. His daughters had difficulty finding a job in post-war Belgrade and the family was being denied his military pension for over a decade after the war has ended. However, rumors about Gavrilović's imprisonment, rape of both of his daughters, and his eventual murder at the hands of the new communist regime were dismissed by his own family members as recently as 2011.

== Legacy and honors ==
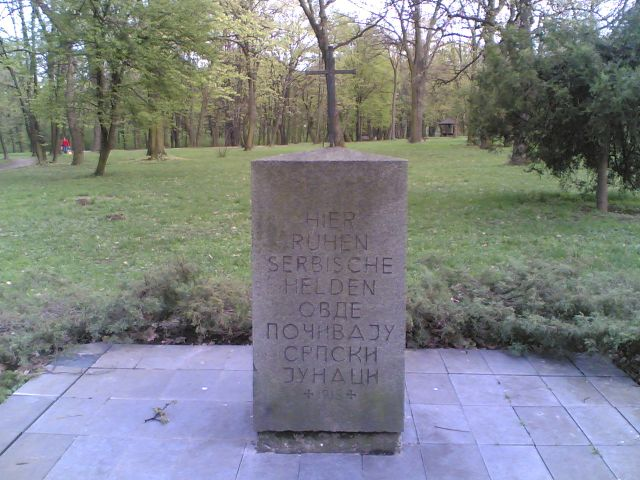
Kosutnjak park, WWI monument erected by German Field Marshal August von Mackensen to the Serbian defenders of Belgrade The inscription reads "Here rest Serbian heroes"

A street stretching along the Danube riverbank in the Dorćol area of Belgrade (where Gavrilović and his men fought) bears the name Major Gavrilović's riverbank in his memory. There are also streets bearing his name in the cities of Kragujevac Niš, Čačak, Valjevo, Zrenjanin, Užice and Bijeljina.

Swedish heavy metal band Sabaton wrote the song "Last Dying Breath" from their album The Last Stand in his honor, referencing quotes by him in the lyrics.

Album title "Naši životi više ne postoje" ("Our lives no longer exist") by the Croatian black metal band Prognan, as well as the eponymous track form the album, directly reference Gavrilović's speech. The album itself tells a conceptual storyline about a Serbian soldier who endures and survives the trials and tribulations of World War I.
