= Kumanudi =

Kumanudi (Serbian Cyrillic: Кумануди ) is a Serbian-Aromanian surname derived from the Vlach given name "Kuman". Notable people with the surname include:

- Kosta Kumanudi (1874–1962), Serbian and Yugoslav politician

== See also ==
- Koumanoudi, Greek form
