= Steam Bath of the Brothers Krsmanović =

Steam Bath of Brothers Krsmanović
- Парно купатило браће Крсмановић; Parno kupatilo braće Krsmanović
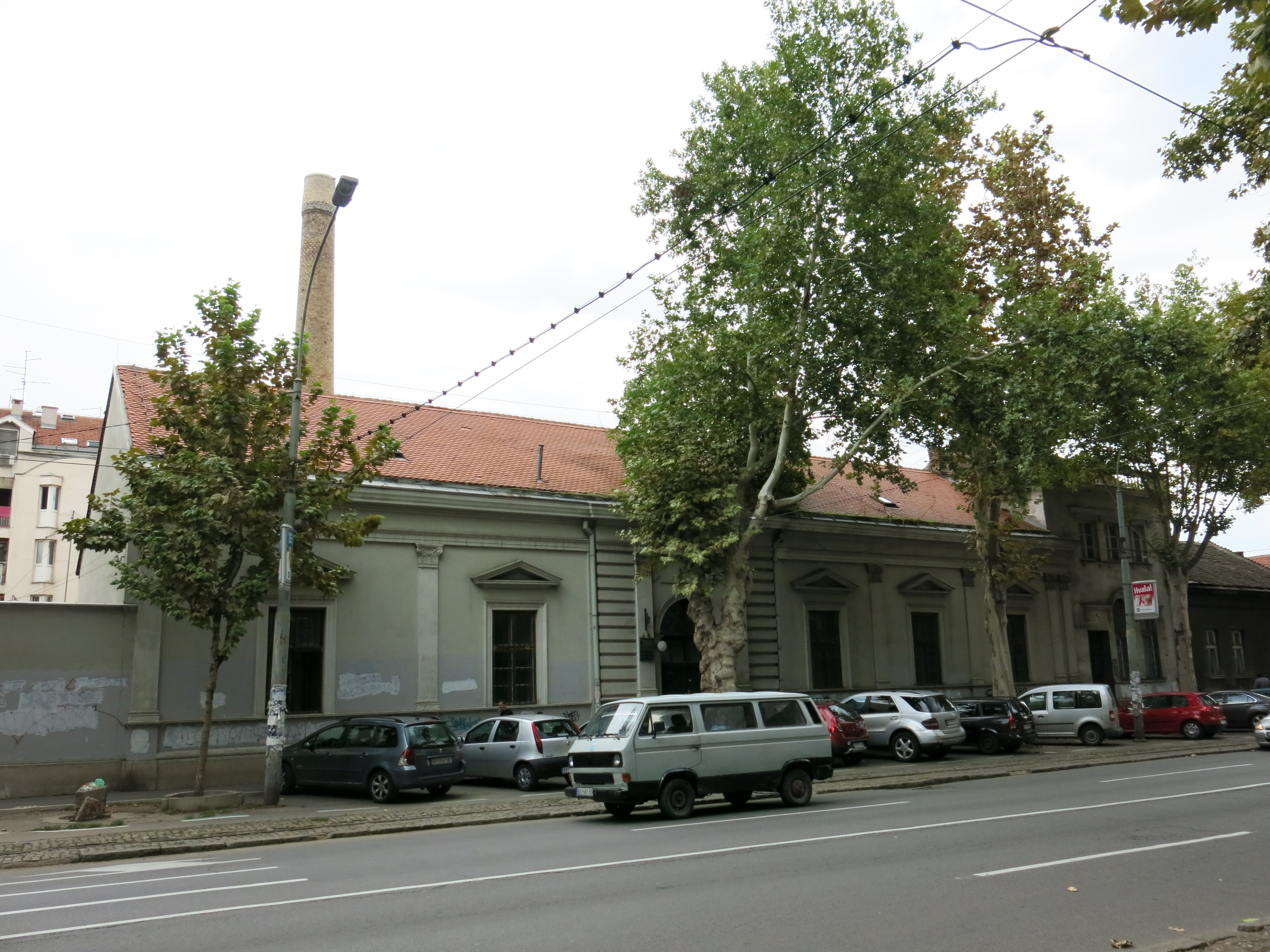
- Steam Bath of Brothers Krsmanović

General information
- Type: Cultural monument
- Location: Stari Grad, Belgrade, Serbia
- Coordinates: 44.822079°N 20.462959°E
- Construction started: 1901
- Completed: 1920s

The Steam Bath of Brothers Krsmanović is the former public bath in Belgrade, the capital of Serbia. Built from 1901 to the 1920s around the former hamam from the 18th century, it was the last operational public bath in Belgrade, until it was closed in 2004. In 2001 the edifice was declared a cultural monument. The first public swimming pool in Belgrade was opened in the venue in 1904.

== Location ==
The bath is located at 45 Cara Dušana street. It is situated in the Stari Grad municipality's neighborhood of Dorćol.

== History ==
=== Origin ===
The predecessor of the modern bath was a former hamam, or Turkish bathhouse. Called "Small Hamam", it was recorded in the Turkish plan from 1863; however, it probably originated from the 18th century.

=== 20th century ===
The present complex of the Steam Bath of Brothers Krsmanović began to develop in 1901 around the former hamam and it was finished by the 1920s. The venue was later renamed the "Public hot bath Dunav". In 1904, the first public swimming pool in the city was opened in the bath. Built on the spring of warm water, it was advertised at the time as the "modern hamam". The pool was 25 by 12 m (82 by 39 ft) and had a diving platform and other attraction of the day.

Original owner of the bath was artisan Petar J. Petrović (1854-1921), who worked as the "king's and court's artistic fitter". His father was Josef Schauengel, who migrated to Serbia, became military medic with the rank of major and changed his name to Jovan Petrović. The Petrović family later sold the venue to the brothers Krsmanović. After World War II, the object became colloquially known as the "People's bath".

=== 21st century ===
In 2004 the facility was closed due to the safety concerns as the standards for the safe public use, both for the building and the installations, were not reached. Also, the profitability was low, which was one of the reasons that all other bathhouses were closed in Belgrade. Users of the bath were of low economic stature in general: people who had no bathrooms in their houses, poor and homeless people, students, pensioners, seasonal workers, sellers on the green markets who slept in trucks or market stalls, etc.

The house was declared a cultural monument in 2001. After closing, the venue was occasionally loaned by the city government, for the production of music videos, private parties, exhibitions and as the movie sets; however, by 2017, the facility deteriorated a lot.

In 2008, city government decided to do something with the facility and the architectural design competition for the best solution was set. Three projects were chosen, but nothing has done. In 2012, the Red Cross of the Palilula municipality started an initiative to reopen the bath, as it was estimated that there are between 3,000 and 5,000 homeless people in Belgrade who can't have a bath anywhere else. The Ministry of Culture later announced an idea of turning the bath into the international cultural center so the staff members from the embassies of Austria, France, Turkey and Iran visited the venue. The idea was revived by Gunnar B. Kvaran, director of the Oslo's Astrup Fearnley Museum of Modern Art, who visited the bath in July 2017. In October 2017, during the visit of the high state delegation from Ankara, Serbian and Turkish governments signed a memorandum on restoration of the object, but the details were not disclosed.

Two governments signed another protocol in December 2018. According to this, part of the bath will retain its original purpose. Another part will be transformed into the classrooms, halls, library, gallery and administrative offices. Part of the building will be used by the Turkish Yunus Emre Institute, but again, no dates were given.

== Architecture ==
The architect of the complex is unknown. The house was designed in the style of Academism. It is projected as the ground-floor building with an emphasized side avant-corps, which ends with a balustrade in the zone of the roof. In the central part of the symmetrical façade lies a portal that ends with a semicircular shape, surmounted by a triangular pediment. Shallow pilasters with decoratively processed capitals separate windows topped by triangular tympanums. The glass on the double door at the entrance is decorated with garlands. In general, the ornamentation of the object is quite simple and modest.

On the inside, a circular hamam pool and a smaller polygonal pool with cold water are located in the center. The bases of the facility with the circular pool, as well as the canals below the pool, are the remains of the former Turkish "Little Hamam". The chimney is large and made of cricks, in the factory-style chimneys.

== See also ==
- List of cultural monuments in Belgrade
