= Kujundžić =

Kujundžić (Serbian Cyrillic: Кујунџић) is a Serbo-Croatian surname, an occupational surname derived from kujundžija, a Turkism meaning "goldsmith". It may refer to:

- Milan Kujundžić Aberdar (1842–1893), Serbian poet, philosopher and politician
- Milan Kujundžić (born 1957), Croatian politician
- Lazar Kujundžić (1880–1905), Serbian guerrilla fighter
- Bogoljub Kujundžić (1887–1949), Serbian politician
