= Jelisaveta Načić =

Serbian architect

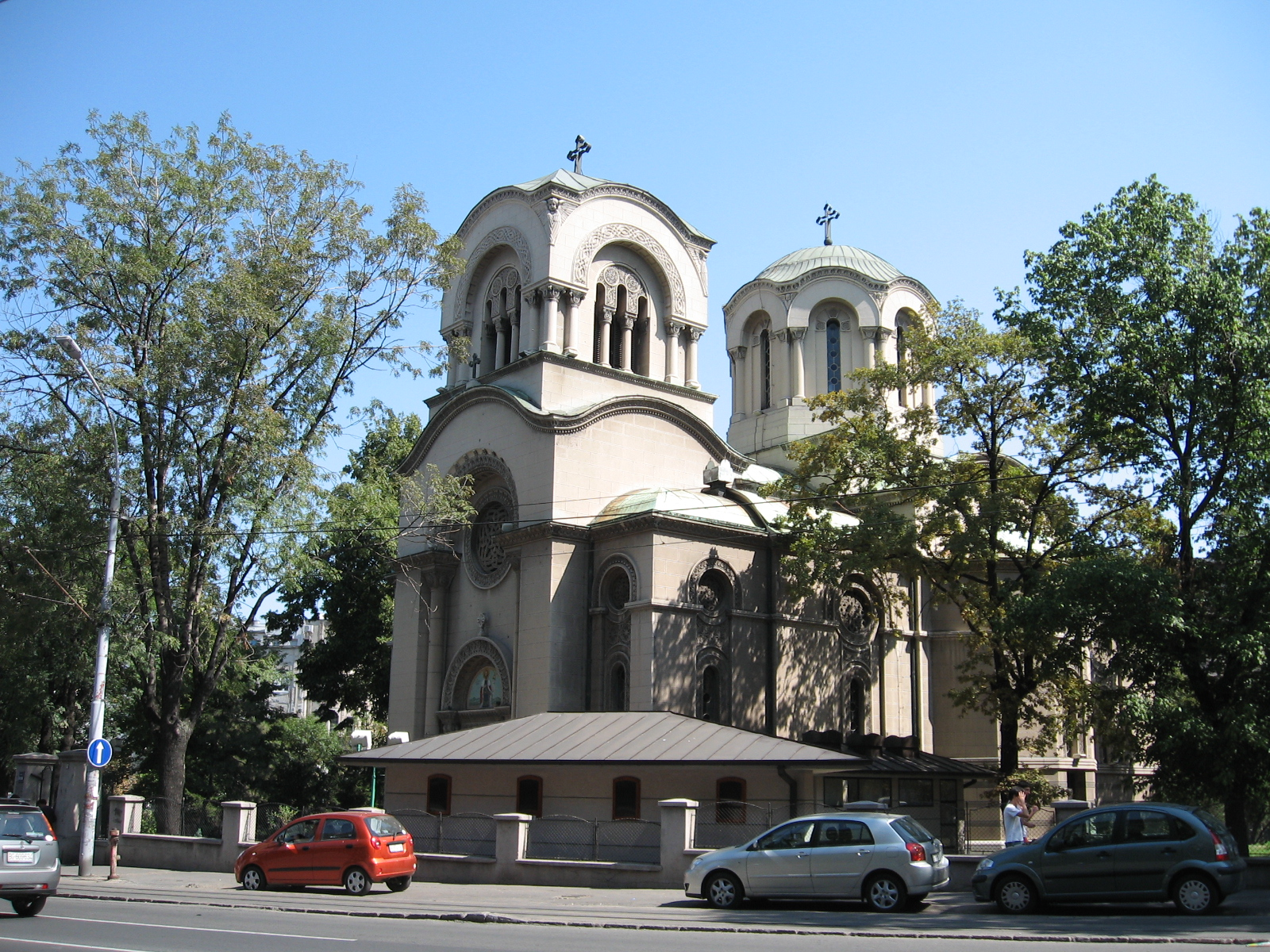
Jelisaveta Načić: Alexander Nevsky Church, Belgrade (1929)

Jelisaveta Načić (31 December 1878 – 6 June 1955) was a notable Serbian architect. She is remembered as a pioneer who inspired women to enter professions which had earlier been reserved for men. Not only the first female graduate in architecture in Belgrade, she was also the first female architect in Serbia.

== Biography ==
Born in Belgrade, Načić matriculated from school with excellent results in 1896. She went on to study architecture at the University of Belgrade's School of Architecture at a time when it was felt that women should not enter the profession. At the age of 22, she was the first woman to graduate from the Faculty of Engineering. She sought employment at the Ministry of Construction, but was unable to become an official, as there was a requirement for military service to have been completed. She did however succeed in gaining a position as an architect with the Municipality of Belgrade, where she became the city's first chief architect. In 1903, she designed the Little Staircase in Belgrade's Kalemegdan Park. Her most notable work is the well-proportioned school building she completed in 1906, now known as the Kralj Petar I (King Peter I) Elementary School. She also designed churches, including the Moravian-styled Alexander Nevsky Church (1929) in Belgrade and a smaller church in Kosovo. The hospital she designed was destroyed during the Second World War, but many of her residential buildings from apartments to distinctive private homes, some with Art Nouveau or Neo-Renaissance elements, still stand today. The first collective housing building for workers on Balkan was designed by Jelisaveta Načić.

During World War I, she was interned in the Nezsider (today Neusiedl am See, Austria) concentration camp in Hungary, bringing her artistic career to an end. It had lasted no more than 16 years. After the war, Načić moved to Dubrovnik with her Albanian husband, Luka Lukai, whom she had met in the camp. She was awarded a state pension for her life accomplishments. She died in Dubrovnik in 1955.

== See also ==
- Women in architecture
- Jovanka Bončić-Katerinić
