= Nightlife in Belgrade =

Entertainment scene in Belgrade, Serbia

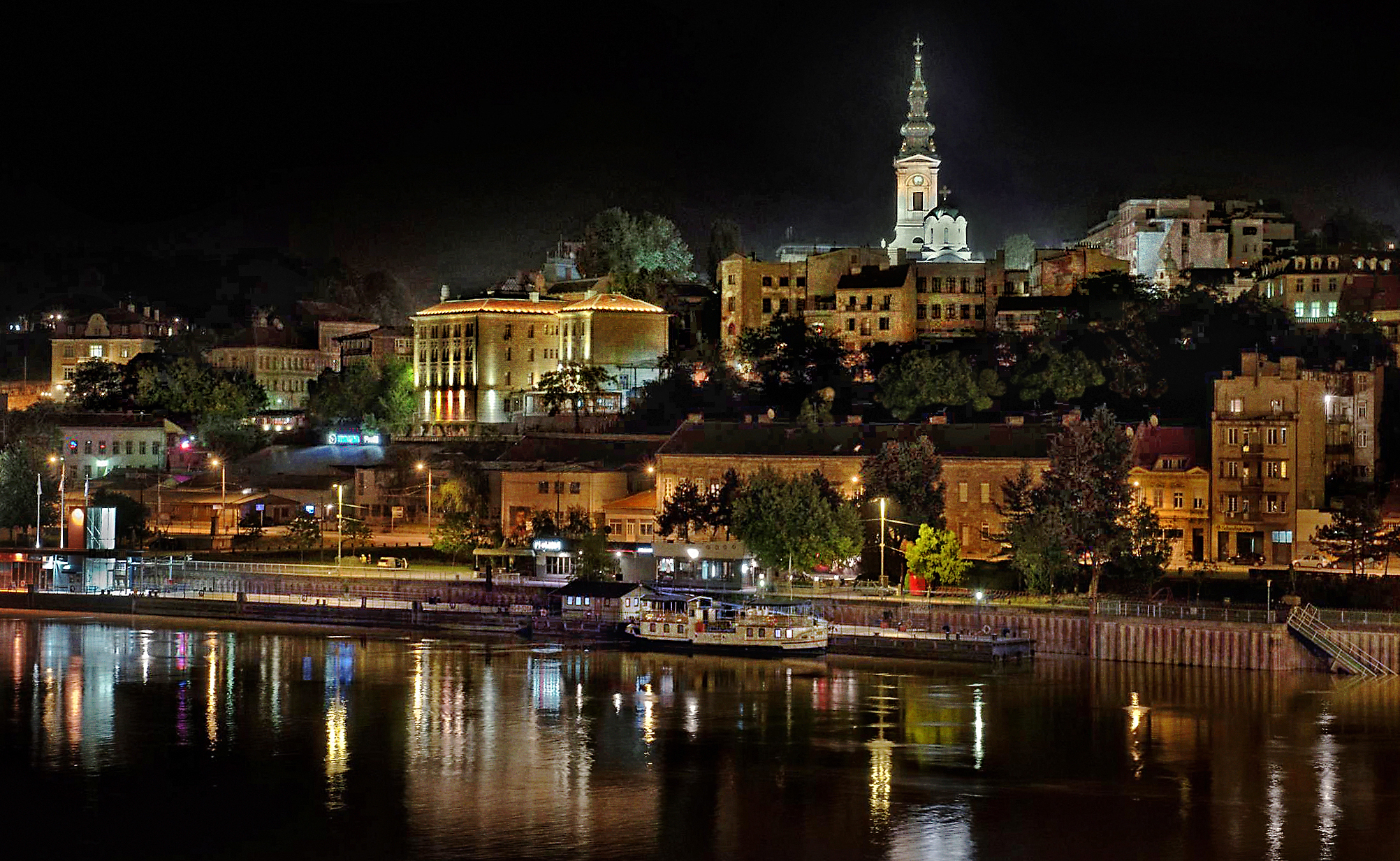
Night view of Belgrade, from the Sava river

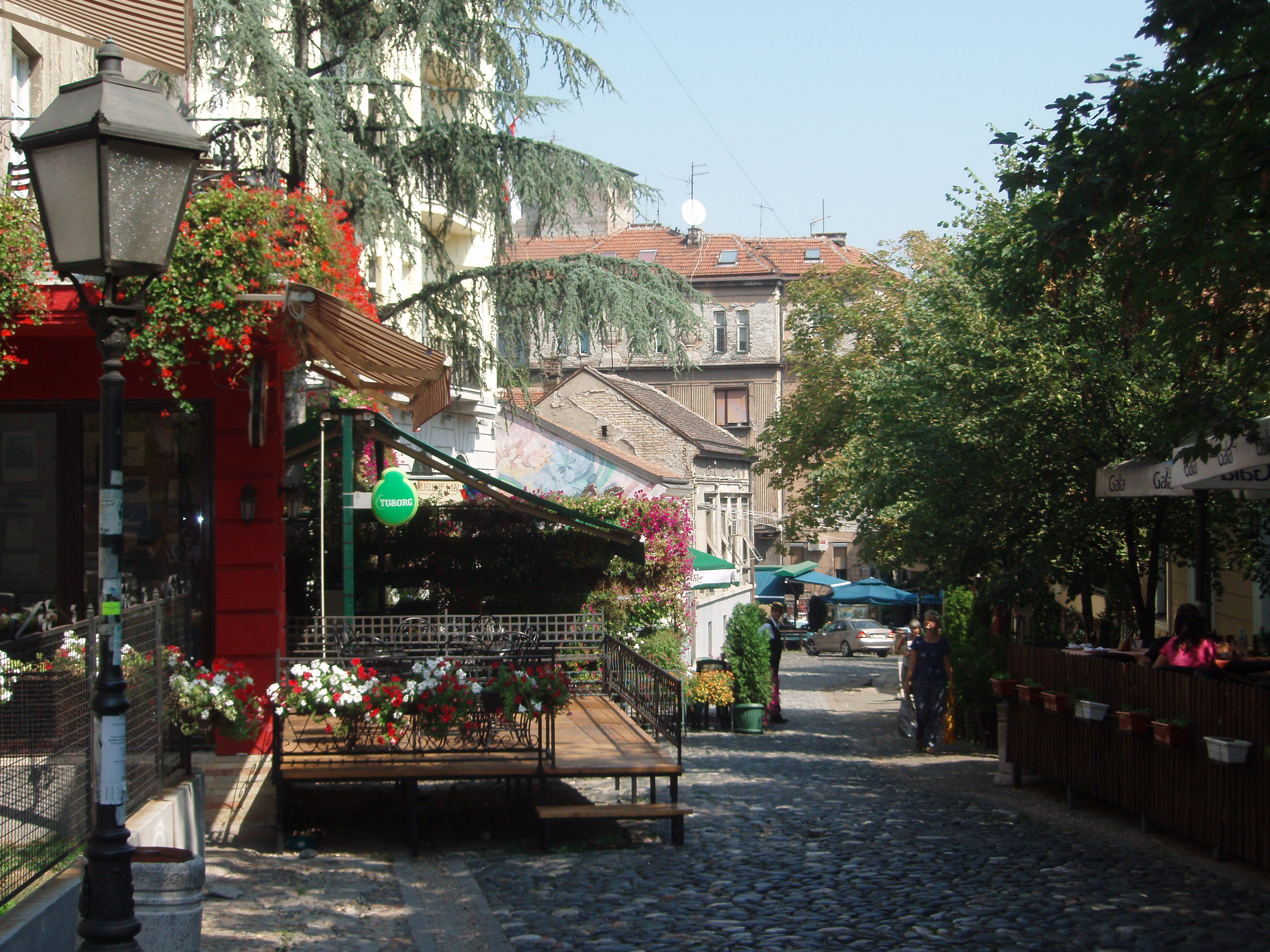
Bohemian quarter of Skadarlija. With its mix of old-style kafanas and modern clubs, it is the second most visited tourist attraction in Belgrade after the Belgrade Fortress

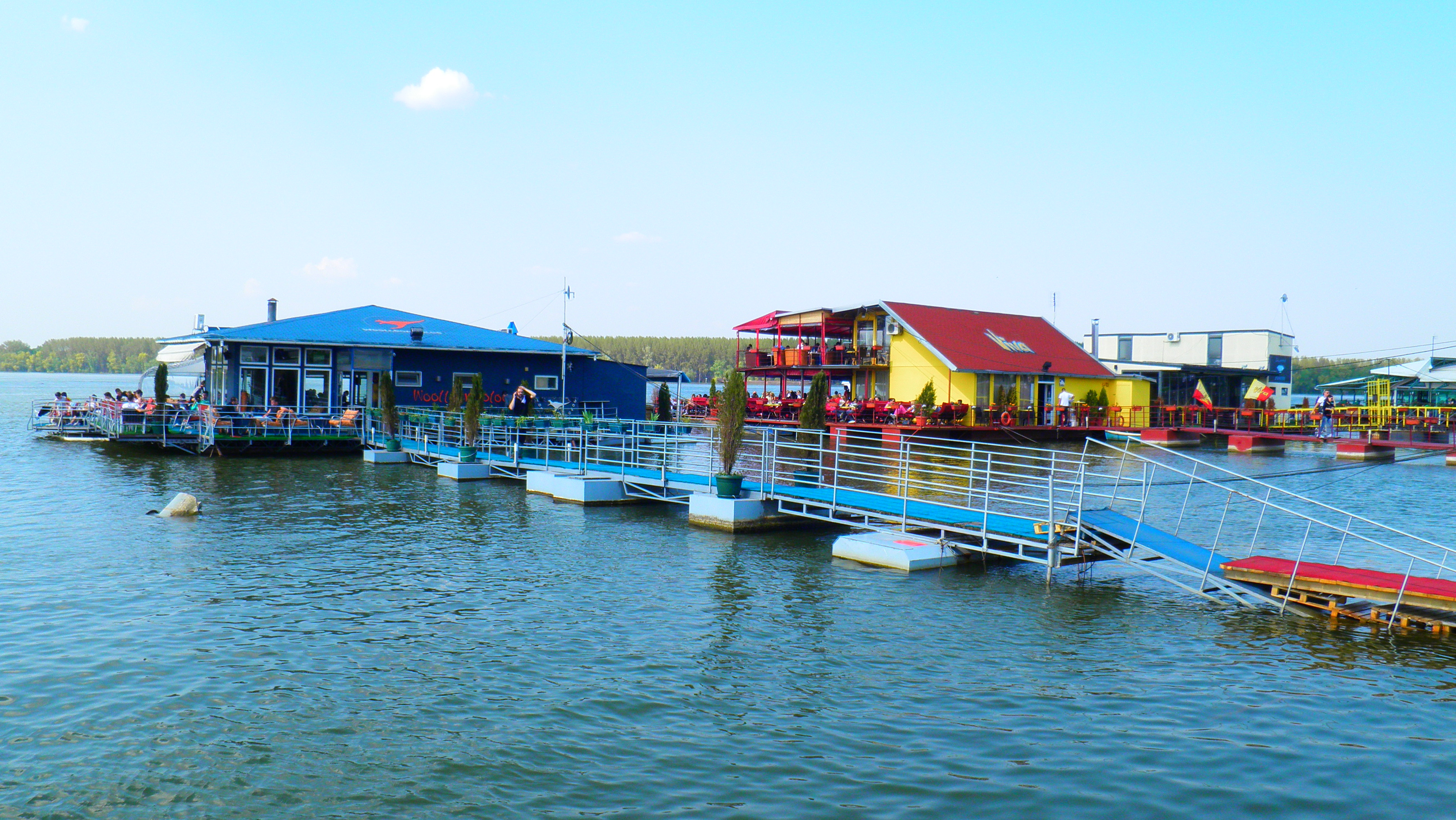
Typical appearance of the splavovi, barges and houseboats adapted into the kafanas, restaurants, clubs and cafés, central venues of the modern city nightlife

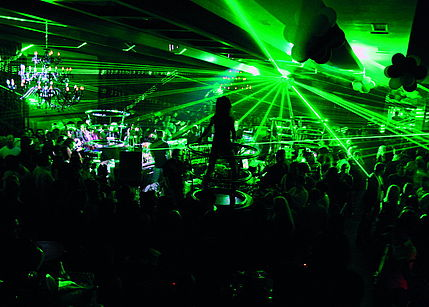
One of the clubs on the splavovi at night (2011)

The vibrant and dynamic nightlife in Belgrade achieved international prominence in the early 21st century. Belgrade, the capital of Serbia, gained a reputation both due to the traditional nightlife, mostly represented by the kafanas, and the contemporary, modern nightlife, especially including splavovi, barges and floats adapted into the clubs and cafés. Belgrade often makes the lists of the cities with best clubbing and partying, discreetly shaping itself into the fun and accommodating metropolis.

The splavovi (singular splav) are located along both banks of the Sava, with numerous clubs along the shores of Ada Ciganlija, and the right bank of the Danube. Despite the modern nightlife developed in time into various varieties to appeal to the foreign visitors and younger demographics, Skadarlija, a Bohemian quarter with traditional kafanas still remains one of the most visited Belgrade attractions, second only to the Belgrade Fortress.

The city is especially popular in the surrounding region, with numerous weekend-visitors. The main appeals to the tourists include: generally good knowledge of foreign languages or lack of language barrier in the case of the former Yugoslavia; friendly atmosphere; abundant number of venues (bars, clubs, cafés, kafanas, restaurants); quality cuisine; relatively low prices of the alcohol, especially from the perspective of foreign visitors; lack of the nightlife regulations or the poor enforcement of the existing ones.

The growing popularity of Belgrade as fun and entertainment hotspot, especially the "crazy splavovi", garnered criticism in time. Though still described as having the "legacy as an intellectual hangout", and including the successful artistic revitalization of quarters like Savamala or Dorćol, the prevailing image of Belgrade, even officially advertised as such, is that of a city of cheap fun. This typecast promotion made Belgrade's nightlife a focal point for the people searching for low-priced hedonistic, carefree distraction, having a much wider social impact: heavy drinking, drug abuse, crime, prostitution, influence on teenagers and youth and a development of the "reality TV shows influenced splavovi-culture".

== Traditional nightlife ==
=== Origins ===
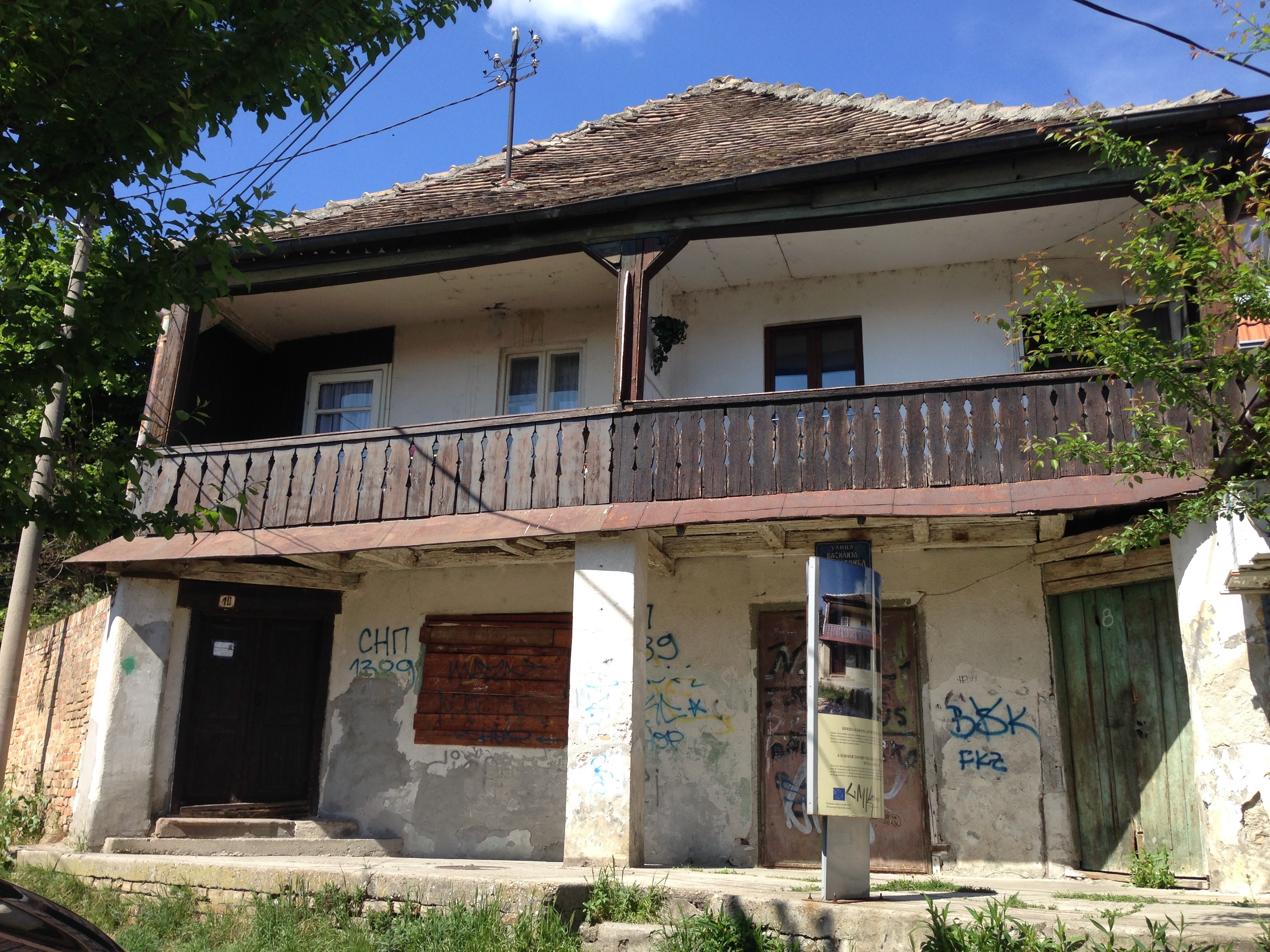
White Bear Tavern in 2017. The venue provided hospitality and catering services for over 300 years (1650s–1960s)

Predecessors of modern nightlife were the kafanas, oriental style bistros. The very first one in Belgrade was opened during the Ottoman period, in 1522, in Dorćol. Believed to be the oldest such venue in Europe, it served only Turkish coffee. This was only a year after the Ottoman conquest of Belgrade, and 33 years before the first kafana was opened in Istanbul in 1555. There are no historical sources to why Belgrade was so important at the time to have such venue so early. Ottoman traveler Evliya Çelebi visited Belgrade in 1661 and counted 21 khans and 6 caravanserais. The largest, Caravanserai of Sokollu Mehmed Pasha had "160 chimneys", and some had harem sections. When Austrians conquered Belgrade in 1718, among other reports to the imperial court in Vienna, they sent a report on kafanas naming them: "Crni orao", "Crveni petao", "Pet ševa", "Tri zeca", "Divlji čovek", etc. They especially addressed the problematic "Kod dve bule", notorious favorite place of the "debauched" Baron Franz von der Trenck.

Belgrade remained rich in kafanas in this period as there were almost 200 kafanas and meyhanas, so production of alcoholic beverages in the city bloomed to meet the demand. Austrian governor, Charles Alexander, Duke of Württemberg, was known for his love of the night life. He abolished all taxes on drink serving, and business blossomed. There were some 140 kafanas and pubs in the German section of the city, and over 200 in the Serbian sector. The former mostly served beer, and the latter wine and rakia. In the 1717-1723 period, four breweries were opened in Belgrade. Duke also organized balls in his palace. In the periods when the balls were organized, music in other parts of the city was forbidden. Common citizens were sometimes forcefully dragged to the balls. where they had to pay the entry fee of 17 kreuzers, which was too high. The aristocracy mostly used the commoners as a laughingstock at the balls, and those who refused to come or made problems at the balls, were jailed and whipped. A massive, lush dinners and feasts, known as traktacije, were organized. They included meals out of reach for the common people, like caviar, octopuses, salted herrings, fried pigeons, hot chocolate or imported wines. After the return of the Ottomans in 1739, this "baroque blitz" of Belgrade's nightlife ended.

After the recapturing, at the corner of the modern Kralja Petra and Cara Dušana streets, kafana "Crni orao", the first such facility with the recorded word kafana in its name, survived. It served coffee and nargile. The object was also important for other reasons. It was also the first brewery in Belgrade, and the first venue to work 24/7. On the floor above dwelled guardsmen, the crew of the fortress' Timișoara Gate. As their duty was 24/7, so were the kafana's working hours. The building survived until the Interbellum.

White Bear Tavern was opened in the 18th century in the town of Zemun. The building was constructed in the first half of the 17th century and served as caravanserai (khan) at least since 1658. Popular venue stayed in business until the early 1960s. It is the oldest surviving building in urban Belgrade, beside the Belgrade Fortress walls. However, Zemun developed independently from Belgrade and for the most part during history two towns belonged to two different states. Zemun became part of the same administrative unit as Belgrade on 4 October 1929, lost a separate town status to Belgrade in 1934 and made a continuous built-up area with Belgrade only since the 1950s. Hence, the House at 10 Cara Dušana Street in Dorćol is usually named as the oldest house in Belgrade, while the White Bear Tavern is titled as the oldest house in Zemun.

The word kafana, introduced by the Ottomans (qahve hane), was derived from the Persian qahvah–khanah, meaning "coffee house". English version appeared for the first time in 1615, published by George Sandys after his travels to Constantinople.

=== Golden age ===
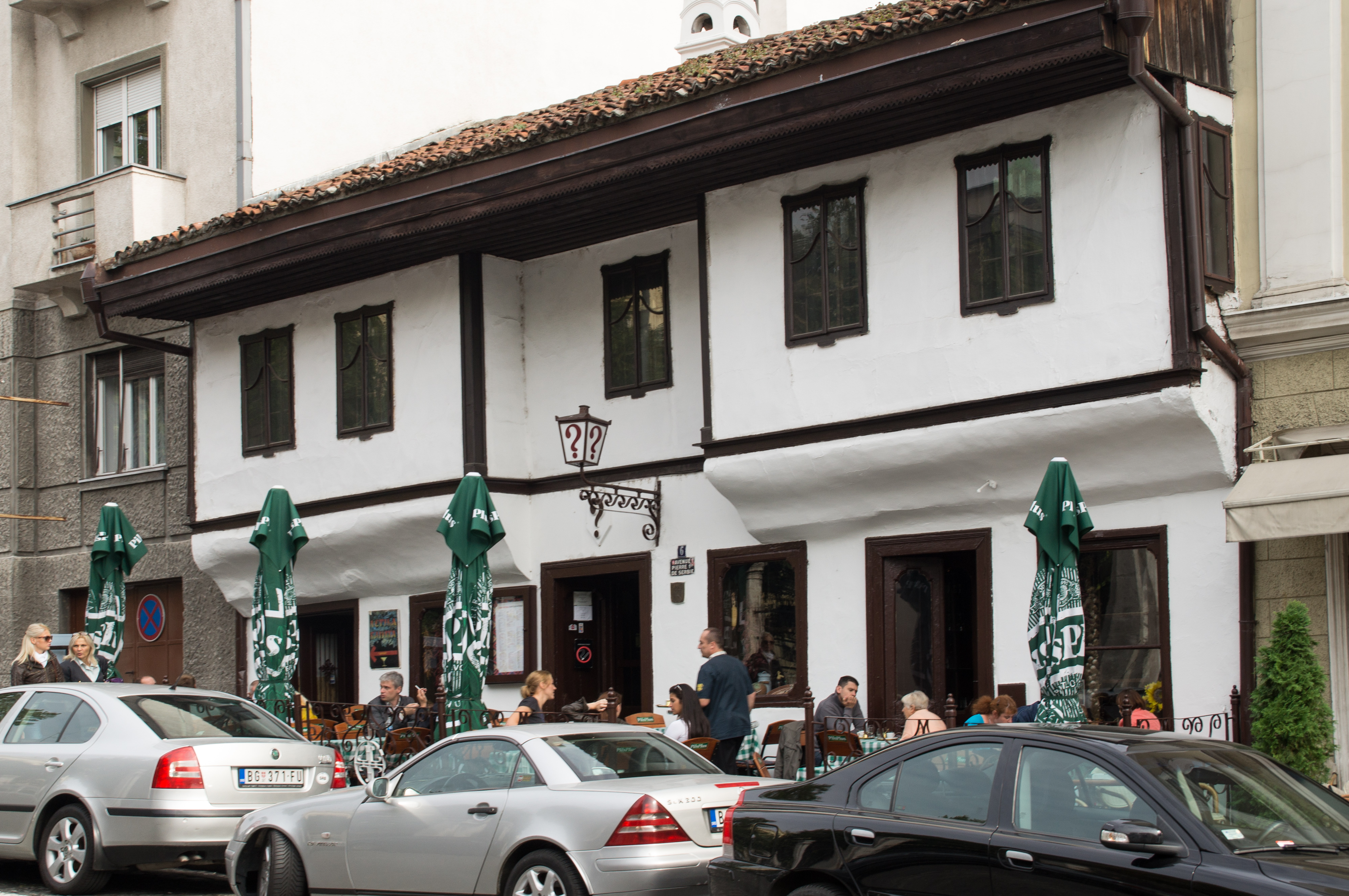
Kafana ?, opened in 1823, the oldest still operational kafana in Belgrade

Prince Alexander Karađorđević codified hospitality objects in 1847, dividing them into mehanas and khans, with former given the rank of craft shops. For a long time venues remained unchanged: clothless tables, loosen chairs and benches, tinplate furnaces fired by the guests themselves, tallow candles or petroleum lamps light. A culture of spending hours in kafanas developed among the lower classes. They discussed daily events, politics, shared funny stories or sang with gusle. But development of westernized venues began, built after the examples in Vienna or Budapest. They became gathering spots for officers, clerks, landowners, and, unlike traditional kafanas, occasionally they had women guests. Princess Ljubica Obrenović was a regular visitor of the fancy "Manojlova bašta", in modern Zeleni Venac, where she was having a beer. It was the first Belgrade's kafana to serve beer, starting in 1835. In time, the crumby-type kafanas mostly remained in suburbia.

Staying up late was against the law, but people would regularly stay in kafanas after-hours. As Belgrade had no street lights at the time, the mayor Nikola Hristić ordered that every person walking at night must have individual, personal lamp, stipulating high fines. As people coming from the venues at late hours were already breaking the law, they had no lamps, trying to stay unnoticed by the gendarmes. A subculture of bribery developed as for the offenders, when caught, it was less expensive to pay the gendarme than to pay the fine, while the gendarmes were poorly paid anyway.

Kafanas became centers of city's social life, as the entire political and cultural pulse of the city radiated from them. Some historians described them as the "most important institutions" from the 19th century to World War II. Prince Mihailo Obrenović also codified them in 1863, and ordered that women were not allowed to own the kafana nor to work in the village and road ones, but one, or exceptionally two, could work in city kafanas. The venues diversified into various types: mehana, bistro, gostionica, han, saraj, lokal, krčma, bircuz, birtija and later also restoran, hotel, etc. Though all of them offered drinks, some were also offering food, rest and sleepover. Also, many had music. At the end of the 19th century, downtown Makedonska Street had 40 houses, of which 22 were kafanas. Kafanas were generally diversified: some served only coffee, other served only beer or offered only bean soup. Another codification, this time by the municipality, followed in 1877. Kafanas were categorized - kafanas of the first order were allowed to have one female waitress.

As hubs of the social life, kafanas soon diversified: "Esnafska kafana" (for craftsmen - bricklayers, masons, well diggers, carpenters, sawyers), "Makedonija" (farmers and traders), "Kod Albanije" (leaseholders), etc. Depending on the political affiliation of the guests, some kafanas turned into the debate clubs of the Serbian Progressive Party, People's Radical Party or Liberal Party. "Rajić" was the first kafana where modern ćevapčići were prepared c.1860. Staple of the Serbian cuisine today, they were so popular that at one moment there were 300 ćevabdžinicas (ćevapčići grill shops) in Belgrade. Fully named "Kod Rajića junaka serbskog", it hosted the festivities after the complete withdrawal of the Ottomans from Belgrade in 1867, organized by the prince Mihailo.

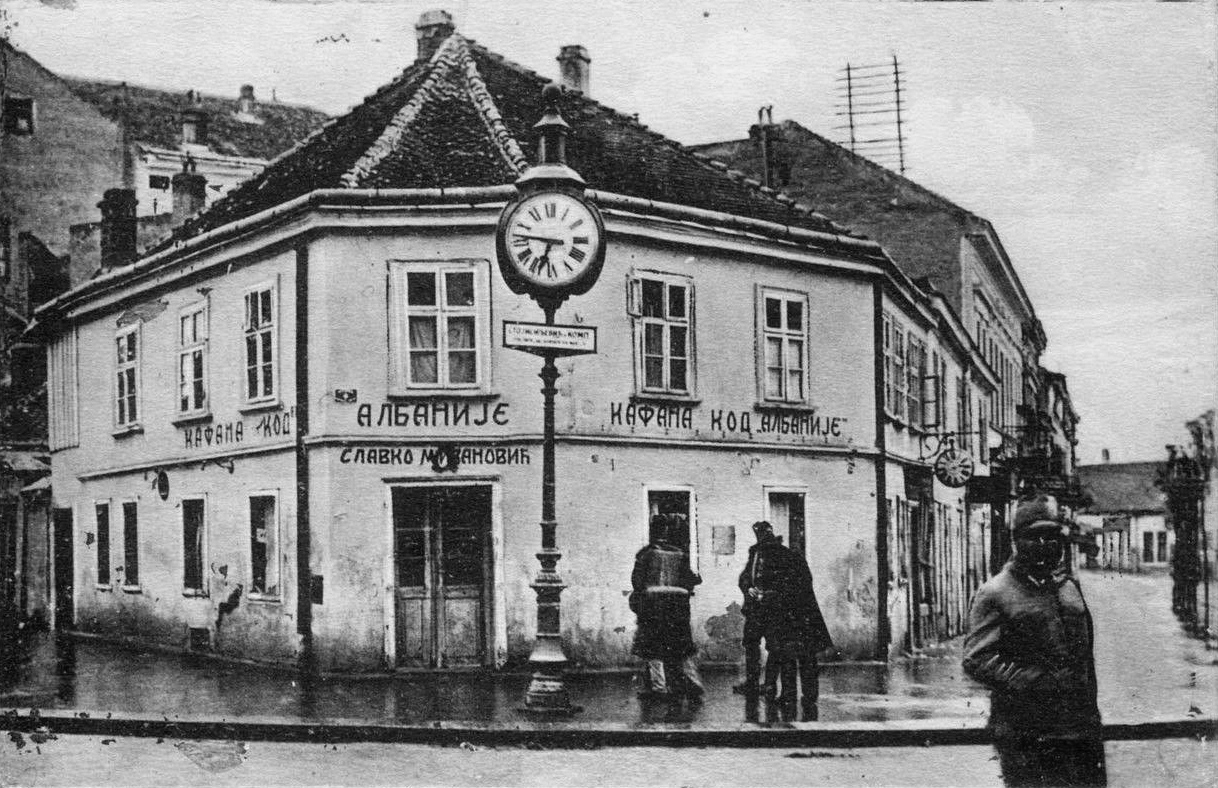
Kafana "Kod Albanije", with the first public clock in Belgrade. Today location of the Palace Albanija

The first hotel, "Kod jelena", was built in 1843 but became known as "Staro zdanje". It introduced European tradition in entertainment and had the first ballroom in Belgrade. The first ball in Belgrade was held in 1838. They became more frequent after 1860 and had a strict timetable and etiquette. Opposed to this, the vogue of so-called "potato balls" spread among the lower classes, especially in the suburban kafanas. They were named that way as, opposed to the distinguished dances of the rich, at these dance party surrogates people were just jumping and jerking, as if they were kicking potato sacks.

The first kafana which allowed guests to stay the entire night "?", since the mid-19th century, originally only twice a year, after the Christmas and Easter liturgies. Located across the Belgrade's Cathedral Church, it allowed the believers who remained long into the night in the churchyard to stay inside the kafana. On 6 February 1893 the first electrified streetlamp was lit in the city and some chroniclers accept this as the moment when "proper night life" began.

In 1860 one of the best known kafanas, "Kod Albanije", was opened. A modern Palace Albania was built in 1940 on its location. Some of the venues had jovial names, like "Kod pocepanih gaća" [Chez Torn Nickers] and "Sedam Švaba" [Seven Swabians], or were named after the edifices they were close to ("Tri šešira" [Three Hats], because of the Dimović's hat store which occupied the house before and had three tin-made hats above the entrance; "Kod palidrvca" [Chez Matchstick], because of the nearby match factory). Kafana "Amerika" was known for Turkish delight, chickpeas and čočeks, but also for introducing belly dancers and was notorious for prostitution. Hotel and restaurant "Balkan" on Terazije was built in 1935 on the location of the former "Simina kafana" from 1860. Ranked as the highest category 1, it was a meeting place of the businesspeople, and was one of the few here women were allowed to work. "Zlatni krst", also in Terazije, advertised itself in 1862 as having "12 rooms and stable for 30 horses".

A custom of unusual, exotic and funny names continued, often countering some neighboring or well established venue: "Pivni izvor" [Beer Spring], "Bosfor" [Bosporus] (next to "Dardaneli" [Dardanelles]), "Engleska kraljica" [Queen of England], "Zemljotres" [Earthquake], "Crna mačka" [Black Cat] (next to "Bela mačka" [White Cat]), "Žurka" [Party], "Kod tri seljaka" [Chez Three Peasants], "Astronomska kugla" [Astronomy Ball], "Kod bombardovanja Beograda" [Chez Bombing of Belgrade], "Gusarski brod" [Pirate Ship], "Dva panja" [Two Logs], "Jeftinoća" [Cheapness], "Musa Kesedžija", "Radosan Srbin" [Joyful Serb], "Srpski vlakovođa" [Serbian Train Driver], "Crni Arapin" [Black Arab], "U modrim šumama" [In Blue Forests], "Kod dve misterije" [Chez Two Mysteries], "Kod Oroza" [Chez Trigger], "Vrući gavran" [Hot Raven], "Izgubljeno jagnje" [Lost Lamb] or "Kod žirafu vanevropsku zverku" [Chez giraffe, out-of-Europe beast].

One of the most distinguished venues was '"Srpska kruna", built in 1869 and adapted into the hotel. It originated in 1853 at the corner of Knez Mihailova and Pariska streets. It was famous for its balls. Built by prince Alexander Karađorđević, it was sold to the Belgrade administration which moved in. The new building, located across the Kalemegdan Park, today hosts the Belgrade City Library. It was part of the colloquially styled "Kalemegdan group of hotels", due to their location. The venues began to develop after 1867 and full withdrawal of the Ottomans from the city. The group included the "Nacional" inn, later also a hotel, built in 1868. "Srpska kruna" architecturally preserved the appearance of the khan - squared, central inner yard - but in modern style. It had only 12 rooms but was famous for its large ceremonial hall, used for the European-style balls and concerts, though every ball had to start with the Serbian folk kolo Srbijanka.

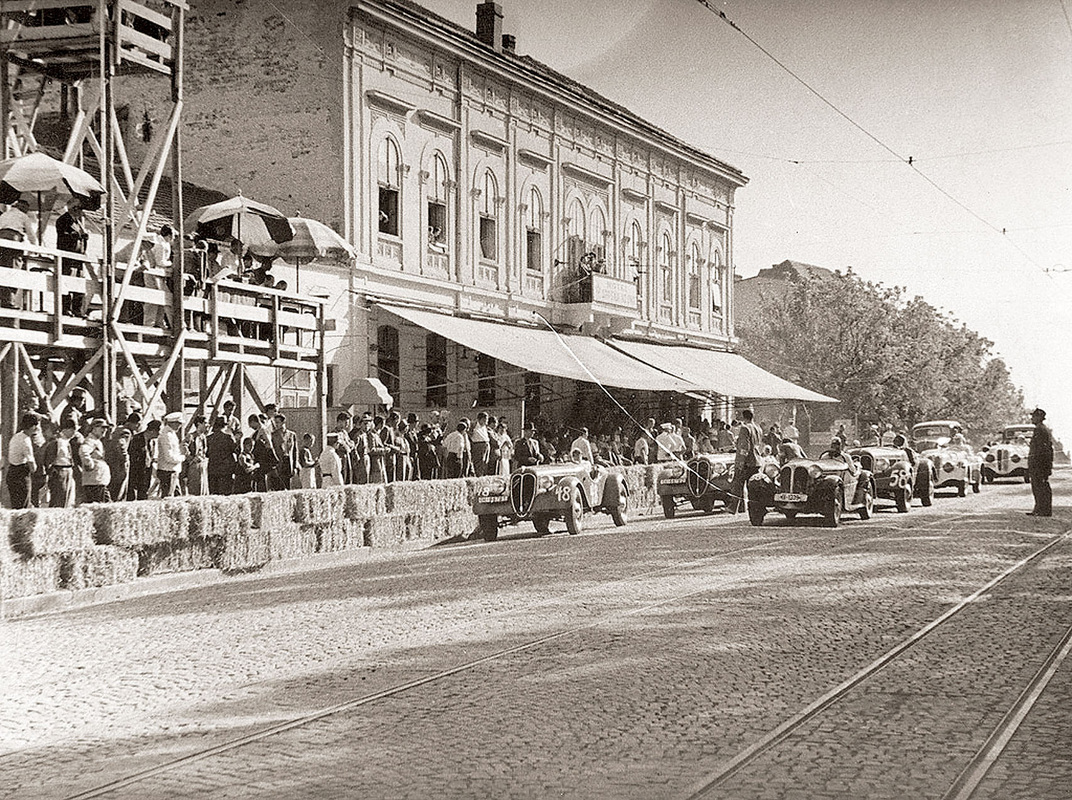
Kafana "Srpska kruna", as the starting point of the 1939 Belgrade Grand Prix race

"Dardaneli" became the most popular kafana after the 1896 reconstruction, a pivot for actors, writers, singing societies, and the central point of city's urban spirit and bohemianism. It was founded in 1855 by Arif Bey, the Turk. Ownership changed a lot, being owned by a Serbian woman Stojana in 1858, as she received it as a dowry. It had billiard tables. Notable regular guests included Vojislav Ilić, Branislav Nušić, Antun Gustav Matoš, Stevan Sremac, Radoje Domanović, Janko Veselinović, Toša Jovanović, Đura Jakšić, and Milovan Glišić. It was affectionately called "people's university". When it was to be closed, regular guests organized "farewell ceremony" - some 70 people gathered, wearing fedoras and top hats, organized by the famous Bohemian actor Čiča Ilija Stanojević, and performed a dignified farewell "with great sadness and sorrow". It was demolished in 1901, a modern National Museum in Belgrade was built instead, so the clientele moved to "Velika Srbija" and the already established kafana hub, Skadarlija. At the time, Belgrade was divided into quarters, and the Bibija stream, flowing down the Skadarlija, was an administrative border between the quarters of Palilula and Dorćol. As Palilula limited music to midnight, people would then jump across the stream in the Dorćol section to continue with festivities.

As "Velika Srbija" itself was soon demolished to make way for the "Hotel Moskva", Skadarlija became the central nightlife point of Belgrade. As of 2023, "Tri šešira", founded in 1864, is the oldest, still operational kafana in Skadarlija and second overall in Belgrade, after the "?" from 1823. Even older "Gospodarska Mehana", from 1820, was closed in 2013. It was situated close to the mouth of the Topčiderka into the Sava. One of the oldest, "Grčka Kraljica", was opened in 1835 and closed in 2007.

"Despotov Han" inn, predecessor of "Grčka Kraljica", holds the infamy as the first recorded brothel in Belgrade, dating from the 1840s. As the prostitution was always illegal, the sex workers had to move to the streets, while the venue continued as regular kafana. The last "officially unofficial" brothel from this period was located in the ground-floor house in the Čika Ljubina Street, behind the modern Instituto Cervantes building. The house was demolished much later, in the early 1990s. Prostitution was largely suppressed by the actions of the Circle of Serbian Sisters, founded in 1903.

At the turn of the 19th and the 20th century, Belgrade had one hospitality or catering venue per 50 inhabitants. After World War I, new venues were completely westernized. New hotels, with popular restaurants, were "Splendid", "Astorija", "Union", "Luksor", "Palace", etc. The social divide remained, though. Members of the lower classes couldn't afford fancy venues, like hotels "Slavija" or "Imperijal", to order Wiener schnitzel or Hungarian goulash, to listen to German or French singers or to watch magicians, jugglers and other artists. They were visiting small cookshops, soup kitchens and lowest quality venues. Among the most luxurious and exclusive nightlife locales during the Interbellum was "Srpski Kralj", at the corner of Uzun-Mirkova and Pariska streets. The lavish hotel was described as an "ornament" of the city, with "equally beautiful interior and exterior". It was completely destroyed during the German bombing of Belgrade on 6 April 1941. After the war, the state nationalized the lot. Despite several initiatives, it was never rebuilt. Instead, restaurant "Park" was opened, with majority of the lot becoming restaurant's garden. It was later renamed to "Central Park", before it burned to the ground in December 2012.

On 30 December 1927, Ministry of Finance of the Kingdom of the Serbs, Croats and Slovenes banned night life after 23:00: those who loiter and sit till the late hours, and it is past eleven, will be fined two dinars. Known as the "tax for nighttime sitting", it is considered the first official ban of night life in Serbia.

Other important, now closed kafanas from this period included:

- "Babuna"; in Senjak, across the modern Belgrade Fair, hosted the monument Pobednik, one of the most recognizable symbols of Belgrade today, before it was erected on the Belgrade Fortress.
- "Bajlonijeva kafana"; in Skadarlija, owned by the Czech émigré Ignjat Bajloni, right next to his brewery so the air in kafana had the fresh hops aroma. Large venue was known for its beer: dark, light, golden, but also pre-World War II famous foreign brands, like Gambrinus or Stout. Beer was served only in kegs and the venue was famous for its grilled meat. After 1907, it hosted the concerts of the Abrašević Choir, which was founded in 1905.
- "Boem"; in Cetinjska Street, close to Skadarlija. Very popular during Interbellum, with specific music: schlagers, serenades and arias from operas and operettas.
- "Bulevar"; in Terazije. The first electrified streetlight in Belgrade was lit in front of it on 6 February 1893. It was popular because of the large hall where parties were organized, including regular concerts of the Serbian-Jewish Singing Society, first fencing tournament in Serbia, shows of the German theatrical groups from Berlin (over 100 shows in 1904 only) and rallies of the political parties. The hall was adapted into the first opera scene in 1909 and the performances were set in collaboration of Branislav Nušić and opera singer Žarko Savić from Zemun. Critics didn't like it, so the scene was closed in 1911. It was still renamed to "Opera" later, and was a seat of the comedy-vaudeville theatre "Orfeum".
- "Bums Keler"; in Skadarlija, at the corner with Zetska Street. Until World War I praised as one of the top kafanas in town, with nicely arranged garden, good snacks and excellent wine. Actor Dobrica Milutinović and writer Branislav Nušić for a while lived above the kafana, while actors and singers performed at the venue. The owner was Pera Bums.
- "Cvetkova mehana"; Cvetko Jovanović opened it in 1902, on the Smederevo road, across the Mali Mokri Lug's farmers' market. Originally named "Vračarsko polje" after the location, it became known as "Cvetkova mehana". The market, and then the neighborhood were named after it, today shortened to only Cvetko.
- "Čukareva kafana"; existed in the later 19th century at the present location of the Sugar Refinery. A popular venue at the crossroad of the Obrenovac and Šumadija roads, at the entrance into the city, it was named after its owner, Stojko Čukar. It gave name to the modern neighborhood and municipality Čukarica.
- "Dva bela goluba"; founded by Jovan Kujundžić, a tailor (terzija, cloth tailor). Originally a typical road meyhane, it became so famous that the entire neighborhood and the modern Svetogorska Street were named after it in 1872. In the late 1920s, the Artisan Guild purchased the house and the surrounding lot in order to build the Home of the Artisans, which is today the building of the Radio Belgrade. Kujundžić had one condition, that the name is to be preserved. Because of that, above the entrance into the building, the sculptural composition was carved. It shows two persons with an anvil (symbol of artisans), next to the anvil are scissors (symbol of tailors), with two white doves. The kafana moved to Skadarlija while the restaurant in the new building (finished in 1933) was named "Zanatski dom".
- "Dva duda"; visited by Belgrade's coachmen and porters. It was located close to Tašmajdan.
- "Era Gurman"; at modern 6 Nikola Pašić Square, where the building of Belgrade City administration is today. Considered having the best grilled and roasted meat in town.
- "Građanska kasina"; at the corner of Kralja Petra and Knez Mihailova streets. The clientele included the most respected and educated Belgrade merchants, high-ranking officers and clerks. Red Cross of Serbia was founded here in 1876, so as Serbian Journalists Association in 1881 and Belgrade Stock Exchange in 1894.
- "Kazbek"; the most famous "Russian" kafana, established after the massive Russian White emigration. Opened in November 1931 by Ruben Rotinov, it was a venue on "European level" and labeled a center of Belgrade's nightlife. It hosted Russian entertainers and singers from all over the world. Originally located at the entry into Skadarlija, it later moved to the main, Kralja Milana Street, where modern "Polet" restaurant is.
- "London"; which gave name to the modern surrounding neighborhood, at the crossroads of the Kneza Miloša and Kralja Milana streets. Built between 1865 and 1873, with hotel rooms above it, kafana's original clientele were the deputies of the nearby National Assembly. Belgrade's first korzo (promenade), formed next to it and down the Topčider Road (today Kneza Miloša). New building was constructed in 1962, but the modernized kafana survived until 1992, joined by the disco-club of the same name in the 1980s. Since 1992 it has been adapted into the branch of the Ponzi scheme of Dafiment Bank, casino, wine club and a supermarket, which all kept the name London.
- "Malo Pristanište"; small kafana in Savamala. Before World War II, it was the starting point for the boat transport to the other side of the river, and the Nica Beach.

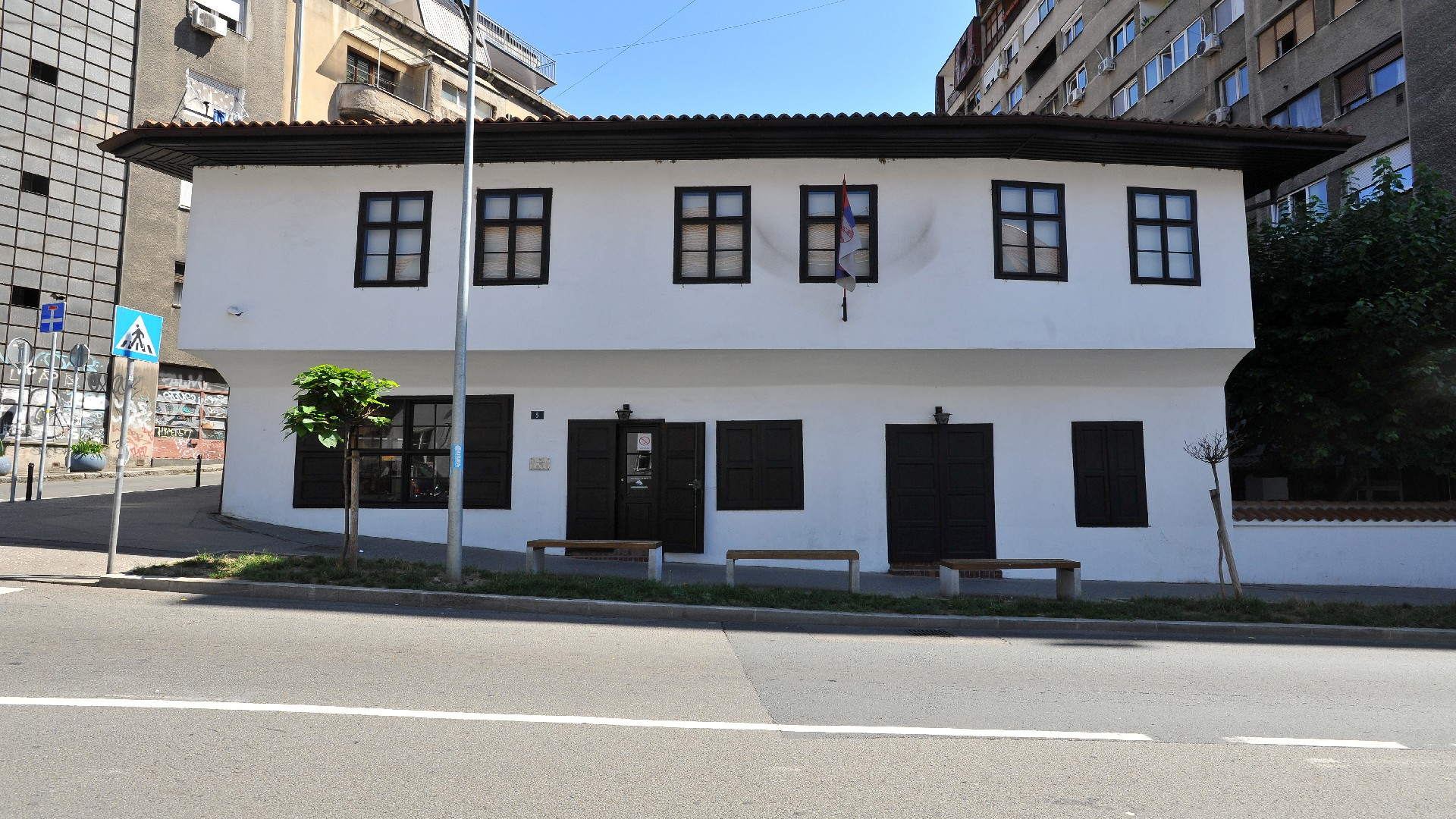
Manak's House, built in 1830, hosted meyhane in the 19th century. The house survived as one of the rare edifices from that period in Belgrade and is protected by the state

- "Manakova kuća"; in the Bosanska (now 7 Gavrila Principa) Street in Savamala. The house was built for the local Turkish agha and his harem. Cincar merchant Manojlo Manak acquired the house and opened the meyhane and bakery on the ground floor, while he lived upstairs. His cousin Manak Mihailović inherited the house and named the venue after his first name. In the early 20th century he brought a Czech capella, the first all-female music orchestra in Belgrade. The meyhane was closed, but the house survived, was protected by the state in 1963 and declared a cultural monument of great value in 1979.
- "Mostar"; originally "Tri ključa", it was named after the small bridge (most) across the Mokroluški potok, which emptied into the Sava nearby. The wooden bridge was regularly destroyed during the seasonal floods. Kafana gave its name to the modern Mostar neighborhood and the large interchange.
- "Novi Beograd"; opened in 1924 by Petar Kokotović in the informal suburban settlement of Tošin Bunar. The name was prophetic as the modern municipality New Belgrade was named that way in 1948.
- "Nica"; located on the sandy beach across the Sava, in the modern Ušće in New Belgrade. It was one of the favorite vacation spots during Interbellum. People were transported from the city by the small boats. Originally only one in the entire string of kafanas along the unurbanized bank ("Ostend", "Zdravlje", "Abadžija", "Jadran", "Krf", "Dubrovnik", "Adrija", etc.), it was the only one that survived construction of the King Alexander Bridge in the early 1930s. The beach was to be demolished, too, but it also survived the construction of the bridge, which only made access easier. By this time, it became the largest city beach and was named "Nica", after the kafana. The beach was finally closed in 1938 when the construction of the embankment began.
- "Pariz"; originally "Ćosina kafana", founded in the 1830s by Anđelko Alekić Ćosa, who began construction of the new building in 1868. Hotel and kafana were finished in 1870. It was situated between "Kasina" and "Takovo". Location of the first Serbian comedy theatre "Orfeum". First Serbian feature film The Life and Deeds of the Immortal Leader Karađorđe, was partially filmed in the venue, and later shown in it. It was demolished during the reconstruction of Terazije in 1948.
- "Pozorišna kafana"; opened in 1902 as "Pozorišna kasina", after the demolition of "Dardaneli", taking over as the favorite choice of actors, bohemians and other artists. Actors and journalists' associations were founded in it.
- "Rudničanin"; at the corner of Beogradska and Kralja Milana streets, on the location of modern Mitićeva Rupa. In decades prior to the opening of the Belgrade Main railway station in 1884, the venue was known as the major transloading and packaging spot in Belgrade. In its vast yard, which also included stables and quarters for merchants and bullwhackers, the goods and food arriving from the interior were stored and repackaged for the city markets. It survived until the 1920s.
- "Sablja Dimiskija", or simply "Dimiskija"; was the largest kafana at the starting point of Bulevar Kralja Aleksandra. It had an outdoor sitting area where well known athletes and local rascals gathered. Later moved to Džordža Vašingtona Street.
- "Slavija"; original hotel and kafana were built from 1882 to 1888. It had a big party hall and a spacious summer garden. It hosted recitals, theatrical shows and choirs performances.
- "Šiškova kafana"; one of the oldest kafanas in Belgrade. It was located across the Iguman's Palace in Terazije and was a favorite place of the Liberals. It was later replaced with the "Beograd" cinema.
- "Takovo"; one of Terazije's kafanas, it was frequently visited by the actors. One of the regulars was a composer Stevan Mokranjac. It had a good reputation among the city gentlemen, who often visited for "intimate luncheons".
- "Topola"; it was located at the central part of the modern Nikola Pašić Square and popular among the lawyers, who visited with their clients to write claims and complaints. In front of it, the first gas station in Belgrade was opened in 1926.
- "Zeleni Venac"; at former 1 Gospodska Street. One of the first houses built in the neighborhood, it was rented by Mrs. Hermann from Saxony, young hatmaker's widow. The couple migrated to Belgrade but after her husband's death, she decided to quit the hat making business, rented the house and turned it into the kafana. The venue had no name, but a tin-made green wreath (zeleni venac in Serbian) hanging on the façade. Mrs. Hermann picked the wreath as the kafana faced the cemetery at the time. She established the venue around 1840 and operated it with her daughters. During Interbellum, the name Zeleni Venac spread to the entire neighborhood. Kafana was demolished in the 1960s.
- "Zlatna lađa"; was built by wealthy merchant Miša Anastasijević. In business until the World War I, it was a meeting place of the merchants and prominent people during the reign of Prince Miloš.
- "Zlatni krst"; in Terazije, where the first cinema show in Belgrade was held in June 1896. For 25 days, representatives of the "Brothers Lumiere" were showing "photographs made alive by the cinematograph": L'Arrivée d'un train en gare de La Ciotat, Démolition d'un mur, Baignade en mer, and others. The premiere was attended by king Alexander Obrenović and queen mother Natalie. Prior to that, after the Serbian-Turkish wars from 1876 to 1878, it was the favorite place of the politicians, both liberal and conservative ones. In 1909 the venue moved to Skadarlija and later another kafana, "Dušanov Grad", was opened instead on Terazije. By the 21st century, it was turned into the gambling venue.
- "Zlatni šaran"; located in Jalija, lower section of Dorćol. Close to the Danube, it was well known for its fish meals, and especially famous for its fish broth. Famous mathematician Mihailo Petrović, also known as a passionate fisherman, performed in the venue with his musical group "Suz" in the late 19th century.
- "Župa"; at the curve of the Avala road in Jajinci. Location of the first modern traffic sign placed in Belgrade, the first concrete paved street, and a pitstop in the first races organized in Belgrade. In 2018, a street in the vicinity of its former location was named after the kafana.

==== Zemun ====
As Zemun was a border town between Austria(-Hungary) and Turkey/Serbia, from 1730 to 1871 there was Kontumac, or the quarantine hospital, on the location of the modern City Park. As Zemun was an important trading post, Kontumac was also a duty-free zone. It contained residential quarters during stay in the zone. Having large number of people in one place, hospitality and catering services developed around the zone, and numerous kafanas were opened: "Kod zlatnog krsta", "Kod zlatnog točka", "Kod cara", "Kod zlatnog slona", "Kod zlatnog sunca", etc.

=== Modern period ===
After World War II, night life dwindled. City was heavily damaged, population was cut by half, and it took a while to establish a proper public transportation grid to allow the commuting. Apart from the surviving "legends", new kafanas which became centers of night life in the 1950s-1960s were adjoined to the sports clubs and stadiums, like "Mladi Proleter", "Sinđelić", "Obilić" or "Stadion". Clientele often included footballers and other athletes. Another hub of night life included riverbank kafanas held by the fishermen, especially in Zemun. Popular entertainment and technological progress also hampered the importance of kafanas. Radio Belgrade began airing non-stop, including immensely popular comedy shows which emptied the streets, like the Joyful Evening (Veselo veče). In 1958 the broadcast of the Television Belgrade began.

In the mid-1950s, renovated "Lotos Bar" was opened in Zmaj Jovina Street. A basement venue, it offered "artistic program" which included magicians, unicycle drivers, jugglers, fire eaters and, as the main attraction, barely dressed female dancers. It became instant sensation. As members of the new Communists political establishment became regular visitors and the bar slipped from not-so-hidden striptease club into the, also not-so-hidden prostitution locale, the working hours were constantly extended. In order to repeal the common people, the entry prices, and especially drinks, skyrocketed. Similar venues soon followed: "Kristal Bar", bars in the "Mažestik" and "Metropol" hotels, and numerous striptease clubs in the 1990s. By the early 2000s, all were closed.

The street prostitution developed since the late 1960s. The sex workers operated on the access roads to the Pančevo Bridge and became known as stoperke ("hitchhiker girls"). As a result, a row of inns was built along the Pančevo and Zrenjanin roads. Another long surviving location was the Economy Faculty's Park, where gay and transsexual prostitution also developed. The park earned a moniker Picin park [Pussy Park], while the prostitutes were nicknamed kamenjarke ("stone walkers") after the nearby Kamenička Street. Transgender sex worker Vjeran Miladinović Merlinka became a celebrity in the 1990s. Another location, which in time became synonymous for prostitution was Plavi most ("Blue Bridge") across the highway between Konjarnik and Medaković. Old style brothels also continued, followed in the 1990s by the porn-shops and business escort agencies, some located even in Skadarlija. Since the 2010s, some elite prostitutes became reality TV stars, called "starlets", though they were continuously getting arrested for prostitution.

New Belgrade, built across the Sava in earnest from 1948, notoriously had no night life, as for the long time it had no kafanas. Exceptions were "Fontana" in the neighborhood of the same name, "Pri Majolka", later renamed "Vojvodina", in the shopping mall "Old Merkator", and the oldest "Džakarta", across the Studentski Grad, better known by its original and present name "Tošin Bunar".

As the first kafana on the boat, "Split" has historical importance as the precursor of splavovi. The restaurant was opened in 1970, but the ship was much older. On the orders of the Serbian Royal Navy Society, it was built in 1892 in Regensburg, Germany, as the luxurious paddle steamer, and originally named Emperor Nicholas II. It was sent mostly on diplomatic missions, like International Danube Commission. It was part of the ill-fated Kladovo transport in World War II. After the war it was renamed Split, docked under the Branko's Bridge, and adapted into the restaurant. The steerage was adapted into the private rooms and used for prostitution, so the police often raided the venue. The ship is since 1992 on the dry dock in Kladovo, being declared a cultural monument in 2006.

In time kafanas evolved into the westernized restaurants, but many traditional ones survived, and remained part of Belgrade's tourist offer. Even today kafanas have been described as the "soul of Belgrade". Despite the development of the nightlife in modern sense in the 1960s, and diversification of the fun venues and their modernization to fit the younger population and foreign tourists, in the 2020s Skadarlija remains the second most visited attraction in Belgrade after the Belgrade Fortress, contributing to one third of the city's foreign currency income.

==== Skadarlija ====
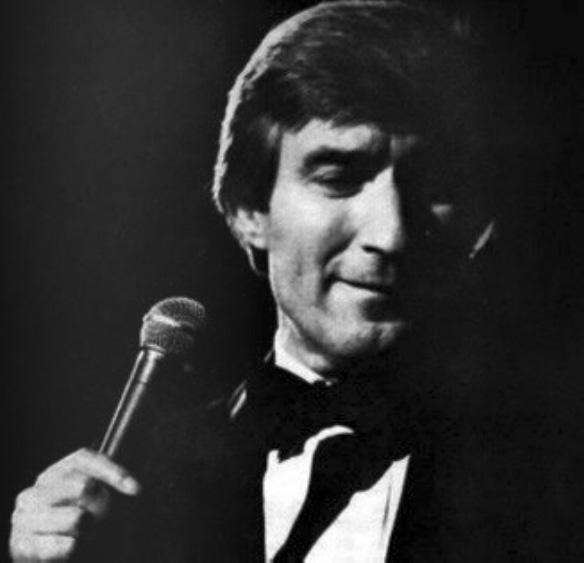
Toma Zdravković (1938–1991), folk chansonnier, one of the most popular Serbian singer-songwriters, and a longtime performer in Skadarlija. Known for his personal bohemian lifestyle, he remained extremely popular with younger generations and his songs endured as the inevitable part of traditional nightlife

Skadarlija partially preserved the ambience of the traditional urban architecture, including its archaic urban organization, and is known as the main bohemian quarter of Belgrade, similar to Paris' Montmartre. As similar Bohemian quarters, Skadarlija and Montmartre twinned on 22 October 1977. It began to develop in 1830 with the settlement of Gypsies in the abandoned trenches in front of the ramparts, followed by the Serbs and the Turks after 1835. An aqueduct, essentially a wall through the center of the street, was later constructed to conduct the stream of Bibijin Potok underground. The largest arch of the aqueduct was named Skadar, so in 1872 the street was named Skadarska Street.

Soon after the aqueduct was built, the first khans, precursors of later kafanas, were built along the foothill of the wall. Skadarlija began to acquire its bohemian character in the last few decades of the 19th century, and particularly after 1901 and demolition of "Dardaneli". In the early 20the century there were 15 kafanas in Skadarlija, including: "Tri šešira", "Dva jelena", "Zlatni bokal", "Bandist", "East", "Guild", "Vuk Karadžić", "Bums Keler", "Miloš Obilić", "The Two Sergeants" and "Mala Pijaca". The first three still exist, accompanied by newer restaurants like "Ima dana" [There Will Be Days], "Skadarlija" or "Dva bela goluba". In the late 19th century, "Pašonin Bulevar" at the beginning of the street, was the very first Belgrade's music hall.

The renovation and restoration of Skadarlija began in 1968 in accordance with the designs made by the group of prominent artists. They managed to preserve its existing values and introduced modern facilities without interfering with its historical features. In the late 1960s, Skadarlija regained fame as the center of young and bohemian artists. Since 1993, the official opening of the summer season in Skadarlija (restaurants are open the entire year) has been marked by rising a "bohemian flag". There is a special code of conduct for the restaurants and their employees. It includes the types of dishes on the menus, types of uniforms, table clothes or music allowed, and the knowledge of foreign languages. The symbol of Skadarlija is a Fedora hat, mentioned in numerous folk songs, especially in the starogradska musical style, a form of older urban folk music, another emblematic feature of Skadarlija.

After decades of performing in restaurants and outdoors, some performers became synonymous with Skadarlija: singers Toma Zdravković, Silvana Armenulić, Olga Jančevecka. Especially popular was Sofka Nikolić. The first folk music star of newly formed Yugoslavia in the 1920s and 1930s, she published dozens of records, becoming one of the most commercial female singers in Europe. Musicians from Europe and United States were visiting her in Skadarlija, including Josephine Baker, who befriended her. Called "Queen of Skadarlija", Nikolić withdrew in 1939 when her young daughter, her only child, died.

==== Čubura ====
Another neighborhood synonymous for bohemian life was Čubura. Like Skadarlija, it was once an outer village-turned-suburb, along the local stream, Čuburski Potok. Differences included the clientele as Skadarlija was considered to be a fancy and fashionable place while Čubura used to be a gathering place of common people, and decades long communal neglect of Čubura compared to constant renovations in Skadarlija, which gave Čubura a certain flavor. In 1941, on the short distance along the Makenzijeva Street there were 30 kafanas. Čubura was described as "one vast kafana, open all hours".

After 1945, "Vltava" (originally named "Toplica") became a layer's gathering place, "Mala Vltava" of the former political prisoners from the Goli Otok while the more affluent citizens gathered in "Trandafilović". "Orač" was originally opened in Savinac. Though opened in 1949 on the location of former broadcloth making shop, it was remembered as "being much older". The venue was famous for its grill menu. Public protests and petitions followed its closing in 1996, when it was relocated to another location in Čubura, where former Vltava used to be. It was closed in January 2015. "Mlava", at 52 Cara Nikolaja, was an iconic kafana, known for "having a soul". Never a fancy locale, it reached its heyday in the 1970s and got "frozen in the 1980s", with traditional interior. It hosted equally bohemian, artistic elite, local population and construction workers from the nearby sites. By the 2010s it regained iconic status of the small, pampered oasis with the younger clientele and foreign visitors, but still was closed on 1 March 2013 as one of the last remaining "true Belgrade kafanas".

"Trandafilović" was founded in 1929, and demolished in 1961 when authorities planned to cut the old plane tree in restaurants yard. After public protests, including poet Libero Markoni who physically prevented workers from cutting the tree, authorities backed off. New building on the same location was finished in 1967 and the kafana moved in again. In the 21st century it was closed and turned into the household chemicals shop. The plane tree survived and under it, a bistro named "Trandafilović" was opened. Modern Čubura Park was built where the "Kikevac" kafana was located. As it was the central gathering point of the migrants from Crna Trava, the most famous builders in Serbia, a monument dedicated to the nameless "Crna Trava builder" was erected in the park in 2019.

Unlike preserved Skadarlija, Čubura's bohemianism was completely extinguished by the 2020s. Kafanas were closed one by one and the "spirit of Čubura" disappeared. One of the last kafanas, "Kolubara", was transformed into the betting facility while the famed "Čuburska lipa" was demolished in early 2018. It was named after the linden tree, planted in 1924, brought from Lipik spa. The tree was also cut. "Sokolac", at the corner of the Maksima Gorkog and Sazonova streets, was closed in 2017.

==== Other kafanas ====
Other famed venues, outside of Skadarlija, include:

- "?"; opened in 1823, the oldest still operational kafana in Belgrade, with almost the same menu as 200 years ago. After a dispute with the Serbian Orthodox Church, which opposed owner's intention to name it "Kod Saborne crkve" ("Chez Cathedral Church"), the owner painted question mark above the entrance until he figures the new name, and the name stuck. In 1834, the first pool table in Belgrade was installed here.
- "Bled"; in the early 20th century architectural ambience unit near the Jevremovac botanical garden. One of the most famous fish restaurants, it was closed in 2008 and reopened in 2018.
- "Golf"; built on top of Košutnjak in c.1930 and designed by Dragiša Brašovan as a rustic edifice with cellar, ground floor and a loft. The main, garden facing façade is made of 5 arched, glassed openings. The middle one serves as the door between the winter salon and summer garden. Main entrance is on the side of the building. It was named after the golf courses built in 1936, initiated by the regent, Prince Paul of Yugoslavia. There were 9 greens, considered by the foreign ambassadors "among the most beautiful in Europe". The building was restored in 1946. It was originally used as the children's vacation and recuperation facility. To prevent liquidation, it was taken over by the Hospitality Management Chamber which adapted it into the training facility for the Masters (from 1960 Catering) School in 1955. It was later annexed with several rooms and the great hall which continues into the terrace. The students were moved from the boarding rooms in Zeleni Venac into the restaurant in 1975, but the school moved out from the restaurant completely in 1978, which continued as a hospitality venue of its own.
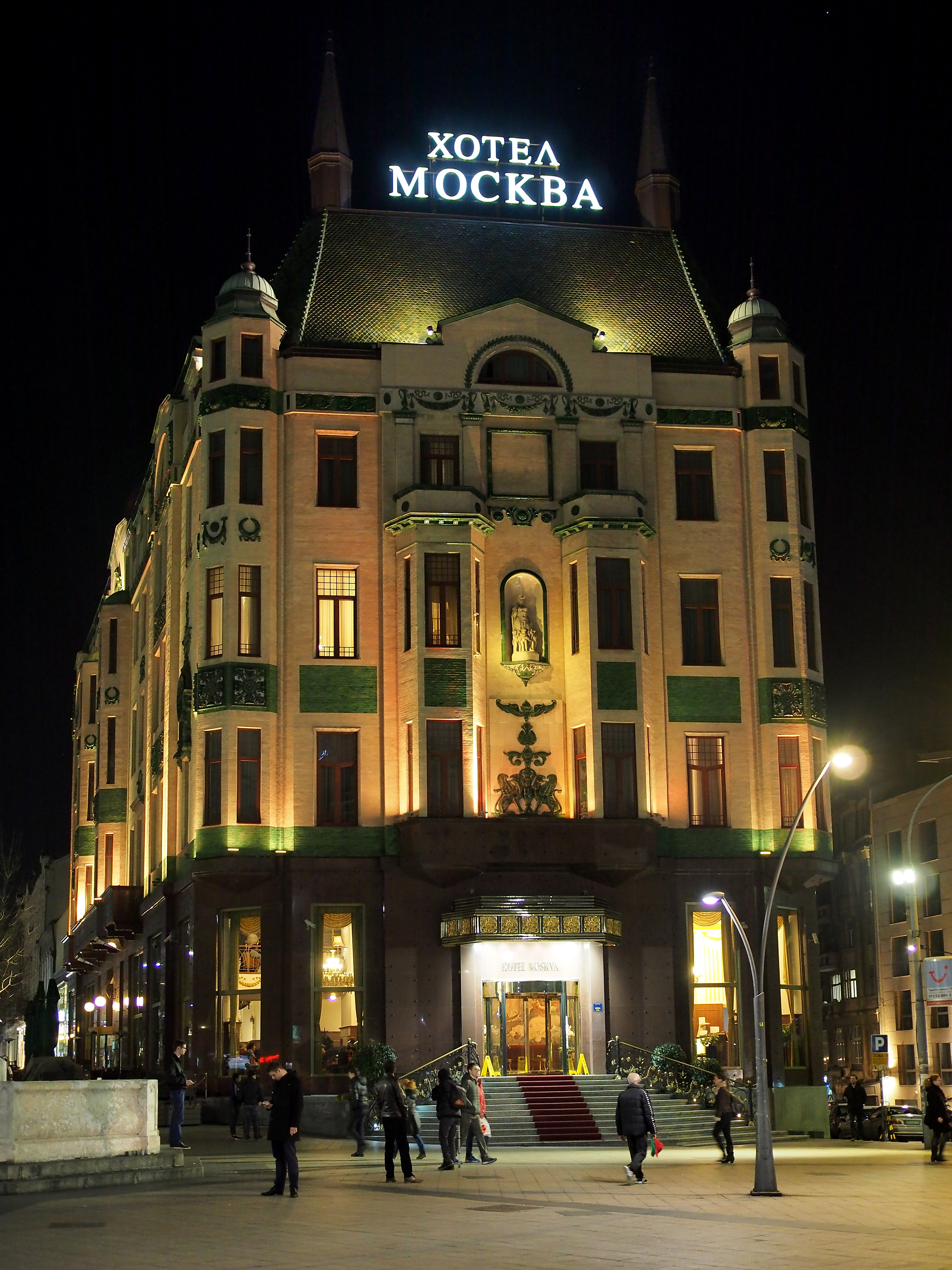
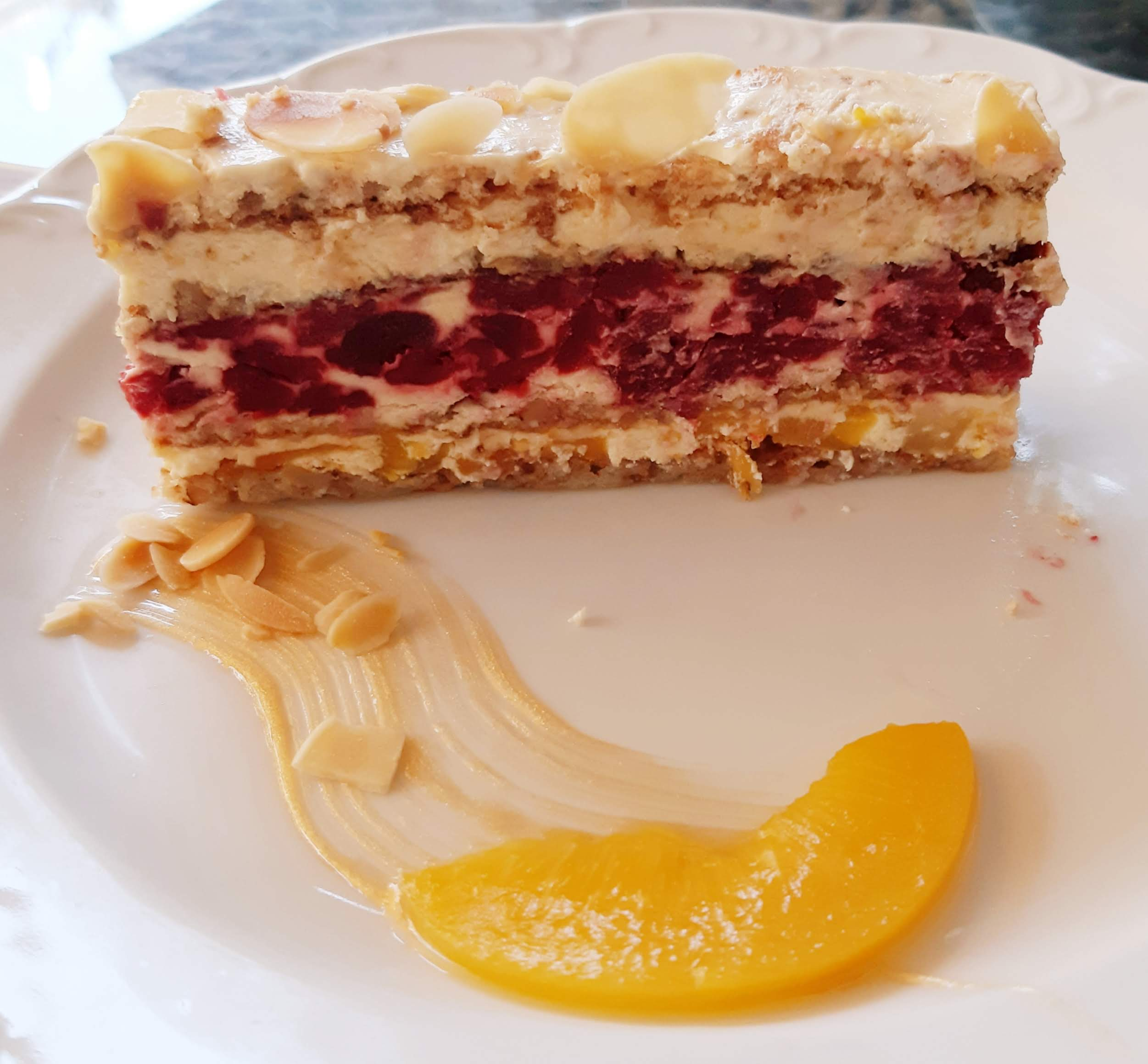
On the left, the Hotel Moskva, often being named as the most beautiful building in Belgrade, is renowned for its restaurant and, especially, pastry shop. On the right, famous Moskva Šnit cake
- "Hotel Moskva", built in 1908. Hotel's restaurant became the "heart of city's social life", where "three or four Serbian governments were formed or brought down". The restaurant was famous for its salon orchestra, tangos and Neapolitan music.
- "Kalenić"; opened in 1938 in the neighborhood of the same name. It was owned by Adolf Sabo who perished in Holocaust and the restaurant was nationalized. In May 2018, the ownership was transferred to the Belgrade's Jewish municipality, as Sabo had no living descendants. Being one of the famous Belgrade kafanas and "symbol of Vračar", Jewish community decided to keep it operational. It is known for its tradition of cooked meals.
- "Klub književnika"; at 7 Francuska Street, established in 1946. Located in the offices of, and operated by, the Association of Writers of Serbia. Highly esteemed among the intellectual elite. Visited by numerous renowned writers, like Lawrence Durrell, Simone de Beauvoir, Jean-Paul Sartre, and others.
- "Kolarac"; founded in 1857 at the corner of Poenkareova (today Makedonska) Street and Theatre (today Republic) Square. It was an elite kafana, where the most important and largest balls in Belgrade were held. Clientele included military officers, high-ranking officials, politicians, artists and members of various societies. Austrian, and later Austro-Hungarian consulate, was located in the same building from 1861 to 1878. In 1896, the first Serbian intercity phone line was opened from "Kolarac" to the city of Niš. The building was later demolished, and kafana moved to the Knez Mihailova Street.
- "Lipov lad"; opened in 1928, became trendy in the late 1950s as a meeting place of artists, actors, poets and local bohemians, and later became a popular family venue. In 1972 the entire neighborhood was reconstructed, including the old kafana, but the linden trees which gave name to kafana were preserved. It gave its name to the entire neighborhood, and to one of local communities of the Zvezdara municipality (sub municipal administrative units).
- "Madera"; at 43 Bulevar Kralja Aleksandra, surrounded by the Tašmajdan Park. It was built in 1937, on the location of the former kafana "Smederevo". It was named after one of the guests brought high quality Madeira wine. It became one of the most distinguished venues, known for its Bohemian clientele of athletes, journalists and actors, called Maderaši (Aca Obradović, Predrag Milojević, Ljuba Tadić, Miroslav Radojčić, Dan Tana, Miljan Miljanić, Slavoljub Đukić, Dragoslav Šekularac). The venue was massively refurbished in 2003.
- "Mornar"; One of the best known "journalists" kafana. The first venue with the electronic cash register in Belgrade (in the 1980s). First mentioned in 1918, it was on a different location, in the Starine Novaka Street, below the Tašmajdan Park. In 1951 moved to its present location, at the corner of Dečanska and Makedonska streets.
- "Orašac"; in Bulevar Kralja Aleksandra, at Vukov Spomenik. Established in the late 19th century. Despite ups and downs, it is highly esteemed among the Belgrade bohemians, with some chroniclers suggesting it deserves to be declared a cultural monument. It is described as having the "best grill under the sun". City plans in 2001 included demolition of the venue, but it survived. In 2021, the plans were revived.
- "Polet"; fish restaurant, located in Cvetni Trg, famous for its fried girice. It was founded in 1952, closed in 2014 and reopened in 2017. It was predated by the venue of the same name which was opened after World War I, itself built on the location of the military mess hall demolished after the 1903 May Coup.
- "Poslednja Šansa"; situated in Tašmajdan Park, the first proper kafana in Belgrade which was officially opened 24/7. Opened in the 1950s as the "Kafe Tašmajdan", it was renamed in the 1960s. It was notorious for fighting and incidents almost every night.
- "Proleće"; located in Topličin Venac, across the Park Vojvoda Vuk (known also as Park Proleće, after the venue), it was opened in the 1950s, on the location of its predecessor from the 1920s. A venue in the Varoš Kapija area was especially popular among the professors and students of the Belgrade University.
- "Ruski car"; in central Knez Mihailova Street, opened in 1890, immediately became the gathering place of the city elite and distinguished guests from abroad. Held to high esteeme as a place where "people come to be seen", it was named after the assassinated tzar Alexander II of Russia. Present building, today a cultural monument, was finished in 1926. During the Interbellum, it was a meeting place for the noble citizens and intellectual elite. Communist authorities after World War II confiscated the building and nationalized it in 1960. That year, the first Belgrade's "express restaurant", a self-serving buffet restaurant with cooked meals, was opened in the building. The name was changed to "Zagreb", the original luxurious interior was demolished, and the expensive cutlery was replaced with plastic plates. In the 1990s the venue was restored and renamed to its original name. After few decades of legal troubles, use of restaurant for money laundering, and change of name to "Vapiano", it was reopened under the old name in December 2019.
- "Srpska kafana"; situated close to the Atelje 212, at 25 Svetogorska Street. Opened by merchant Luka Đurić in 1923, who rented it in 1924 when it was named "Kod Ere". After the Atelje 212 relocated here in 1964, it became a special place for its actors and other theatrical people. Nationalized after World War II, it was returned to the Đurić's descendants in the restitution process. Closed for renovation in 2017 and reopened in 201 when the reporters said that "Svetogorska breathes again".
- "Stara Hercegovina"; "gastronomical Mecca" in Stari Grad, named "Skoplje" until 1991.
- "Sunce"; opened in 1966 next to the building of the Belgrade Youth Center. Became one of the most exclusive restaurants in the city, gathering place of Belgrade's crème de la crème. In time gained reputation as the "advocates" venue.
- "Šaran"; established in 1896 in Zemun. Originally a gathering place for the local fishermen and ferry passengers to Crvenka, across the Danube. Today, one of the "first associations on Zemun".
- "Ušće"; built in 1960, entered Serbian textbooks of architecture as the first public facility of the contemporary architecture in Belgrade. Due to its location near the riverbank and confluence of the Sava into the Danube, with the view on Kalemegdan, Cathedral Church, and the old section of Belgrade across the Sava, the restaurant was featured in numerous movies, music videos and broadcasts, and until the 1990s was one of the most distinguished restaurants in town. The restaurant was refurbished and ceremonially reopened on 1 June 2017 under the name "Nacionalna klasa".
- "Venecija"; on the bank of the Danube in Zemun, in Zemunski Kej. Opened in 1913 while Zemun was within Austro-Hungary, with the terrace on stilts above the river, it was a fish restaurant at first but soon became famous for its fish soup and a good ambience, and popular among Belgrade's elite who visited by train or boat. After World War II, for the long time Venecija was the most popular restaurant in Zemun, known for the panoramic position above the river and being synonymous with good service and quality food. Labeled as the symbol of Old Zemun and Old Belgrade, it was credited with symbolically connecting two towns, even before the official merger. Due to the constant flooding, the embankment was gradually built, so the venue is now some 20 m (66 ft) away from the river. From April 2019 to 2020 it was transformed into the Chinese restaurant "Lotus".
- "Zlatno burence"; opened in 1866 in Prizrenska Street. Became gathering point of the Komite, members of the Serbian Chetnik Organization, and the recruitment center for the volunteers in the Serbian-Turkish and Balkan Wars. Original building was demolished in the early 1930s when the modern highrise was built on the location. Kafana is today situated close to its original location at the corner, where the stone barrel was placed as a symbol of the venue. Popular but probably false anecdote is that Winston Churchill, while working as a journalist and writing bad reports on Serbs, was beaten up in the kafana.

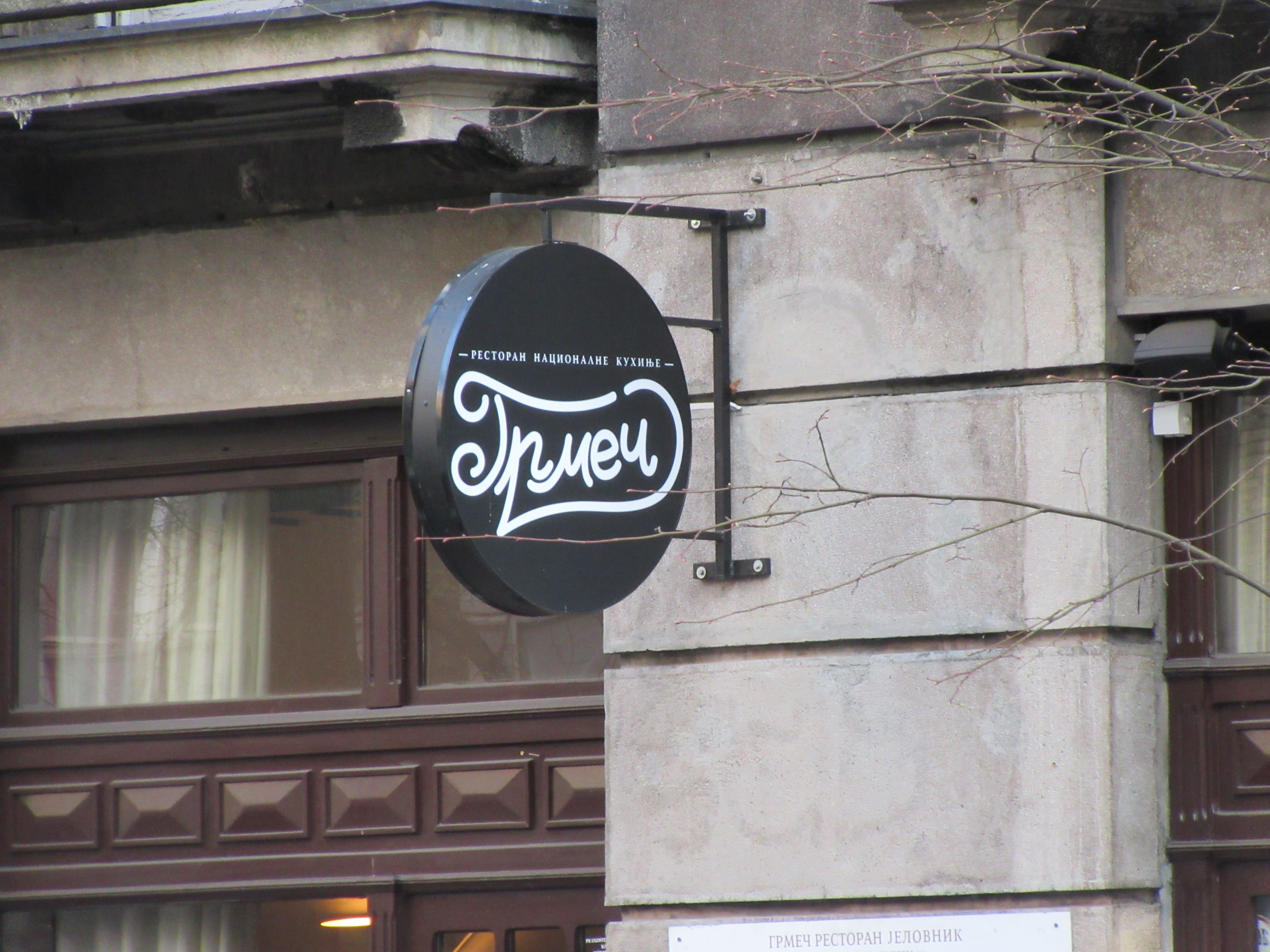
Sign of the Grmeč kafana, one of three members of the infamous "Bermuda Triangle"

The Bermuda Triangle is a colloquial name for three rivaling kafanas in the Makedonska Street ("Kafana Federation"). At various points of time, all three were closed, but two were later reopened: The bohemian clientele included city's best known artists, writers, actors, journalists, musicians and city luminaries, like Momo Kapor, Pavle Vuisić, Mika Antić, Raša Popov, Minimaks, Bata Živojinović, Ivo Andrić, Zoran Radmilović, Olivera Marković, Miloje Orlović, Borislav Mihajlović Mihiz, Đoko Vještica, Zuko Džumhur, Bogdan Tirnanić. The name emerged in the 1960s, as many writers and journalists would "disappear" between three kafanas, sometimes for several days. The name was popularized in the early 1980s by the journalist Radmila Jovović. Journalists of the nearby Politika gathered in "Grmeč", of the Radio Belgrade in "Pod Lipom", while "Šumatovac" was a neutral, joint territory. The venues were also known for one of the symbols of the old-style Serbian kafanas: red-white checkered tablecloths. When Knez Mihailova Street was turned into the pedestrian zone in 1987, journalists asked the same for the Makedonska Street (where five additional kafanas formed "Octagon" with the Bermuda Triangle), but the motion wasn't adopted.

- "Grmeč"; original venue, a beer hall "Kod Muse", was opened by the Lazić family in the mid-1930s, as the 25th kafana in the street. During the yard works, in order to arrange the pub's garden, a Roman sarcophagus with the body of a centurion, and pieces of sacral jewelry were discovered. They were all exhibited in the venue. As German occupational forces commandeered the building of the First Belgrade Gymnasium, the students attended classes here. After the war it was renamed after the Grmeč mountain. It was closed after the fire in June 2011 but was reopened in June 2018.
- "Pod lipom"; at the corner with Kondina Streets. It was founded during the Interbellum as the restaurant-bowling alley and the gathering place of the Slovenes in Belgrade. The bowling alley was later closed, and the restaurant was demolished in the late 1960s. New building was built in 1971 and the new restaurant was opened. It was closed in 2003 and later turned into the Pizza Hut restaurant, which was also closed. After becoming a store, in 2019 it was announced that the new, commercial building will be built instead.
- "Šumatovac"; at No. 33. A home to journalists, writers, opera singers, actors, athletes and professional gamblers. It was closed from 2013 to December 2015, though after the reopening it was considered more of a restaurant then a proper kafana it used to be.

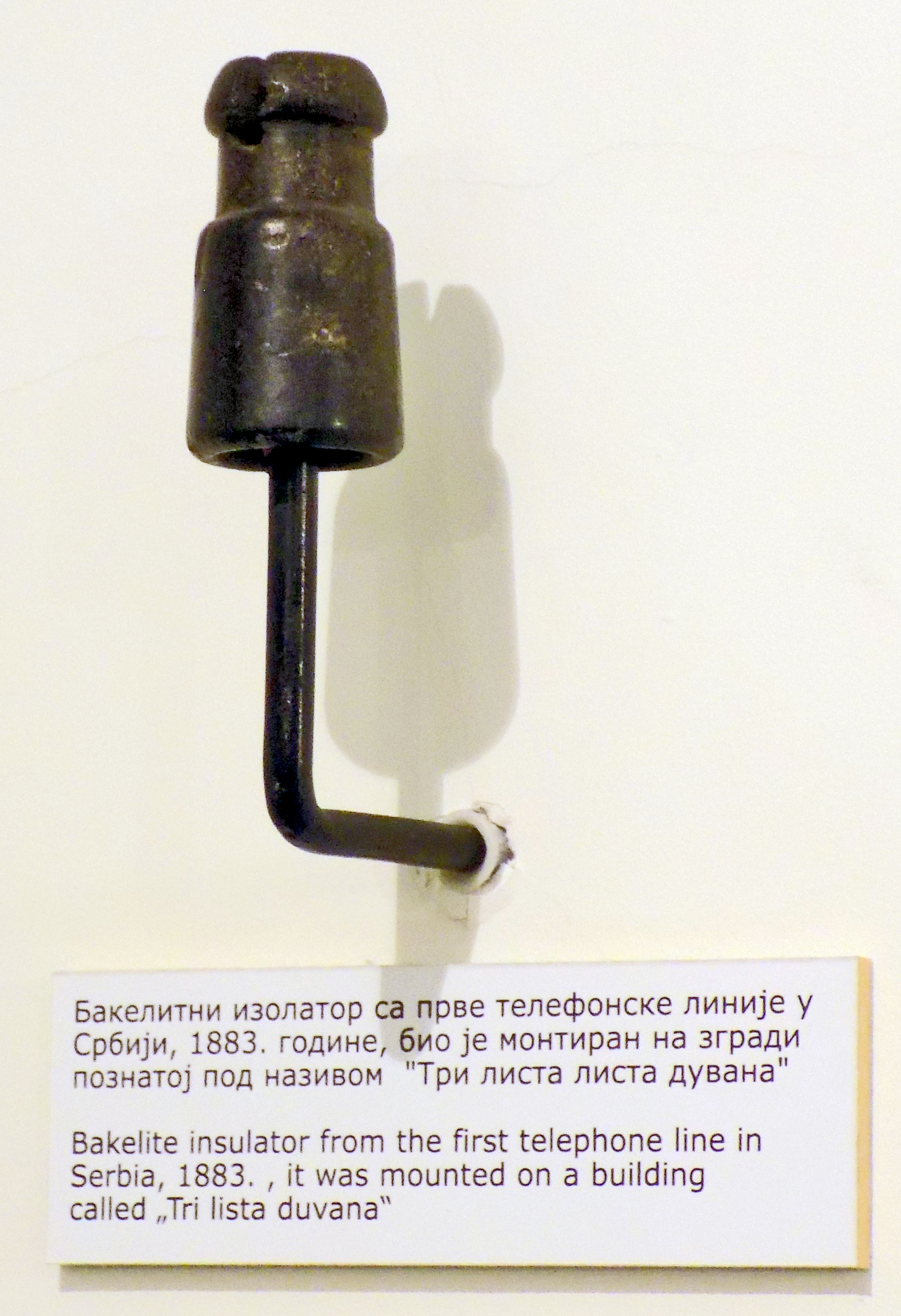
Bakelite insulator from the first telephone line in Serbia, opened in 1883. It was on the façade of the "Tri Lista Duvana" until the building was demolished in 1989. Now exhibited in the PTT Museum

Well known venues closed since the economic collapse in the late 1980s, include:

- "Atina"; situated in Terazije, on the location of the former kafana "Dva tigra" which had a bad reputation being described as a dump (ćumez). Atina's popularity was especially boosted in the 1970s and the 1980s, when it was adapted into the "express restaurant" (hot food bar) and became the first pizzeria in Belgrade.
- "Buffet of Hotel Bristol"; hotel was built in 1912. Close to both the Belgrade Main railway station and Belgrade Bus Station, it was always filled with "interesting faces". When Savamala became a hipsters center in the 2010s, the buffet's clientele represented mix of "cultural and non-cultural" which brought the "explosion of charm". Interiors remained unchanged from the 1960s and 1970s, until the hotel was closed in 2018.
- "Grgeč"; at 62 Bulevar Kralja Aleksandra. The original kafana dated from the 19th century and was on the left side of the street. The building was demolished during the World War II bombings. In the late 1950s, the new restaurant was opened across the old location and was given the original name, as it was intended to be a fish restaurant. It wasn't, but the name survived and soon became the favorite spot for journalists and reporters. It was closed in 2007 and replaced by the McDonald's restaurant.
- "Kasina"; established in 1858 in a house on Terazije, later upgraded to a hotel. As some gambling was organized in it, it was named after Italian word casino. It was a "headquarter" of the members of the Progressive party. In 1918 it temporarily hosted the National Assembly and 1920-1921 the National Theatre. Present building was finished in 1922. Hotel survived until today, but not he restaurant, famous for its fast food-type sold Wiener schnitzels.
- "Lion"; at the corner of Bulevar Kralja Aleksandra and Miloša Zečevića. It gave its name to the entire neighborhood. It was opened during Interbellum and named after the French city of Lyon. Clientele included state clerks, military officers, teachers and writers. After World War II it became a "typical socialist kafana", popular among the families for Sunday lunch, but also visited by the municipal clerks. In the 1990s turned into the restaurant and then brewery, before being closed by the end of the decade. The venue was later turned into the grocery store.
- "Mihajlovac"; the best known kafana in Banovo Brdo. It was demolished in 2017 to make way for the massive, new building.
- "Promaja"; in Savamala, across the tracks from the Karađorđeva Street, on the port promenade. Mentioned for the first time in 1906, Branislav Nušić listed it in his book "Belgrade kafanas" and described it as the "symbol of the city spirit, woven into its name" (draught, flow of air). Since 1968 it was located in the temporary object on the promenade. Planned for demolition from 2016, on 25 October 2019 it was forcefully demolished, with police assistance.
- "Tri lista duvana"; "one of the most famous Belgrade kafanas ever" was founded in 1882 at the corner of the Bulevar Kralja Aleksandra and the Kneza Miloša Street. The first phone line in Serbia, 300 m (980 ft) long, was conducted here in 1883. The building was demolished in 1989 to make way for the Hilton Hotel which was never built.
- "Vidin kapija"; opened in 1861 at the corner of the modern Palmotićeva, Hilandarska and Džordža Vašingtona streets. Original name is unknown, but after German contractors were given the job of building the neighboring First Town Hospital, it was named "Kod sedam hrabrih Švaba" in 1864, and had a drawing of seven drunk Germans chasing a rabbit, above the door. This was a reason why it was closed during the German occupation in World War II. Regular visitors were some of the greatest name of culture and science, like Đura Jakšić, Branislav Petronijević and Vojislav Ilić. After the war, it was reopened in the late 1950s as "Vidin kapija". It was closed in the mid-2000s, and reopened as ultra-modern club "Medžik", designed by Karim Rashid. The club was closed few years later, followed by several other short-lived, unsuccessful venues since then.
- "Zora"; located in the Balkan Cinema building, on the Makedonska Street side, it succeeded the pre-World War II kafana "Ruska lira". Pilots of the 6th Fighter Aviation Regiment, which defended the capital Belgrade, waited here for the orders in the wake of the German attack in 1941. A bit after the midnight on 6 April 1941 they were summoned and were transported to the airport in Tošin Bunar by the taxis which also waited all day in front of the building. In 2002 it was closed and the casino was opened instead. In 2012 another kafana was opened on the same location but was reported as "face-lifted for new customers" and as such "changed to unrecognizability and therefore repulsive to many".
- "Žagubica"; not much distinguished, but very popular old-style kafana. Due to its location, at the busy corner of Ruzveltova and 27. Marta (today Kraljice Marije) streets, it became the popular meeting place ("lets meet at Žagubica") and the surrounding neighborhood was named after it. Though it was later turned into the modern café and renamed "Tramvaj", the citizens continued to refer to the building and its location as Žagubica.

Others: "Marš na Drinu" (Dorćol, known for the secretive Serbian New Year celebrations during Communism), "Beli grad" (Zeleni Venac), "Morava", "Plitvice" (Šumice), "Složna braća" (demolished to make way for the Hotel Park), "Vardar" (Cvetni trg), "Tabor" (Vračar), "Mala Astronomija", "Velika astronomija" (both in Savinac), "Arilje", "Zona Zamfirova" (Cvetni trg, opened in 1937, demolished in 2011), "Prešernova klet" (Dečanska Street, since 1952, first slot club, then Black Turtle pub), "Dušanov grad" (Terazije), "Kragujevac", "Bosna", "Rad", "Starac Vujadin", "Stara varoš" (Zeleni venac).

=== Cultural and historical significance ===
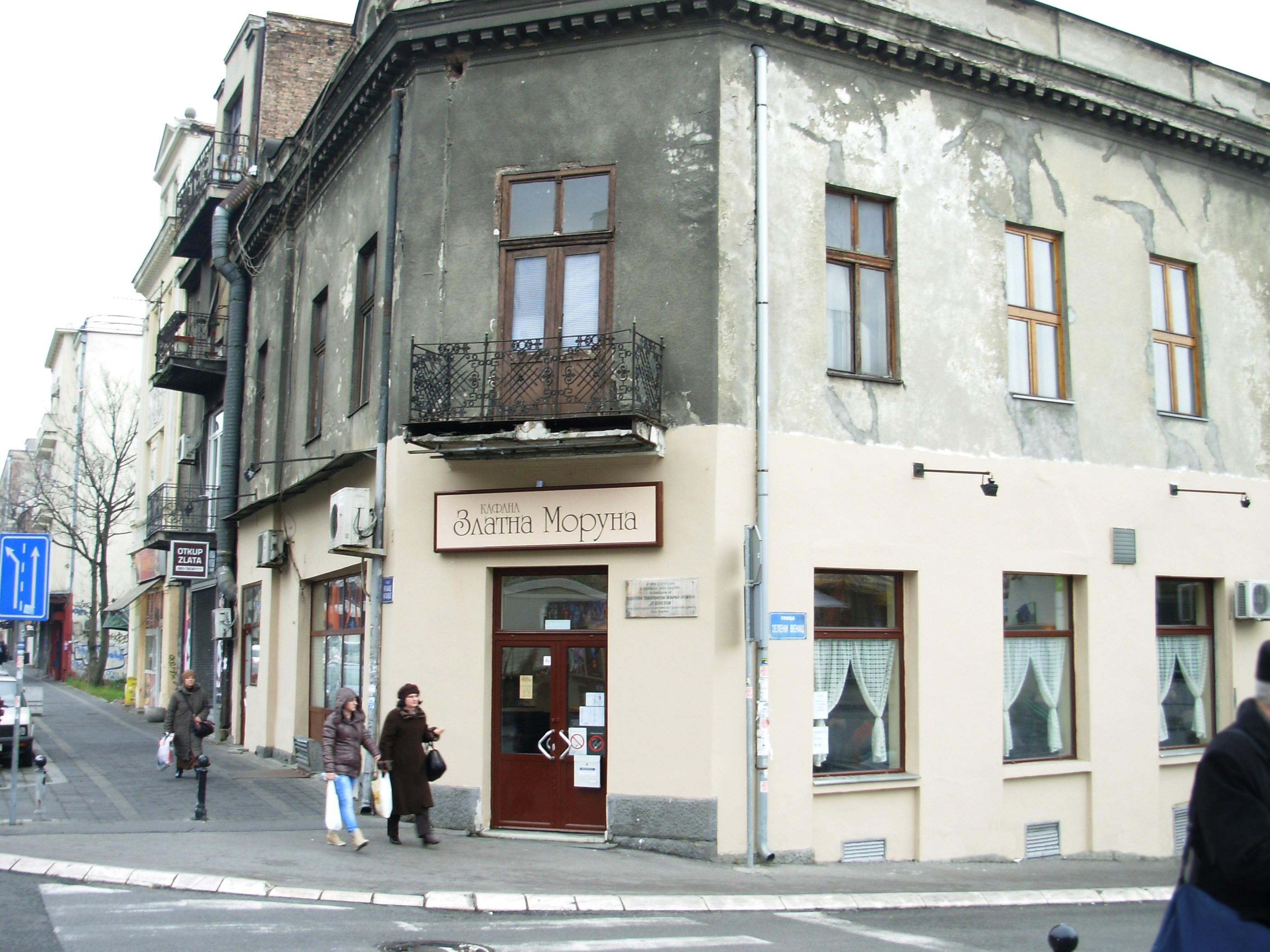
Zlatna Moruna, gathering place of the Young Bosnia revolutionaries in the 1910s

Historian Dubravka Stojanović singles out kafanas from other institutions of the civil society (salons, clubs, associations), as the first institute of the new society, both in terms of chronology and importance. She described it as the first democratic space for which no "invitation" (literacy, membership card, party discipline) was needed. Due to the volatile history in the Balkans, various kafanas served as gathering places and recruitment centers for numerous wars and rebellions: "Crni Konj" (Zadarska Street; for individual fighters in the Serbian-Ottoman Wars), "Kragujevac" (Karađorđeva Street); Garibalidians, Italian volunteers in the Serbian-Turkish Wars of 1876–1878, "Zlatni Krst" (Serbian volunteers for the same conflict), etc.

Kafanas were also important for the economy. First public places for drafting contracts and merchant treaties were kafanas. This is why they originally developed around the main merchant areas and old khans. They were socially important as they allowed for the poor classes to participate in economic activities, too. Most important in this sense were "Zisina kafana" (opened before 1826 in Savamala), "Kod Paje kantardžije" and nearby "?". Kafanas hosted numerous firsts in Belgrade: bank (First Serbian Bank, in "Staro Zdanje", went bankrupt in 1875), exchange office, labor market, stock exchange (in "Bosna", corner of Karađorđeva and Travnička, in 1895), insurance office, private medical office, photographic studio. Every guild had "its own" kafana.

Kafana's importance in Belgrade's history is such that numerous historical or anecdotal events occurred in them:

- 1834 - the first game of billiard in Belgrade was held in "?".
- 1859 - the first assembly after the return of Prince Miloš Obrenović to the throne was held in "Velika Pivnica", so as many future parliamentary sessions.
- 1867 - official celebration of the complete handing over of the city by the Ottomans to the Serbs was held at the "Kod Rajića junaka serbskog"
- 1876 - Russian colonel Nikolay Nikolayevich Raevsky the Younger signed application as a volunteer in the Serbian army against the Turks in the "Crni Konj". Raevsky was Tolstoy's inspiration for Count Aleksei Vronsky in Anna Karenina.
- 1876 - Red Cross of Serbia founded in "Građanska kasina".
- 1881 - the first telephone line installed in "Tri lista duvana".
- 1881 - Serbian Journalists Association founded in "Građanska kasina".
- 1882 - the first light bulb lit in "Hamburg".
- 1894 - Belgrade Stock Exchange opened in "Kasina" (later moved to "Bosna"), which also hosted parliamentary sessions due to the unrepresentative building of the Serbian assembly. This continued after the creation of the Kingdom of the Serbs, Croats and Slovenes in 1918, until the new assembly building was finished in 1936. Also hosted performances of the National Theatre in Belgrade until 1920.
- 1896 - first public motion picture show in Serbia held in "Zlatni krst", on Terazije, on 6 June 1896, with Lumière brothers personally showing the film. King Aleksandar Obrenović was in the audience. The tickets were pricey and the films were screened for the next six months. The Lumière brothers' camera remained in Belgrade and is kept at Yugoslav Film Archive.
- 1896 - first intercity phone line established from "Kolarac" to the city of Niš. On the Belgrade side there was a concert of the vocal ensemble "Stanković", while on the Niš side it was a singers' society "Branko".
- 1900s - travelling cinemas began to show movies in "Kasina", where the first permanent cinema was opened in 1910.
- 1900s - "Kolarac" was a regular meeting place of young officers headed by Dragutin Dimitrijević Apis, who here plotted the 1903 May Coup, which ended with the deaths of king Alexander and queen Draga, and termination of the Obrenović dynasty in 1903. Also, the first book fair in the city was held here.
- 1900s - the first individual public clock in Belgrade was placed in front of the "Kod Albanije".
- 1905 - elementary school "Karađorđe" established in the "Gavrilović", which operated as school by day and as kafana in the afternoon and evening. Same thing happened few years later with the elementary school "Jovan Cvijić" and the "Lavadinović" kafana.
- 1910s - members of the revolutionary movement Young Bosnia, including Gavrilo Princip, gathered in the "Zlatna Moruna" and planned their actions, including the assassination of Archduke Franz Ferdinand of Austria in 1914, used by Austro-Hungary as the pretext for World War I.
- in time, various neighborhoods of Belgrade or important buildings, were named after the kafanas: Zeleni Venac, London, Lipov Lad, Mostar, Lion, Čukarica, Cvetko, Golf, Gospodarska Mehana, Dva Bela Goluba, Palace Albanija, Ruski Car, Mihajlovac, Žagubica, Park "Tri ključa", etc.

As of 2023, on the administrative territory of Belgrade, there were 18 former or still operational catering and tourist facilities which were declared cultural monuments:

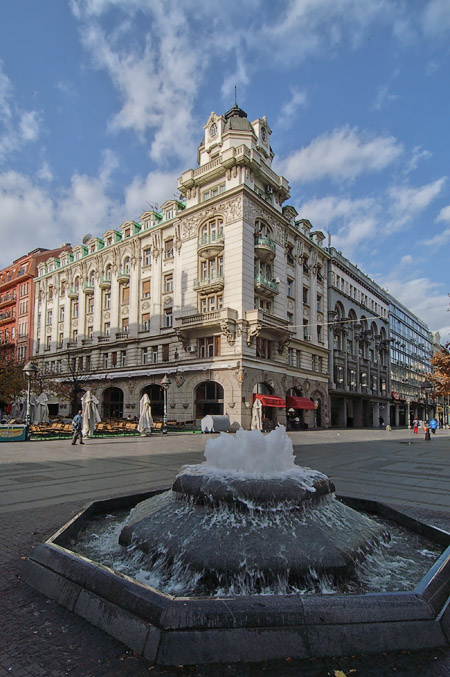
Ruski car Tavern, built in 1926 in the main commercial and pedestrian zone, the Knez Mihailova Street. A cultural monument since 1987

| Building | Location | Built | Protected | Notes |
|---|---|---|---|---|
| Meyhane of Uzun Mirko | Mislođin, Obrenovac | <1806 | 1969 | outside of city proper |
| Janić Kafana | 19 Karađorđeva Street, Ostružnica | early 1800s | 1972 | outside of city proper |
| Janić Shops | 4 Karađorđevih Ustanika Square, Ostružnica | early 1800s | 1971 | outside of city proper |
| Kafana ? | 6 Kralja Petra Street, Kosančićev Venac | 1823 | 1981 | still operational |
| Hammam of Prince Miloš | 14 Admirala Geprata Street, Savamala | 1837 | 1948 | not operational |
| Manak's House | 7 Gavrila Principa Street, Savamala | <1840 | 1963 | part of the Ethnographic Museum |
| Old Meyhane in Veliko Selo | Maršala Tita Street, Veliko Selo | <1850 | 1981 | outside of city proper |
| Old Meyhane in Barajevo | Bagrdan, Barajevo | <1850 | 2001 | outside of city proper |
| Old Meyhane in Ušće | Ušće, Obrenovac | c.1850 | 1968 | outside of city proper |
| Hotel Srpska Kruna | 56 Knez Mihailova Street, Kalemegdan | 1869 | 1981 | city library |
| Hotel Nacional (Belgrade) | 9 Pariska Street, Kosančićev Venac | 1869 | 1984 | administrative building |
| Steam Mill | 15 Vojvode Mišića Street, Savamala | 1902 | 1987 | Radisson Blu Old Mill hotel |
| Hotel Bristol | 50 Karađorđeva Street, Savamala | 1912 | 1987 | closed in 2018 |
| Kafana Ruski Car | 7 Knez Mihailova Street, Republic Square | 1926 | 1987 | still operational |
| Hotel Prag | 27 Kraljice Natalije Street, Savamala | 1929 | 2013 | still operational |
| Hotel Avala | Avala, Beli Potok | 1931 | 2007 | still operational |
| Hotel Mažestik | 28 Obilićev Venac Street, Obilićev Venac | 1937 | 1997 | still operational |
| Hotel Metropol | 69 Bulevar kralja Aleksandra, Tašmajdan | 1957 | 2001 | still operational |

== Modern nightlife ==
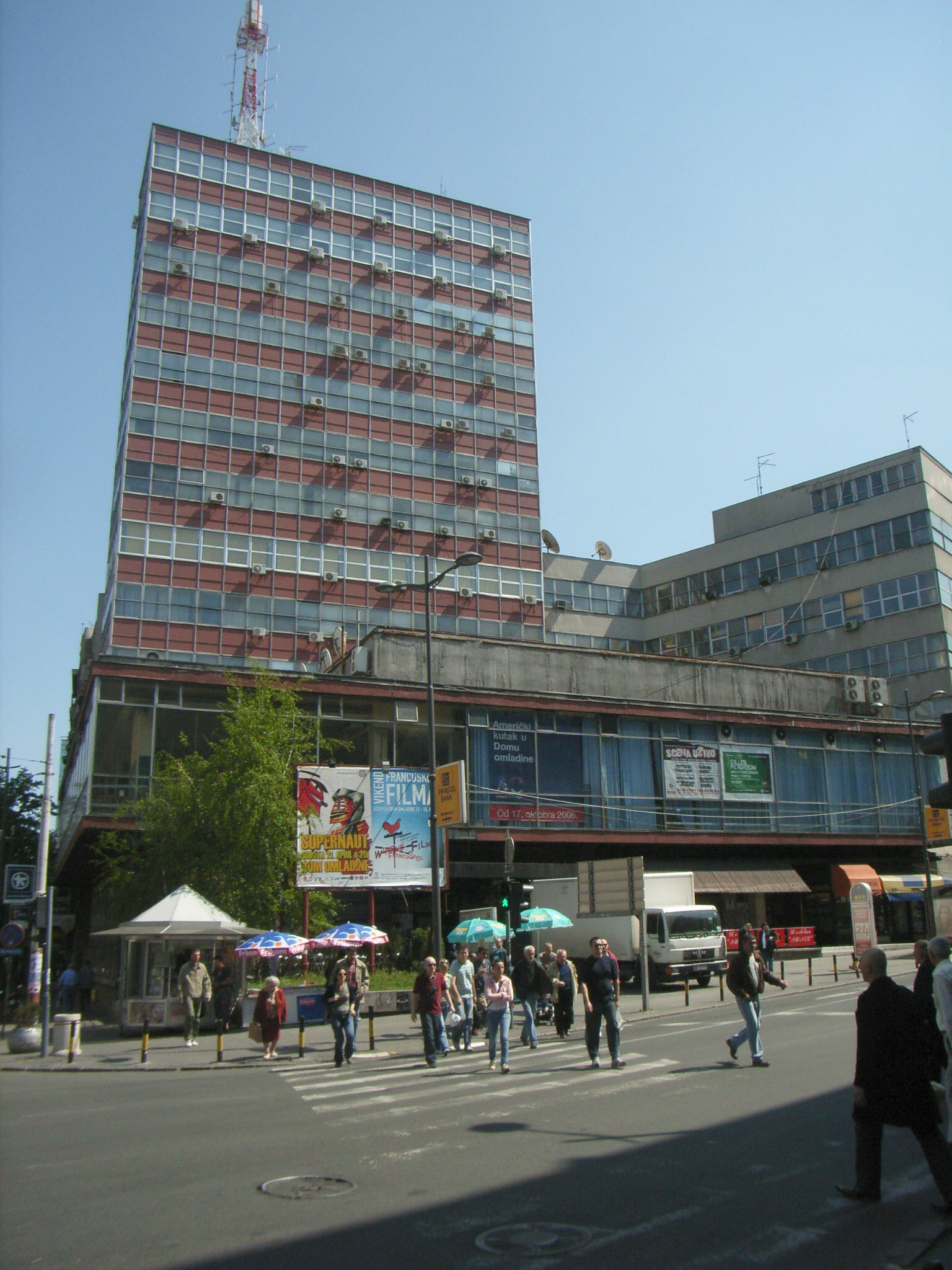
Belgrade Youth Center, founded in 1964, dance hall from 1966, disco club from 1969

Prolonged dance evenings "till dawn" (igranke) were the precursors of modern nightlife after World War II. In the new, Communist regime, new types of music became almost obligatory, like the kozaračko kolo, but in the period immediately following the Allied victory this music was mixed with Russian romances, jazz, swing and boogie-woogie. Western music especially became popular after the film Sun Valley Serenade with Glenn Miller's music reached Yugoslav cinemas. Dances included tango, waltz, foxtrot, slowfox, and especially popular trucking, or treskavac in Serbian ("shaking dance"). However, with political changes regime's attitude soon switched. By the end of 1945 the American music was labeled as "capitalist fun which spoils our youth and leads into sexual and other pathologies". Accused of undermining discipline and public moral, the trucking was officially banned in the early 1946. By 1951 the state propaganda attacked boogie-woogie ("eccentric, vulgar and decadent"), while entire public campaign was orchestrated in 1952 against jazz, which "influenced the animal sensations". This first post war period of dance nights lasted from 1945 to 1963.

First night clubs, referred to as disko[teka] in Serbian, were opened in the second half of the 1960s as a result of the popularity of rock and roll. First rock and roll news can be found in press already in 1956. Public reaction lacked the disputes and rage of the previous types of music, like jazz or contemporary dance in the late 1940s and early 1950s. It appeared that the older generations didn't perceive rock and roll, nor the accompanying way of dancing or dressing as a problem, so the reaction was cold and indifferent. By this time, Yugoslavia was more open to foreign influences compared to other Communist states, citizens freely travelled abroad, and no one stopped creation of numerous rock bands, called vokalno-instrumentalni sastavi, or VIS ("vocal-instrumental band").

At first, the penetration of rock and roll was slow, but in time gained momentum so the media couldn't ignore it. One of the pioneer promoters was Nikola Karaklajić, chess master and editor at Radio Belgrade. His TV show Concert for crazy young people was the most popular. It premiered in January 1967 and was aired once a month until 1969. Another popular TV show was Maksimetar (1970–1972). Among the printed media, the most influential was Džuboks, which debuted on 3 May 1966.

=== Shy 1960s ===
Entry in the clubs was free or the fees were symbolic. Some had passes, but they were easily obtained. Still, the security guards had a great latitude letting someone in. People were searched and checked whether they are underage or intoxicated. First clubs were small and located in private houses and apartments with city authorities being bent on closing them.

==== Euridika ====
Predecessor of the future disco clubs opened in Vračar, in a private house at 33 Molerova Street in 1961, becoming one of the most important cultural hotspots in the late 1960s. The club was an offshoot of the Youth Theater DADOV, founded in 1958. The idea was that, through drinks and dance nights, the money for the theater will be collected. Once a week, a Club of the popular music lovers gathered here. The building itself was built in 1921 and was the pre-war house of the Tomić family. Performers, some of which launched their careers here, included Elipse, Safiri, Zlatni Dečaci, Dobri Drugovi, Crni Biseri, Crni Panteri (founded by the students from Congo Kinshasa), Boba Stefanović, etc. When Crni Panteri performed Shake Your Hips, the ecstatic audience trashed and broke the furniture. The audience was mostly divided in two groups: the Beatles fans and the Rolling Stones fans. It was closed in the late 1970s.

==== Youth Center - 202 ====
Belgrade Youth Center, at 22 Makedonska Street, was opened in 1964, while Dancing Hall was introduced on 16 October 1966. Live performances included the most popular rock bands of the day, like Siluete, Crni Biseri, Džentlmeni, Zlatni Dečaci. Club had a matinée (15:00-19:00) and night programs (19:30-21:00). It was adapted into the discothèque "202" in 1969 in collaboration with Radio Belgrade 202 station which directly broadcast the program from the club. The disco was noted for the lack of problems or incidents and as a meeting place of the children from the wealthy families ("working class youth almost couldn't be seen in it"). In the late 1970s, it became the gathering place for the punk enthusiasts.

==== Kod Laze Šećera ====
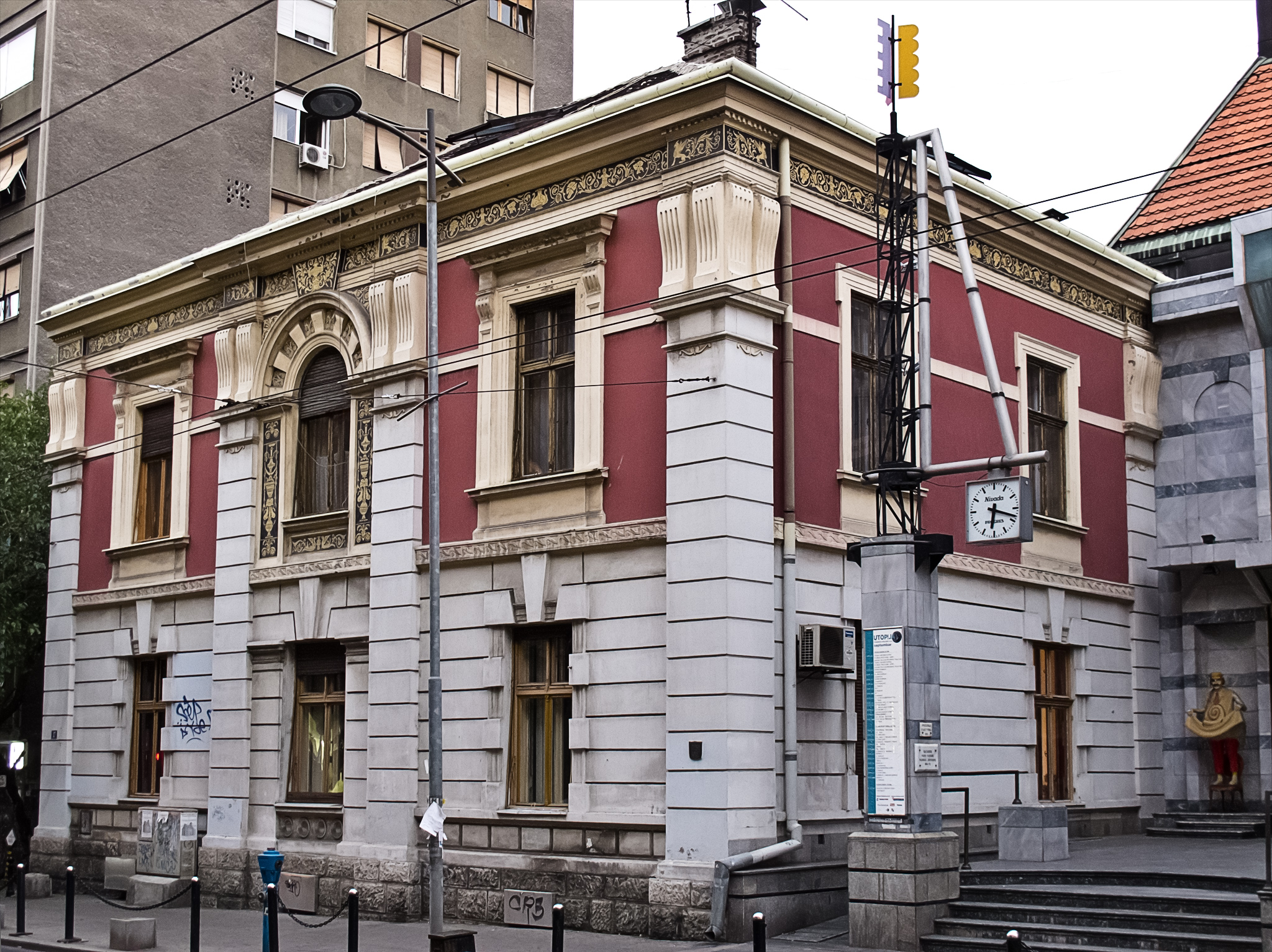
Jevrem Grujić's House, location of the Belgrade's first disco club "Kod Laze Šećera" in 1967

First proper disco in Belgrade, "Kod Laze Šećera", was opened on 24 April 1967. It was announced that Lord Snowdon would attend the event, but he didn't show up. The venue was located at 17 Ive Lole Ribara Street (today Svetogorska), in the Jevrem Grujić's House, in Stari Grad. It was close to the Atelje 212 theatre, so at the opening almost the entire acting troop was present, so as the dramatists, authors, painters, etc., including Mira Trailović, Jovan Ćirilov, Ivan Tabaković, Dušan Matić. Founder of the disco was Lazar Šećerović, a translator, bon vivant and direct descendant of Jevrem Grujić. At the time of opening, other discos existed only in Paris, London and Milan, while it was 10 years before the famous Studio 54 in New York City was opened. Working hours were from 18:30 to 1:00, chaste compared to the modern times. The music was mostly soul: Aretha Franklin, Otis Redding, The Temptations, Dusty Springfield. The venue was small, situated in the basement, but still was a major improvement in the nightlife offer in the city, credited with "democratization of fun".

The club introduced several other "firsts", like girls without male companions, people dancing alone or after parties when selected groups would move to the upper floor for more quiet fun. The club was also called "Lola", after the street, and was hailed as the "only disco between Trieste and Vladivostok". Guests included members of the international jet-set who visited Belgrade: Pierre Cardin, Paco Rabanne, Catherine Deneuve, Judi Dench, Nina Ricci, Omar Sharif, Marisa Berenson, Alain Delon, Claudia Cardinale. During the day, rock bands were practicing in the club. The venue also hosted the first pop art exhibition in Yugoslavia, which included Roy Lichtenstein's graphics and Andy Warhol's lithographs.

Opening was supported by the basketball club KK Crvena Zvezda. Though all the necessary permits were obtained, not everything went smooth. Municipal authorities debated about it, and some described it as a "lair for the young alcoholics, junkies, debauchers and rich kids." Owners claimed that the venue is a clean and decent location, adapted with taste which included the green Italian wallpapers and black floor linoleum. They also defended the club naming celebrities who were regular guests: Milena Dravić, Vera Čukić, Arsen Dedić, Branko Pleša, Biljana Nevajda. Neighboring citizens were against the club. They tried administratively to prevent it from being open but when that failed, they sabotaged the venue as they could, like throwing garbage at the guests who were entering the house. Concerns showed to be substantiated in the beginning, as the guests were making loud noise at the entrance and unbridled youngsters, mostly of wealthy parents, were causing too much of a commotion with their cars, vespas and motorbikes. Owners later placed two guards outside who had a specific duty to keep the noise down.

The club came under the attack of numerous bans and regulations, including the one which allowed dancing, but banned music. The authorities also accused the club of playing "enemy music", of destroying the morality of the Socialist youth and declared it a CIA headquarters in Yugoslavia. Military generals in the state's Supreme Defense Council concluded that club has to be closed. Fighting both the authorities and the neighbors proved too much for the owners, so they closed the club in 1968. Still, it remains as the first such venue in entire Yugoslavia and the wider region of the Communist ruled states. For a while, secret parties continued to be organized.

==== KST ====
KST, short for "Klub studenata tehnike", was unofficially established in 1952 for the students of three technical faculties (architecture, electrical engineering and civil engineering). It was located in one of the laboratories, almost in the basement, at 73 Bulevar Revolucije, today Bulevar Kralja Aleksandra. High School for Technical Engineering, to which the faculties were subordinated at the time, made the club official in March 1954 which was used both for studying and dance parties.

Disco was opened on 29 February 1968. Originally, it had only one magnetophon. The music was various: funk, soul, disco, rock and roll, twist, waltz. The club was known for promoting young musicians and some of the most important Yugoslav rock-groups performed here in their early days, like the Riblja Čorba, Poslednja Igra Leptira, Haustor or Partibrejkers. The first "unplugged" concert in the Balkans was performed here by the Bijelo Dugme. Many groups recorded albums here. In time, it became "another house" for musicians, and the club which "makes DJs". The club also organized theatrical and poetry evenings, freshmen welcome parties, fashion shows and the famous pre-New Year's Eve masquerade balls. Performers included greatest stars of Serbian acting, like Ljuba Tadić, Olivera Marković, Snežana Savić, Tanja Bošković, Petar Kralj and Ljuba Moljac. The venue also became an important place for public debates and discussions.

The club was always known for the relaxed, home-style dress code (sweaters, hoodies, plaid shirts, no heavy make-up, high heels, tight jackets, etc.). As one of the first students' and night clubs in the city, and the only one from this period that still works, KST achieved cult status among the city youth. A 2019 documentary about KST was filmed by Zoran Bulović, commemorating venue's 65th anniversary.

==== SKC ====
"Studentski Kulturni Centar", shortened to SKC, was opened in 1968 at 48 Kralja Milana Street. It was later regarded as the way for Yugoslav president Josip Broz Tito to appease the riots which erupted as the 1968 student rebellion. After punk music arrived in Belgrade, the visitors mostly belonged to the punk subculture. In time it became the "safe haven" for avant-garde artists and alternative rock music in the 1970s, and the emerging New wave music since the late 1970s, including the regular performances of Idoli, Električni Orgazam and Šarlo Akrobata.

It became the central stage of the alternative cultural life in Belgrade and numerous bands began their careers or performed in the venues basements, improvised studios and workshops, next to the most popular bands of the era. The SKC have two main spaces inside: small club on the ground level and larger hall at the first floor. Parts of the building serve as the café and as the bookstore, and the venue also hosts art exhibitions. As of 2023, SKC is still operational.

=== Joyfull 1970s ===
At the start of the decade the night life for the young was still undeveloped. Reports lamented that, "unfortunately", kafanas were still predominant. The alcohol was freely served to the minors, while in some venues dinner was obligatory. Modern kafanas, adapted for the youth, didn't exist. There were only several dance halls where "better bands" performed, the rest organized "typically dilettante and irresponsible" dance parties. Only few had jukeboxes or other "automated musical machines". Most popular disco clubs were "Youth Center", "Go-Go Dancing" in Tašmajdan and "Disco Club 202" in the old synagogue in Zemun. All youth venues had expensive tickets.

However, later in the 1970s, Belgrade began to resemble other world metropolises. Numerous internationally important events developed: theatrical festival BITEF, film festival FEST (1970), musical festival BEMUS, Belgrade jazz festival (1973), Belgrade review of Yugoslav film (1973), etc. Regarding night life, fashion or music, everything was generally toned down from the wild 1960s. Major influence came from the Western Europe, mainly through Italy, and was considered as something modern and advanced. Rock and roll was especially popular.

By the mid-1970s, disco clubs turned into the exclusive venues and the entry fees became too high, though some included a drink. Drinks, in general, also became expensive as various inspection rarely visited the venues, so visitors smuggled alcohol into the clubs. Though the largest crowds were during weekends, the clubs were open during the entire week, usually having only one non-working day, varying from club to club. Working hours mostly didn't extend after 2 a.m. In order to avoid the intent of the authorities to close them, the clubs secured patronage of some state-owned institution, usually a sport society, and were registered as the "restaurants with music". In 1978, a modern caffe bar "Zlatni papagaj" was opened in the Đure Jakšića Street. It was planned as the standing bar for quick drinks, so it had no chairs.

In the late 1970s, a "Dijalog" was opened in Ušće, the first restaurant on the proper boat, as opposed to the later ones opened on the barges. After Slobodan Milošević came to power in the late 1980s, he was interviewed on "Dijalog" by The Times correspondent Dessa Trevisan.

==== Crveno i crno ====
Disco club "Crveno i crno" was opened in 1970, in the Miloša Pocerca Street, in West Vračar. It soon achieved the cult status. The club was opened by Dejan Dodig Džamba, with the assistance of the Youth Organization of Savski Venac. Entry was free, but it lasted only for a season and was closed in 1971. Youth Organization tried to open another disco club on the same location by themselves, but they were unsuccessful.

==== Cepelin ====
In 1971, "Cepelin", the best and the most famous disco in Yugoslavia was opened. Some chroniclers consider it the first proper disco club in Belgrade, open to everyone. It was located at 28 Ilije Garašanina Street, in Tašmajdan. Its opening was described as night life's "excelleration". At the opening night, state and military top officials and members of the diplomatic corps were present. The caviar was served from the Josip Broz Tito's plates. At the peak of its popularity, "Cepelin" had 10,000 members. It had three dance floors, state of the art sound system and the interior was patterned after the famed London club "La Valbonne": floors covered with the black artificial leather, dominant brass ornaments, luxurious booths, plush covered armchairs, twenty different types of mirrors, 1,000 colored lightbulbs, and strobe lights above each dance floor. It also had blacklights, projector which emitted psychedelic music videos on the walls which were mostly black. The rooms were stuffy and the colors of the lights changed depending on the DJ who was working that night. Parts of the walls and furniture were in red, with colorful flower prints.

The most popular persons in the venue included DJ Mister Čupko, and the head-to-toe tattooed main bouncer, nicknamed Oumpah-pah after the comic book character. Đorđe Božović Giška and his entourage were the regulars. The club was located next to the Fifth Gymnasium and sponsored by the Tašmajdan Sports and Recreation Center. It was opened by Saša Nikolić and had working hours of 16:00-21:00 (matinée, for the minors) and 21:00-24:00, for adults, with strict rules on not allowing the minors to stay during the later program. DJs, including Saša Radosavljević and Raša Petrović, were located in the glass booth above the dance podium. It was renovated and expanded in the mid-1970s and included live performances from the most popular Yugoslav rock bands. Most frequent performers were the Korni Grupa. "Cepelin" was closed in 1980. It was closed abruptly, citing renovation. When it was reopened, it was a different venue, renamed to "Taš".

==== Akvarijus ====
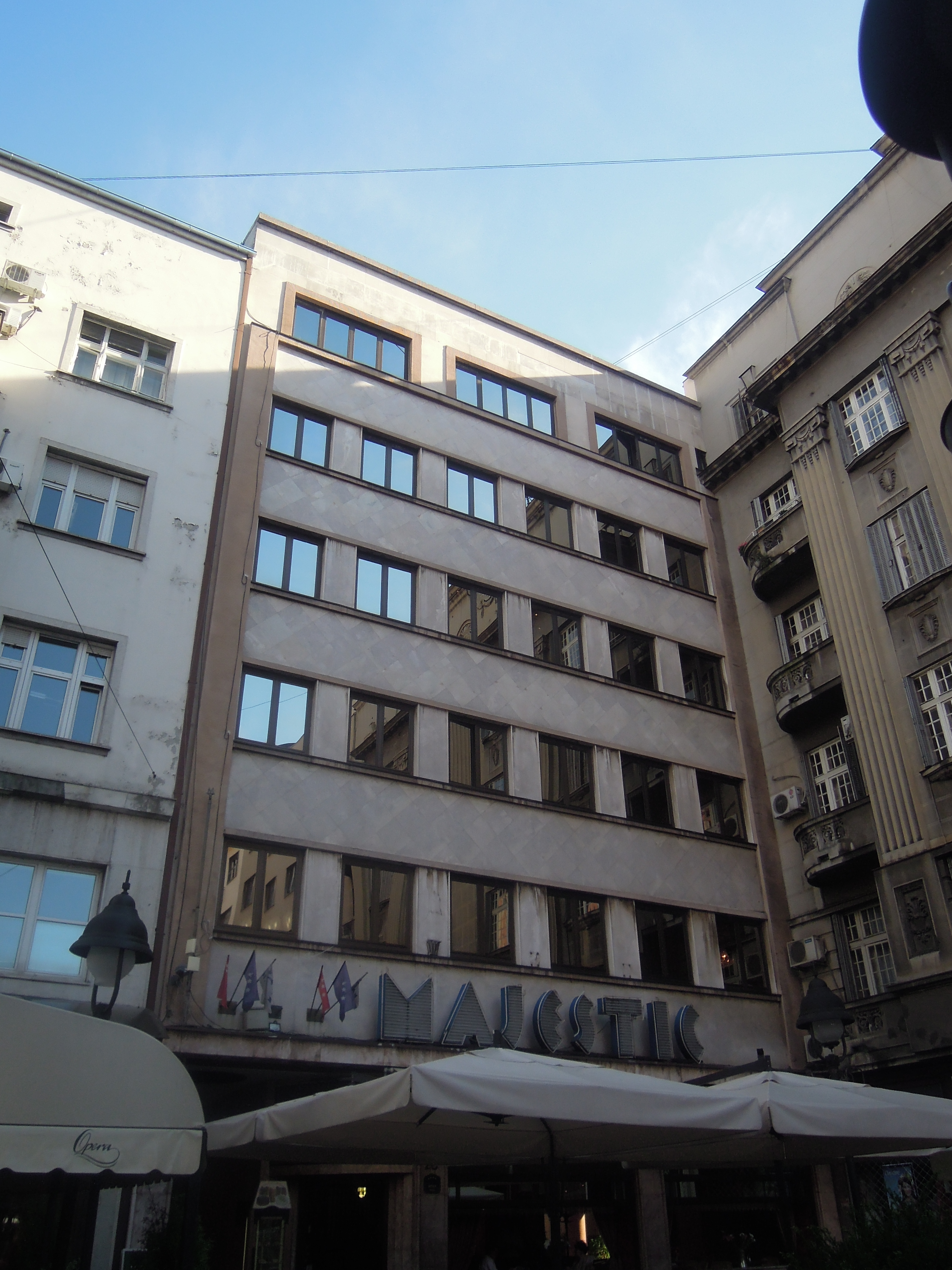
Hotel Mažestik, where the club of the same name was situated

Though "Cepelin" was unrivaled, "Akvarijus" was the only one which could attract some of the "Cepelin" visitors. "Akvarijus" was located at 7 Deligradska Street near the Slavija Square, in the basement of the painter Radovan Trnavac Mića house. It had mostly fancy clientele with deep pockets (šminkeri), consisting of rich lawyers, politicians and athletes. The clientele differed from the other similar venues as the club was attended by the exclusive members of the city elite (sports, film, fashion) and soon became well known outside of Yugoslavia. Music included Bee Gees, Boney M, Éric Charden, Amanda Lear. Once a week, "Akvarijus" was showing animated films.

"Akvarijus" was opened by Dodig in 1972, after he left "Crveno i crno". The club was sponsored by the Radnički Sports Association. Though its name means aquarius, it was actually named after the large aquarium which occupied the central room. As its fashionable visitors mostly had no fixed working hours, so didn't the club: it was open every day, all night. It was small, consisting of three rooms. Central room had a bar, one room was adapted for sitting and third was for dancing. The venue was closed in 1983.

==== Other clubs ====
- "Crveni Pevac"; rock place in Topličin Venac, visited by the bikers.
- "F(ilozof)"; founded in 1975 by the youth organization of the University of Belgrade Faculty of Philosophy in order to gather funds for educational projects. It was a humble venue, opened 20:00-24:00. A musical haven for the hippies, rockers and alternative music lovers, the music included The Doors, Led Zeppelin, etc.
- "Mažestik"'; opened at the same time as the "Cepelin" and also owned by Nikolić. It was opened in the hotel of the same name in Obilićev Venac and was adapted by architect Ilija Gligorijević. It was an exclusive disco club with pricey tickets and a favorite place of šminkeri. Situation later changed. In February 1990, Kristijan Golubović, with Dragan Nikolić Gagi (who was later implicated in the assassination of Željko Ražnatović Arkan), raided the venue, forcing everyone to lay on the ground, firing rapid fire into the ceiling.
- "Monokl"; opened in bohemian Skadarlija, across the kafana "Tri šešira". Silvana Armenulić performed at the opening. DJ was Maksa Ćatović, previously a disc jockey in "Cepelin".
- "Resnik"; opened in the suburb of Resnik, in the former adult movie theater which was closed by the authorities. It wasn't much attended as it was distant from downtown.

=== Rebel 1980s ===
By this time, DJ's became stars in their own right. The most popular was Zoran Modli.

==== Akademija ====
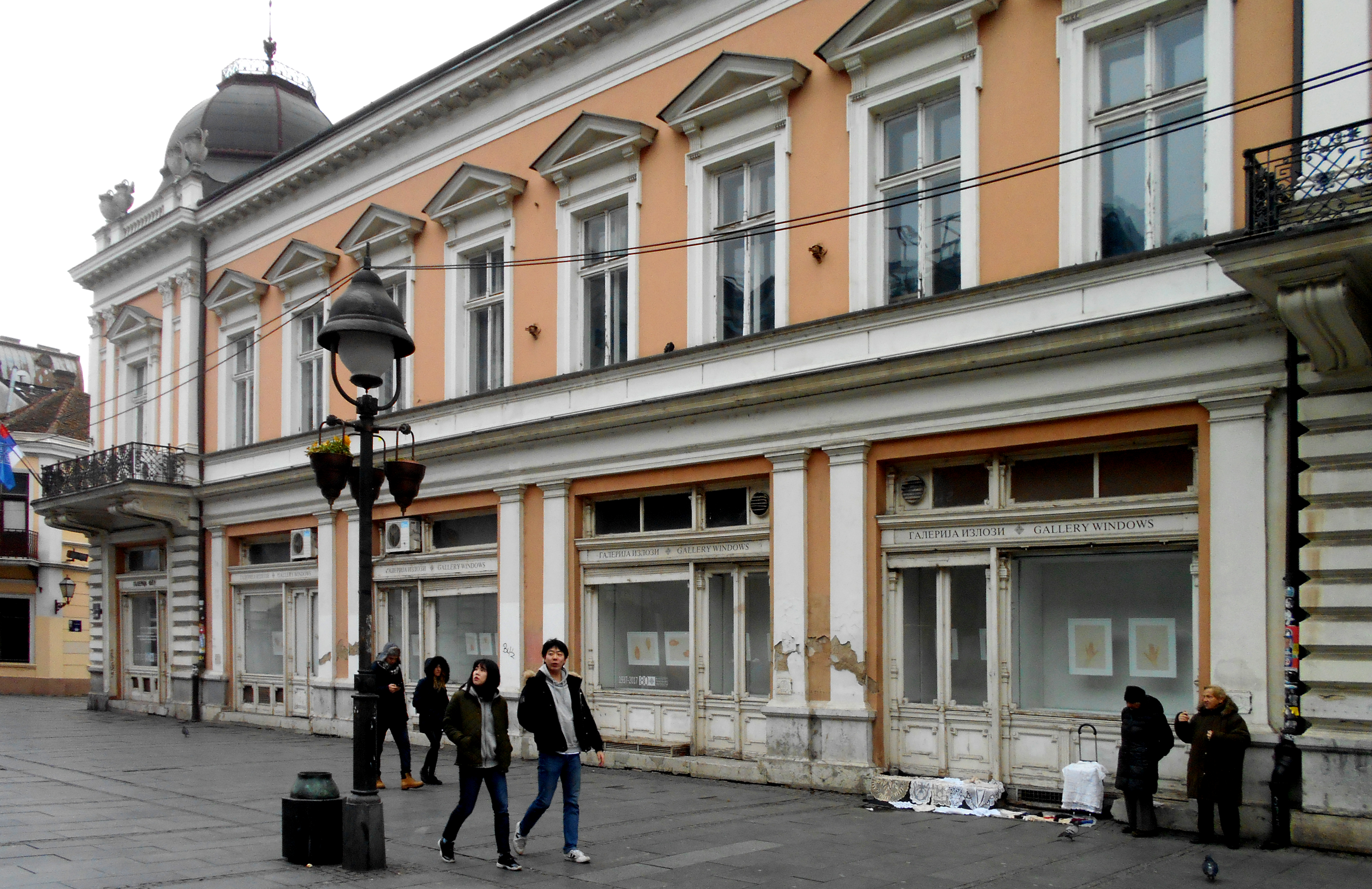
Building in which the famed club Akademija was located 1981–2011

At the end of 1981, "Akademija" club, one of the most famous and influential in Belgrade, was opened at 53 Knez Mihailova Street, in the dark basement of the Gallery of the Painting Academy, hence the name. It was a rock and roll venue, a meeting place of the rockers, artists, politicians' children, young and avant-garde rebels, etc. The original line-up of Ekaterina Velika gathered here (Milan Mladenović, Margita Stefanović, Bojan Pečar). Other musicians who performed included Električni Orgazam, Partibrejkers, Psihomodo Pop, Toni Montano, etc. Visitors of the elite discos avoided it completely as it was considered a "hole which shocks and provokes". "Akademija" was an important part in the growing up and maturing of generations to come and survived until 2011, when it was finally closed,. Despite the public protests, petitions and online activism from the fans and the celebrities, city refused to help with the situation and the debt-collectors closed the venue.

"Akademija" is described today as a "separate state" during the 1980s, and "city phenomenon", West-oriented, which forged a new culture of having fun, influenced by the unique concerts on the stage which was right next to the audience. With the neighboring "Zvezda", it was the main gathering point of the Belgrade youth of the decade. They are described as meeting point of two Belgrades - one, which smelled on beer, tobacco and marijuana, and the one with fragrances of the Western perfumes and Italian leather shoes. It was inconceivable at the time that one person would visit both venues.

==== Zvezda ====
Rivaling club "Zvezda" was opposed to "Akademija" in every way, including the location: it was right across, at 51 Knez Mihailova Street, at the back entrance into the basement of the Grčka Kraljica restaurant. Opened in 1983, it became the symbol of the fanciness, with diametrically opposite interiors, music and general concept from "Akademija". In order to get a membership card for "Zvezda", people needed political and other connections, but the best pass was a modern and attractive look. This included expensive imported perfumes and wardrobe. Rivaling clubs were so different, that just by someone's attire, you might guess where they will enter. After "Zvezda" was closed, another club, called "Bassement" was opened instead in the 2000s, but that club was later closed, too.

==== Duga ====
Club "Duga" was located at 5 Sredačka Street. It was patterned after the wishes of the rich and opened with an idea to gather the rich and famous, pretty girls and show-business stars. It soon achieved a status of the "club for the famous". "Duga" was opened in 1981 in Zvezdara. It was the most exclusive venue in its time. The club was a rearranged basement of the private house and over 200,000 Deutsche Marks were spent on the adaptation which was work of architect Ilija Gligorijević. It was said that an average, rich customer would "spend per night as much as a factory worker earns in a year". However, one visitor ignored the fanciful dress code and artificial manners: legendary actor Zoran Radmilović, who lived in the vicinity, would regularly come in slippers for a coffee.

==== JAT ====
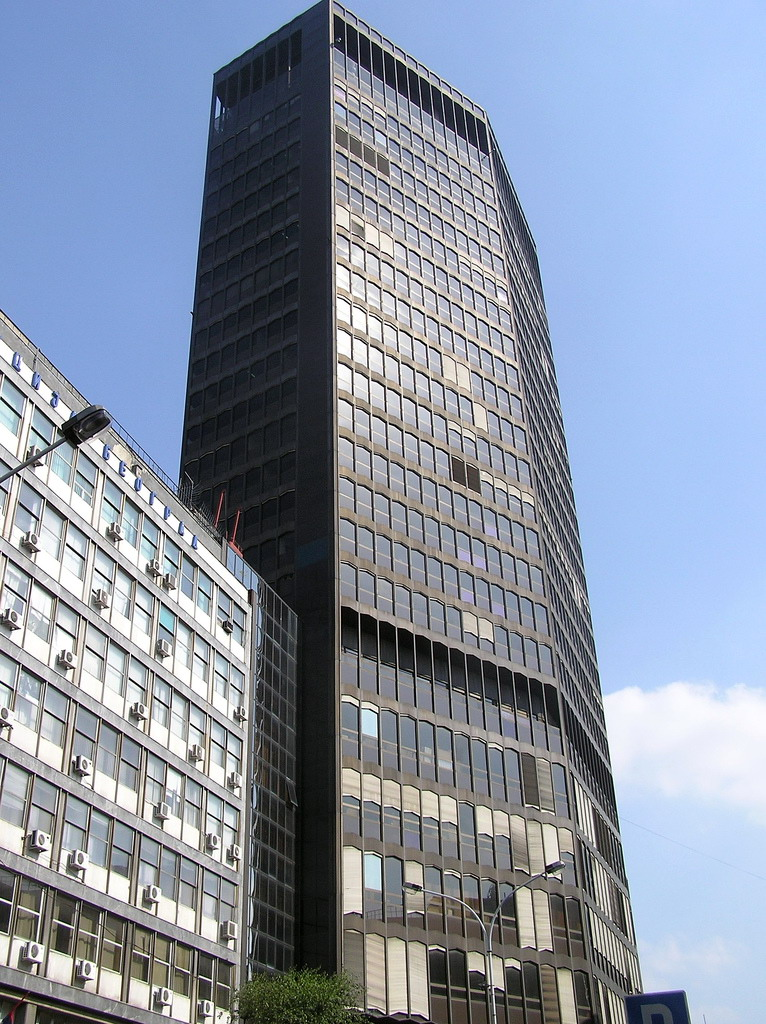
Beograđanka skyscraper. Club "Šestica" was on the 6th floor

One of the first barges, opened in the late 1970s. It was originally intended only for the employees of the JAT Airways, but soon became a gathering place for the regular clientele, becoming a famous venue in the city. It was derelict by the 2000s, when it was sold to a private owner. Before it was renovated, the barge detached and was taken by the river downstream. The owner took emergency measures to keep it afloat, but in January 2019 it sank under the heavy snowfall. The river barge itself was considered one of the best, produced in Smederevo.

==== Other clubs ====
In the mid-1980s, an expansion of new disco clubs began. Best known were:

- "Bezistan", in Terazije, in the basement of the venue later adapted into the McDonald restaurant which survived until today. Bezistan was different from other discos of the era and was the only "dancing club" in the city. When the popularity of the Italo disco reached Belgrade, Bezistan organized dance competitions for participant from the entire Yugoslavia. Band Zana was promoted here, while band Aska practiced choreography for their performance at the Eurovision Song Contest 1982. Bezistan was closed in 1989.
- "Bona fides", founded by the students of the University of Belgrade Faculty of Law.
- "Crveni podijum", in Kalemegdan; In the mid-1980s, it was advertised as the "largest open air disco in the Balkans" as there were up to 10,000 visitors on some nights.
- "Cvetni Breg", in Resnik.
- "London", in the neighborhood of the same name.
- "Panorama", in Košutnjak.
- "Šestica", on the 6th floor of the Beograđanka building in downtown Belgrade, hence the name [The Six]; It worked from 20:00 to 24:00 and though operational for only three years, it was quite popular as it provided patrons with an excellent view of the city. It was the only club at the time that was not located in an adapted utility room or a basement. Still, though it occupied almost the entire floor, it was notorious for stuffiness, as the highrise's windows couldn't open.
- "Taš", replaced "Cepelin"; It had the so-called "Chivas booths", which introduced whiskey as a symbol of prestige in the Belgrade's night life. Knez worked as a DJ in Taš, before he became a popular singer. With "Duga" and "Nana" made the famous "triangle" of Belgrade's night life in the 1980s.

The 1980s saw the origins of the splavovi, which will experience a full expansion later in the 1990s:

- "Argument", the first restaurant on splav. Opened in 1983 on Ada Ciganlija, it looked like a "railroad car", without any specificities. In the 1990s it was relocated to Ušće. It was later renamed and refurbished, but is still located there. Hence, many city chroniclers take 1983 as the year the splavovi were born.
- "Hua Hua", also opened in 1983, close to the northern tip of Ada Ciganlija. It was the most popular splav in the 1980s. The venue was sold in 2013.
- "Savski Galeb", originally opened in 1987, it was the first such facility on the Sava Quay, in Blokovi. It was actually an adapted old freight barge.

=== Criminal 1990s ===
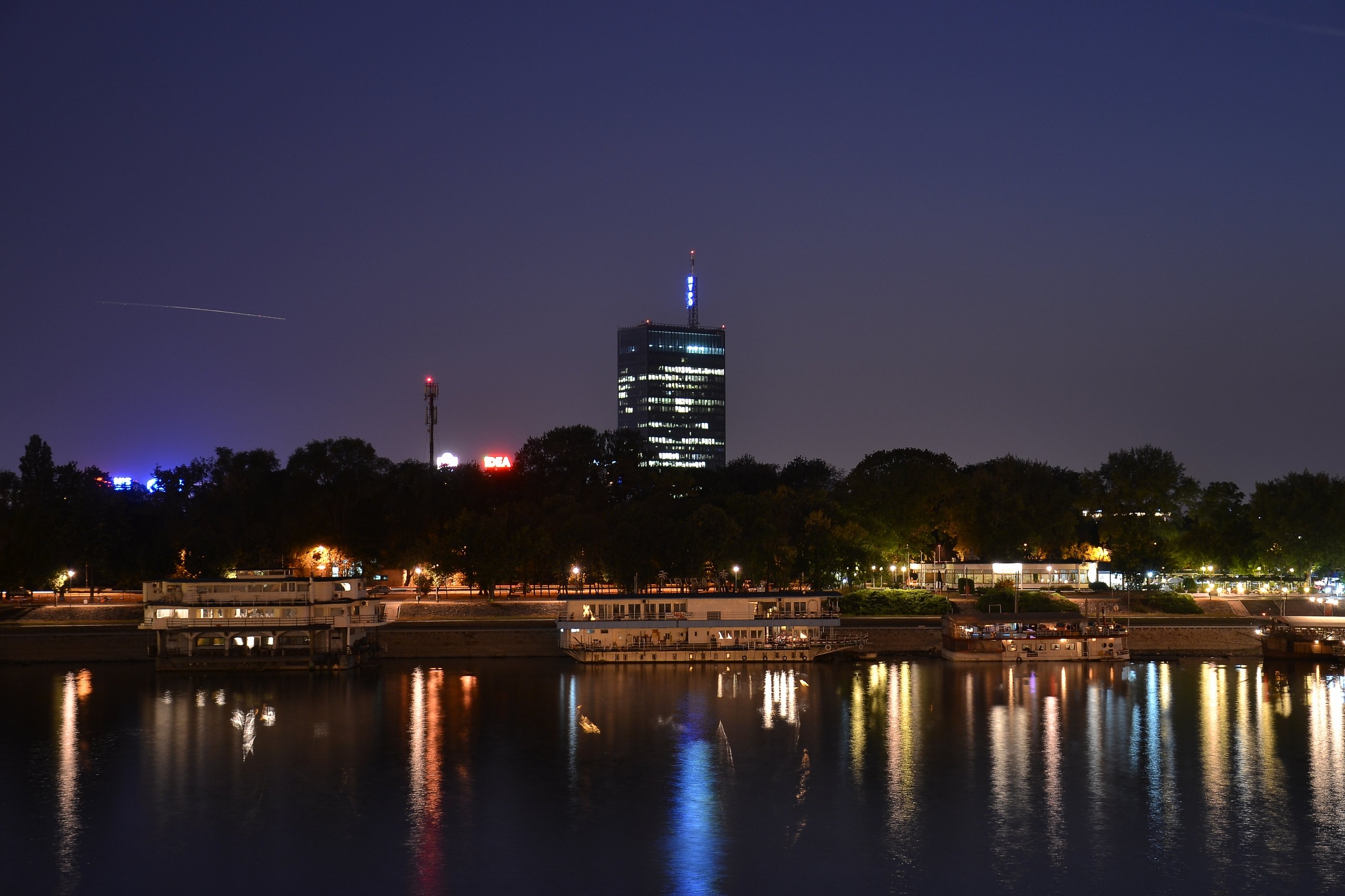
Splavovi or barge clubs in the neighborhood of Ušće

The 1990s in Serbia were marked with calamities: break-up of Yugoslavia, wars, economic sanctions, collapse of the standard of living. Criminals began occupying the clubs and night life in general. Fashion and aesthetics of the turbo-folk became a norm while shootings and killings in disco clubs became regular events. Turbulent period was marked by the shootouts, murders and executions, often in the popular city clubs. Visiting these venues was a high risk.

Disco clubs lost the top position in night fun, as young people turned to the folkotheques (disco clubs with turbo-folk music) and splavovi, or barge-clubs. Among the most popular barges were "Lukas", where singer Aca Lukas started his folk career, assuming the splav's name as his own alias, "Mozzart" (which sank after 2000) and "Triton". By the time the 1990s ended, the splavovi almost completely covered the banks of the Sava and spread into the Danube. First splavovi open for visitors originated in the late 1970s and the first restaurant, named "Argument", was opened in 1983. Barge "Blek Pantersi", former "Kalipso" in the 1980s, owned by the music bend of the same name, was opened in 1990. It was popular until it burned in 2008. The splavovi experienced a boom after 1991 and by the 2010s spread for almost 15 km (9.3 mi) along the Sava. As of today, they remain publicly connected with criminals and numerous incidents. By 2021, there were over 200 cafes, restaurants, kafanas and discos on the barges.

From the summer of 1996, the splavovi from Ušće spread along the bank of Staro Sajmište, too. The barges in Staro Sajmište were the first where "urban" splavovi appeared and the entire sub-culture originating in the venues became mainstream. This barges had "historical importance" for the expansion and acceptance of the venues as an authentic part of the Belgrade's nightlife and tourist offering. However, the constant public conflict between the cheap fun and criminal on the barges, and the solemnity of the neighborhood given its war history as a Sajmište concentration camp, continued for decades. Ultimately, all barges were moved out of Staro Sajmište by the late 2010s.

Second half of the 1990s saw a development of electronic music venues so as a techno and rave scene with international DJs, despite the international sanctions. A strict division developed, with folk venues on the one, and underground, alternative techno clubs on the other side, with the mainstream rock music almost disappearing.

==== Estrada ====
The splav opened in 1988 on the Sava Quay under the name "Pingvin", which was soon changed. The first purposely built barge-discotheque, it was a blueprint for all the future venues of this type. It was the first barge with a DJ, and a separated dance floor and booths for sitting. It was well visited since the opening, but the clientele changed in time. Originally, it was made from the "roamers" from all over the city, but with the general criminalization of the society, it became the gathering point for the members of the criminal clans from Zemun and New Belgrade.

==== Nana ====
Main rival of Duga", at 3-a Koste Glavinića Street in Senjak. Originally, it was known as an elegant little nightclub with a more urban and sophisticated atmosphere than "Duga". During its "sophisticated" days, "Nana" was known for not playing folk music. Before the criminals began to gather in it, for a while it was a favorite place of the foreign diplomats as many have residences in Senjak. A venue which had a dress code (obligatory suit since 1987), it was "discovered" by the criminals, who began to gather, organizing in local clans. It gained the notoriety of being the first club in which the murder occurred: Andrija Lakonić Laki, unofficially claimed by many to be a police snitch, was murdered in "Nana" on 24 March 1990. The murder revealed connections between the criminals and the secret police. Darko Ašanin and Vesko Vukotić were accused. The trial dragged on, with many criminals and policemen appearing, including the inspector Miroslav Bižić, who was accused of hiding the evidence and helping Vukotić to flee the country. The case was never closed. Bižić, who left the police, was assassinated in 1996, while Ašanin was murdered in June 1998. These crimes also remained unsolved.

The club was closed and later reopened but became a "place to be avoided". On 17 December 2017, Aleksandar Savković, member of the FK Rad's supporter group, was killed in front of the club and another person was wounded.

==== Lukas ====
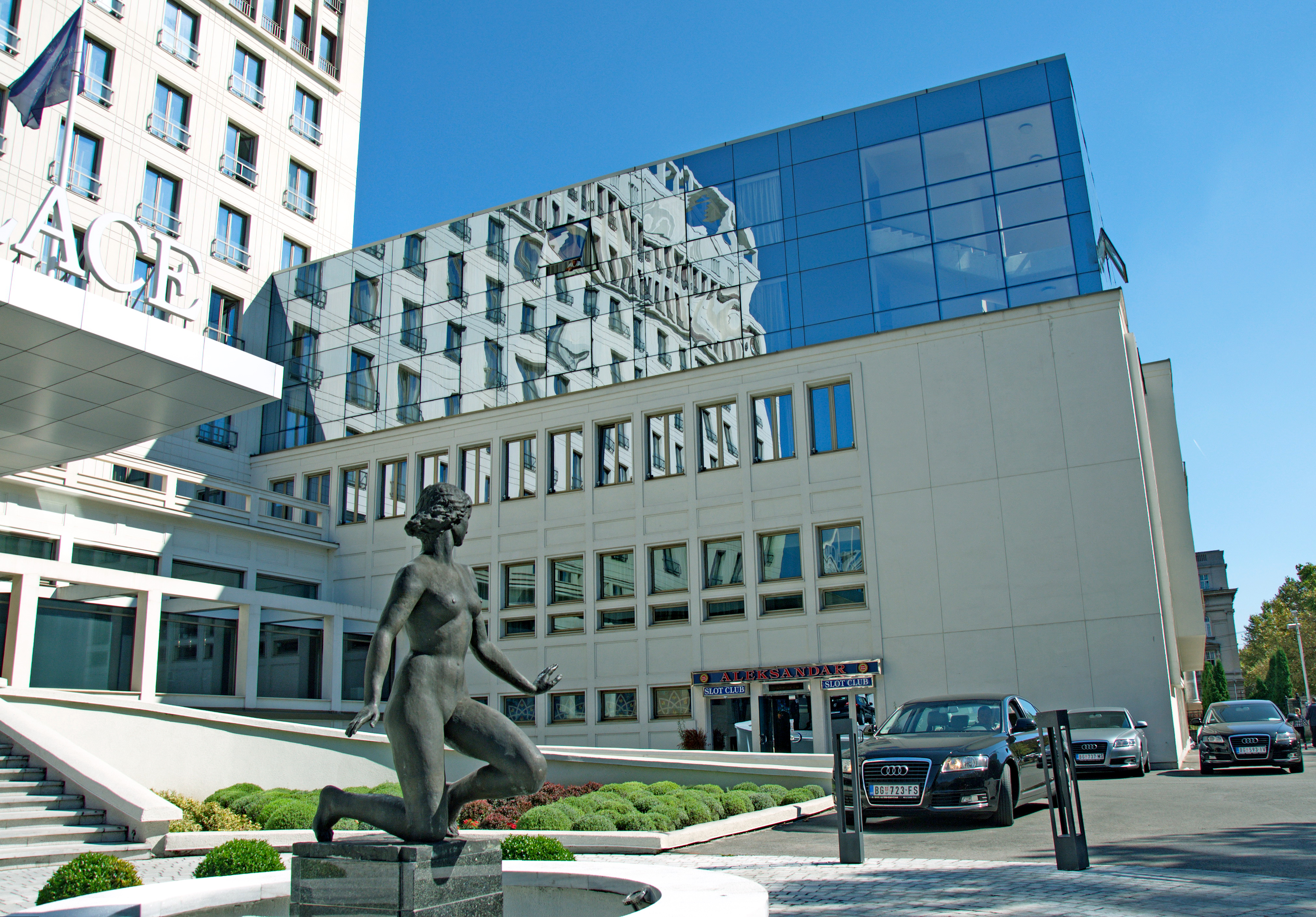
Hotel Metropol, location of the club "Sunset"

Though opened in 1985, its fame rests in the 1990s. It was located on the left bank of the Savar, in Ušće. By the mid-1990s it became extremely popular and became gathering place for the members of two criminal clans, Voždovac and Zvezdara. On 27 November 1994 there was a major shootout, which included the river police. Several clan members were wounded, while Bojan Banović, member of the Voždovac clan was killed. Shootings continued in the times to come. As of 2017, a splav with a different name is on the location. One of the first to play turbo-folk music, the "Lukas" has been described as the "monument to the 1990s".

==== Sunset ====
The club was located in the Hotel Metropol, at 69 Bulevar Kralja Aleksandra. Miroslav Kurak, a participant in the assassination of a journalist Slavko Ćuruvija in 1999, was a co-owner. The club was known for its mixed clientele: businessmen, members of the diplomatic corps but also numerous gangsters, including Rade Ćaldović Ćenta and Milorad Ulemek Legija, later convicted of the assassination of Serbian Prime Minister Zoran Đinđić. Employees of the club used the last floor in the hotel. In 2002, police raided the premises and discovered huge amount of guns. Several days later, a fire broke out on this floor, officially due to the bad wiring.

==== Industrija ====
The most popular techno rave club. It was located at 19 Vasina Street and played only electronic music. Described as a place with "numerous fairytales, myths and truths" told about it. The venue later hosted the "Ilegala" café, while today it is a bakery. "Industrija" is described as "writing the history of the Serbian electronic scene" and the "place where everything started". It was opened in 1994 in the former boiler room of the Philosophy Faculty. DJs of the developing electronic music included Deki S.T.R.O.B., Mark Wee, Vlada Eye, Velja Innvision, Gordan Paunović, Vlada Janjić, Boža Podunavac, X-periment, TTP, Sugardaddy O. Despite international sanctions imposed on Serbia at the time, foreign DJs performed 2-3 times a month, including Moby, Mark EG and DJ Hell.

==== Underground ====
Barney York at Industrija on 6 May 1995

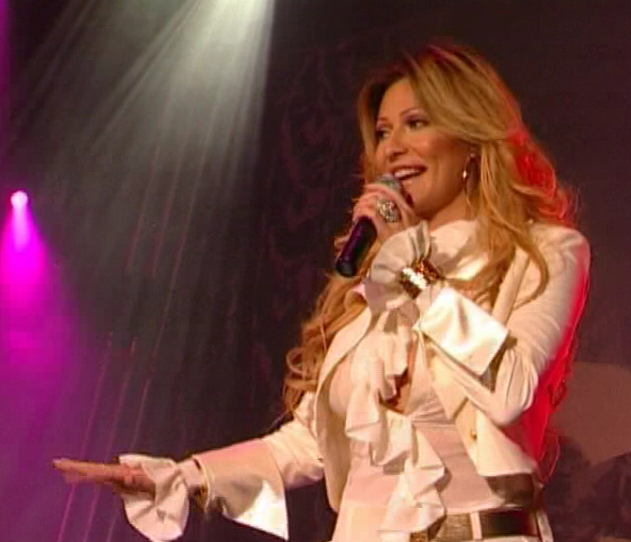
Opposed to the alternative scene was the enormously popular turbo-folk, a major figure being Svetlana Ceca Ražnatović. Her private life, with connections to criminal, mirrored the social paradigm of the era, further boosting her popularity

Located in the cave below the Belgrade Fortress, it was known for the specific type of music: acid jazz, funk, drum and house. It enjoyed a cult status for years but after the change of proprietors, the choice of music also changed and the club began playing folk music. It was closed later.

==== Other clubs ====
- "Apartman", at 43 Karađorđeva Street, today closed.
- "Batler" and "Francuska Sobarica", both located at 12 Francuska Street.
- "Bordel", today "Meduza Club", at 6 Gospodar Jevermova Street.
- "Buha", in the building of the Boško Buha Theatre on the Republic Square. Popular in the 1990-1992 period, one of the first to play electronic music. Also a pioneer of rave music in Serbia.
- "Bus", in Tašmajdan, close to the Tašmajdan stadium. It was located in a small edifice which extended from the real derelict bus which was later removed to make a room for the parking lot.
- "Dolar", at the corner of 29 Novembra and Takovska streets, in the partly derelict shopping mall. More of a bar than a dancing club, it was known for the Pazi Škola evening, which later developed into the separate club with that name.
- "Energija", at 8 Nušičeva Street, known for the Trashotheque nights, every Thursday.
- "Inkognito", at 4 Nemanjina Street. In the 2000s replaced with the "Wash" club, which had a DJ's mixing console in the shape of the washing machine, while the walls were decorated with empty bottles of fabric softeners. Opened 7 days a week, it brought well known European DJs, and was one of the major points in the development of the clubbing in Belgrade.
- "Gajba", at 71 Kneginje Zorke Street, today a "Monk's Bar". Known for its Funkyšljiva evenings.
- "Kuća", in Savamala, at 5 Braće Krsmanovića Street. A dance club, reached through the door with a big gearwheel and the pink tunnel. Second floor was adapted into the lounge. The entire "clubbing entourage" of Belgrade visited here. It was closed in the early 2000s.
- "Lale Happy People", actually a gift-shop in the Block 45 in New Belgrade, at the very edge of the city. Electronic music was mixed by Lale Happy People, the owner, DJ Marko Nastić, Srđan Todorović, Goran Zmix Kovačević, Petko.
- "Luv", in Braće Jerković, at 74-B Braće Jerković Street. Originally a place for šminkeri, it became a gathering place of the criminals (euphemistically referred to as the "tough guys"). Some of Belgrade's best-known gangsters, like Aleksandar Knežević Knele or Kristijan Golubović, had showdowns here.
- "Magna House", at 9 Dragoslava Jovanovića Street, since 1998 restaurant "Gradonačelnik".
- "Omen", techno rave club, located at 16 Obilićev Venac Street. Especially popular among the DJs, it was a small venue with intimate atmosphere. It had pinball machines at the entrance.
- "Pećina", situated at the entry into the Tašmajdan's lagums beneath the park. Location of the "Ovo je moj grad" festival.
- "Sara", a barge on Ada Ciganlija, the very first venue with solely electronic music. It was opened only for a year in 1994.
- "Soul Food", at 6 Francuska Street, usually labeled as the "first club with strictly defined concept, shaped by the dance music". It was closed in 1997 when the clientele mostly moved to "Industrija". All the pioneers of the city's clubbing scene gathered here: DJs Vlada Janjić, Boža Podunavac, Gordan Paunović, Vlada Eye, Mark Wee, Deki S.T.R.O.B., etc. Another disco, with completely different musical direction was open later, named "F6" and later "Dot".
- "Triton", splav, one of the most popular at the time. It was a large venue, which originally functioned as a "disco on the water". It was a location of numerous shootouts.
- "Trozubac", located between the city's central square Terazije and Nušićeva Street. A gathering place of the criminals.
- "Tube", corner of the Simina and Dobračina streets.
