= Small Staircase in Kalemegdan Park =

Staircase in Belgrade, Serbia

Coordinates: 44°49′8.75″N 20°27′6.05″E

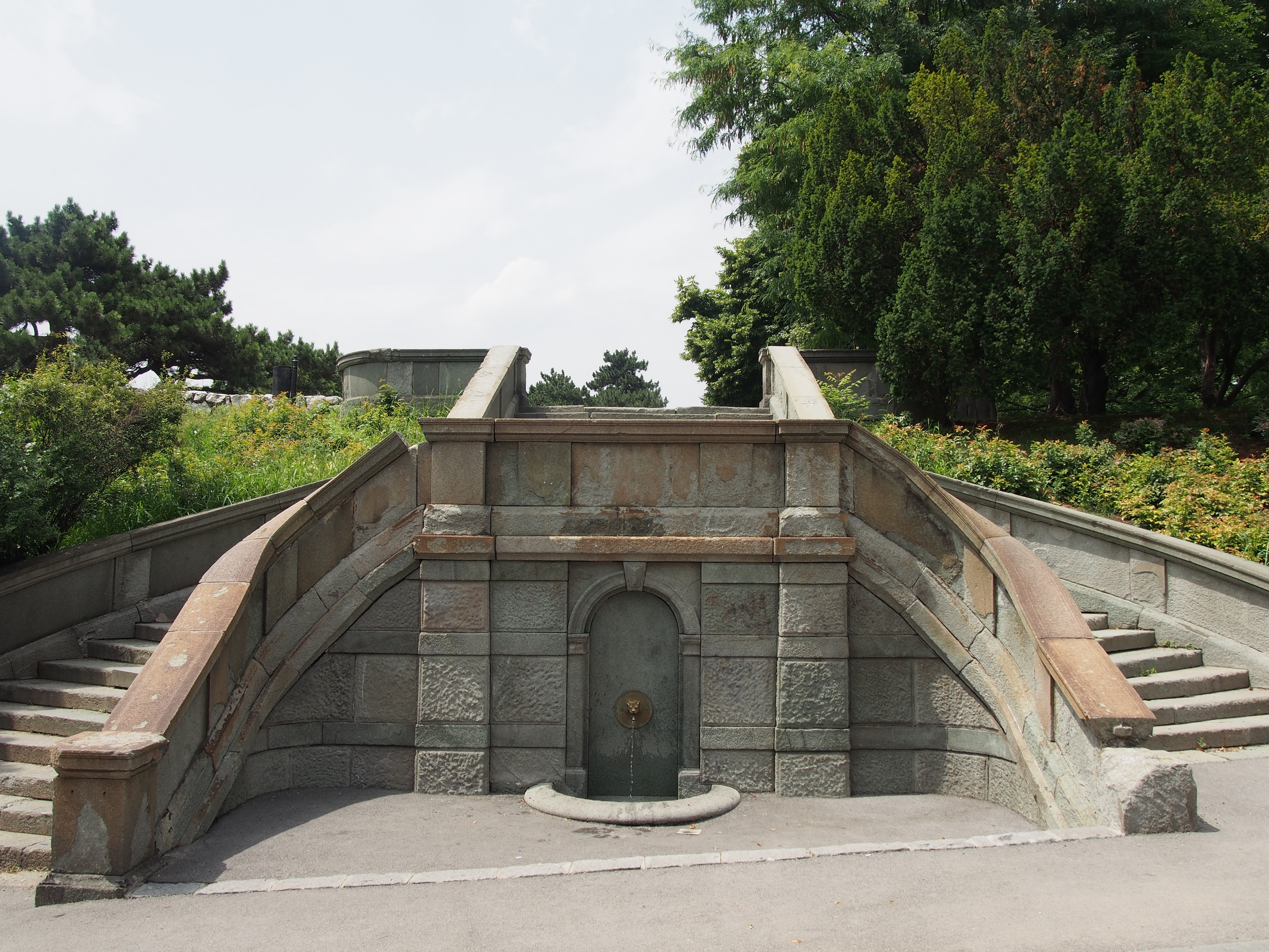
View from the Pariska Street

The Small Staircase in Kalemegdan Park (Serbian: Мало степениште у Калемегданском парку, romanized: Malo stepenište u Kalemegdanskom parku) is a staircase at one of the entrances into Kalemegdan Park in downtown Belgrade, Serbia. It is a representative of the park architecture and integral part of the park's promenade above the Sava river. It is part of the Belgrade Fortress complex, which is placed under the state protection as the Cultural Monuments of Exceptional Importance and the staircase itself is described as having both the architectural-urban and the cultural-historical values.

== Location ==
The staircase is located in the southernmost extension of Kalemegdan's section of Great Kalemegdan Park, near the turn of the Pariska Street (Serbian: Париска улица / Pariska ulica), which circles around this section of the park. It connects the park's Sava Promenade, and further into the Belgrade Fortress, with the Pariska Street and the urban tissue of Belgrade. Right across the street is a monumental building of the French Embassy. In the vicinity of the staircase are the Cathedral Church, Building of the Patriarchate and the King Petar I Elementary School.

== Characteristics ==
It was built in 1903 after the design of the first female architect in Serbia, Jelisaveta Načić. The object was constructed in the style of academism, and as the main model, neo-Baroque manner was applied. Levelling between the Sava Promenade and Pariska Street was done by constructing the bifurcated arched staircase with the ramps blending in the central platform, from which one staircase ramp prolongs towards the Sava Promenade. The facade facing Pariska Street is decorated with the drinking fountain in the shape of a lion's head placed in the arched niche decorated with shallow pilasters. The railing is built in the massive form with shallow pilasters, as decoration. The stone was used as the main material. The staircase represents the integral part of the decoration of the Great Kalemegdan Park, resembling the city parks of European metropolis in the late 19th and early 20th century, bearing the features of the representative city park fin de siècle.

== 2017–2018 reconstruction ==
The staircase is covered with the greenish granite, kersantite, from the now closed Tešićev Majdan (Serbian Cyrillic: Тошићев мајдан, "Tešić Quarry") in Ripanj, on the southern slopes of Avala. As the staircase deteriorated in time, city government in 2011 drafted a restoration project, but the problem was that the quarry is closed before 1960 and it is the only known location of kersantite in Serbia. For decades, kersantite was used for the Belgrade buildings, including some of the most representative ones: the fountain between the Novi Dvor and Stari Dvor, bordure of the Hotel Bristol, pedestal of the Play of Black Horses statues in front of the House of the National Assembly of Serbia and buildings of Belgrade Cooperative, Elementary School King Petar I, Cathedral Church of St. Michael the Archangel and Main Post Office Building. City government announced in 2012 that it will unilaterally explore the pit until it gets reopened and inspected it in 2013. After the political change in Belgrade in the late 2013, the motion was dropped and the Small Staircase wasn't renovated.

The staircase was also damaged in 1999 during the NATO bombing of Yugoslavia. The statics of the stairs was excluded during the previous reconstructions and they further deteriorated as the entire slope is actually a mass wasting area. As of 2017 the staircase was in a very bad shape and the reconstruction began on 21 November 2017. The stairs were consolidated, statics improved, damaged and missing parts replaced with the original stones and the overall authentic form of the staircase was reestablished as it was partially covered with the asphalt concrete. Deadline was set for June 2018, but was extended to August because of the remains of the original kaldrma cobblestone which was discovered beneath the asphalt. Almost perfectly preserved under the 0.5 m (1 ft 8 in) of asphalt, the kaldrma was repaired and refilled. Also discovered below was a section of the original sidewalk, made of kersantite, just like the staircase itself. Although the Tešić Quarry remained nonoperational, enough stone was stored in the quarry before it was closed.
