= Kosančićev Venac =

Kosančićev Venac Косанчићев Венац
- Urban neighbourhood
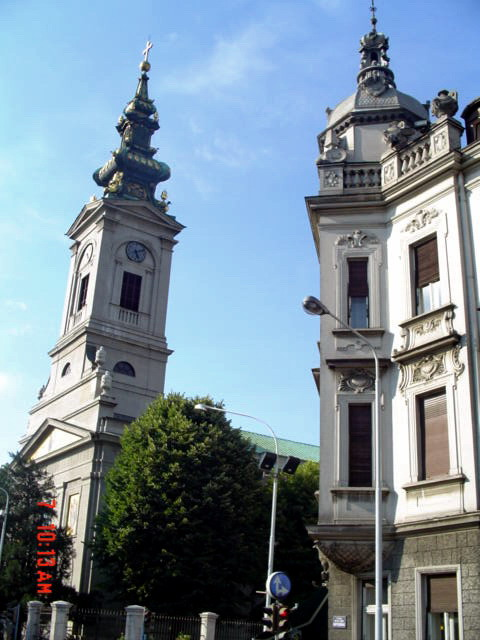
- Cathedral of Saint Archangel Michael

- Location within Belgrade
- Coordinates: 44.8175°N 20.4514°E
- Country: Serbia
- Region: Belgrade
- Municipality: Stari Grad
- Time zone: UTC+1 (CET)
  - Summer (DST): UTC+2 (CEST)
- Area code: +381(0)11
- Car plates: BG

Kosančićev Venac (Serbian Cyrillic: Косанчићев Венац) is an urban neighborhood of Belgrade, the capital of Serbia. It is located in Belgrade's municipality of Stari Grad. It has been described as the most valuable and most representative veduta of Belgrade. In 1971, it was declared a spatial cultural-historical unit and placed under legal protection.

== Location ==
Kosančićev Venac is located along the elbow-shaped street of the same name, 700 m (2,300 ft) west of downtown Belgrade (Terazije). It developed on the western edge of the ending section of the ridge of the Šumadija geological bar, which extends from Terazijska Terasa via Obilićev Venac to Kalemegdan, which is a continuation of Kosančićev Venac and overlooks the Sava port on the Sava river, the northernmost section of the neighborhood of Savamala. On its southeast side, it borders the neighborhood of Zeleni Venac.

== History ==
=== Antiquity ===
The Celtic and Roman Castrum occupied part of today's Belgrade Fortress. The civilian zone spread from the Kralja Petra Street, over both the Sava and Danube slopes until Kosančićev Venac, extending in a series of necropolises from Republic Square along the Bulevar kralja Aleksandra to Mali Mokri Lug.

The modern neighborhood is built on the location of an Singidunum's southwestern necropolis dating from the 3rd century, spreading over Zeleni Venac, Kosančićev Venac and Varoš Kapija. The remains were discovered during the construction works in the 1930s when the Brankova Street was extended to the Sava river, to make a connection to the future King Alexander Bridge. At 16 Brankova Street a Roman tomb was discovered in 1931, with ceramics and coins from the period of emperors Aurelian and Claudius Gothicus. The grave was made from the reused parts of stele. The sandstone plaque had a niche with a human bust and an inscription by Valerius Longinus for his son, veteran Valerius Maximinus. There was another tombstone, crushed into pieces, dedicated to Maximinus' wife. Several other well preserved graves were discovered in the direction of Pop Lukina and Karađorđeva streets. There are also remains of a luxurious villa, with the floor, mosaic, and walls decorated in frescoes.

=== 18th century ===
During Austrian occupation of northern Serbia 1717-1739, Belgrade was divided by the governing Austrian authorities on 6 districts: Fortress, (Upper) Serbian Town (modern Kosančićev Venac), German Town (modern Dorćol), Lower Serbian Town (Savamala), Karlstadt (Palilula) and the Great Military Hospital (Terazije-Tašmajdan).

German settlers asked the Austrian emperor to allow only for the German Catholics to settle in German Town and to expel 40 Serbian families who already lived there. They also asked for the expulsion or relocation into ghettos of all Serbians, Armenians, Greeks and Jews who were present in the area before the Austrians came. Germans openly stated that local population, which lived there during the Ottoman period, moved into the largest and most beautiful Turkish houses, which Germans wanted for themselves. Emperor Charles VI granted almost the same rights to both towns, but on the pretext that they are fully separate. Statute of German Town stipulated that "Serbs, Armenians and Greeks" would only be tolerated only in separate municipalities. Non-German nationalities were completely expelled from German Town in 1726, when some estates were bought off, but the majority of people were relocated forcefully by the Austrian gendarmerie colonel Von Burg. By the end of their rule, there were massive differences between two parts of Belgrade, as the Austrians made no effort at all to cultivate Serbian Town which remained Oriental settlement, while German Town grew larger, both in area and population. New palaces, squares and streets were built, and the fortress was reconstructed.

Upper Serbian Town was centered around the Church of Saint Archistrategos Michael, where the modern Cathedral Church is located, dedicated to the same saint. The church was built from stone with a large dome, but without a cross on top of it. It was damaged during the Austrian conquest of Belgrade in 1717. Austrian authorities banned reconstructions and renovations of the damaged and demolished Serbian churches, so Metropolitan Mojsije Petrović asked the Russian emperor Peter the Great to help with Austrian officials, but to no avail. The church had to be demolished in 1728, so Petrović began to rebuild it without Austrian permission in 1725 with the addition of the Metropolis see next to it. Finished in 1730, the see was among the first buildings in Serbian Town designed after the German influence which spread from the neighboring German Town.

The new episcopal seat also administered profane issues in the city, so it became known as the "Obšči dom" ("general office"). The residence was lush, with luxurious salons and over 40 rooms. It also had a garden, fish pond, and luxurious furniture and furnaces for glazed pottery, imported from Austria. On the rocky slope above the modern Karađorđeva Street, Metropolitan Mojsije started digging a wine cellar. Expansion continued into the 20th century, creating one of the largest underground complexes in Belgrade. The above-ground complex was finished by the Mojsije's heir, metropolitan Vikentije Jovanović.

As few other "European-style" buildings were built around the church, most respectful and wealthy class Serbians moved into the area surrounding it. Germans listed numerous artisans in their part of Belgrade, but in Serbian Town they named only two, both sellers' types: merchants (those who had no shops or stalls) and bakals (those who had [grocery] stores). They were grouped in several centers in town and variously nicknamed, generally after the Sava river (savalije) to distinguish them from the German Town merchants, which gravitated to the Danube, or more specifically after the khans where they gathered (čukurhanlije, jenihanlije). Slowly, Serbian merchants took over the export-import routes to Belgrade and a dozen of merchant families became quite wealthy in the process. They were the core of the higher class of Belgrade society, which hadn't previously existed in the Ottoman period.

During the Austrian occupation, "Serbian" Belgrade grew to 5,000 inhabitants. Austrians didn't intervene and demolish the church and the Metropolis building, but after regaining Belgrade in 1739, the Ottomans demolished them both.

=== Modern period ===
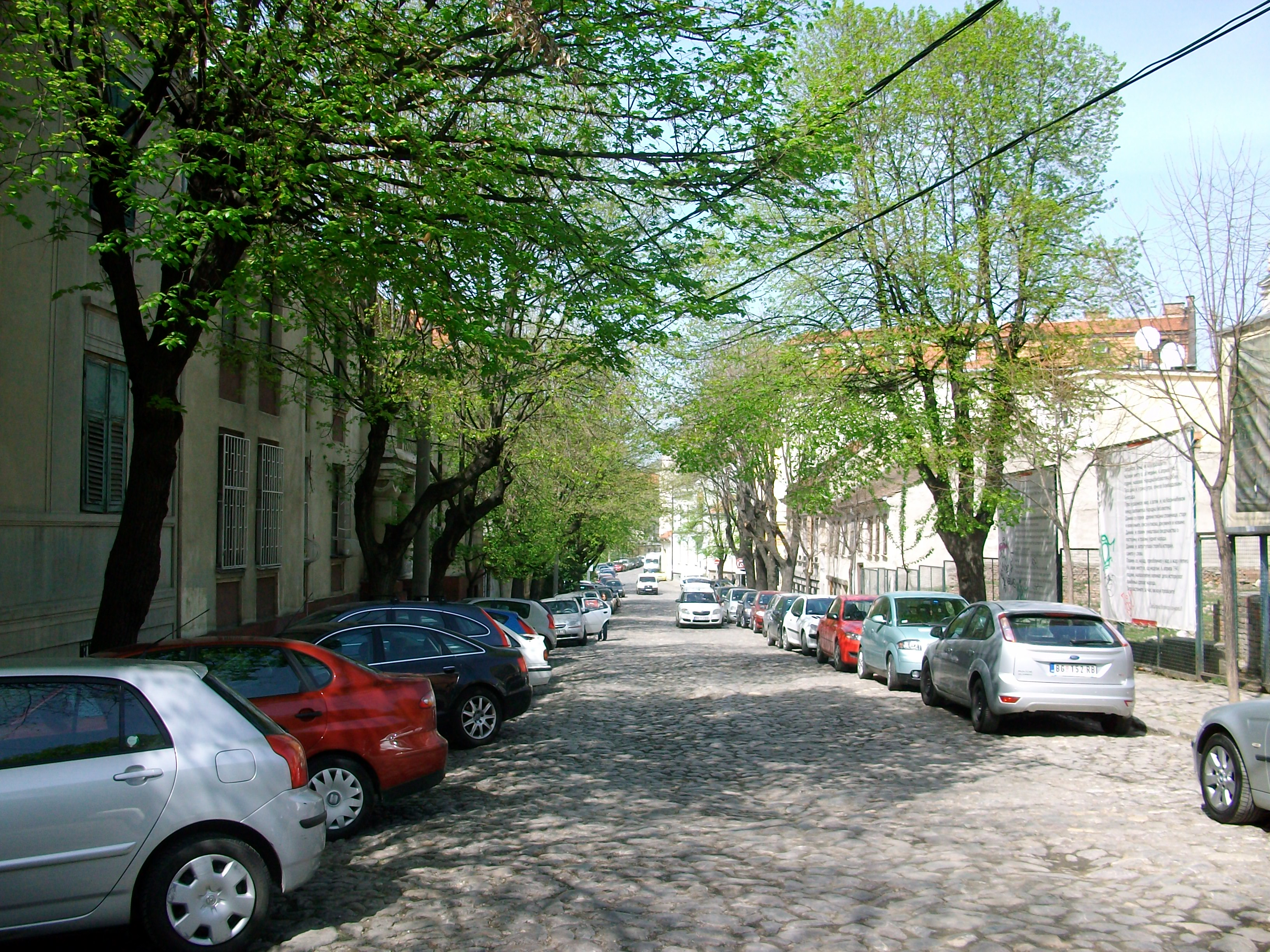
Kosančićev Venac street with its typical kaldrma cobblestone

Southern edge, or the modern Zeleni Venac area, was previously part of the trench which surrounded the Belgrade Fortress in the 18th century. When the trench was covered, a pond was formed. As Belgrade grew around it, the pond became a popular hunting attraction for the inhabitants of Belgrade. The pond was filled from the streams flowing down from Terazije from the springs below modern Hotel Moskva via a modern Prizrenska Street and from Varoš Kapija, future Kosančićev Venac via Gospodska, modern Brankova Street. A canal was dug in the 1830s which drained the pond in the direction of Bara Venecija. Only then the area began to properly urbanize. Apart from hunting, the area became one of the favorite excursion sites of the Belgraders, including the royals, like Princess Ljubica Obrenović. There were meyhanes on the shores so ferrymen could transport excursionists.

Kosančićev Venac is the oldest section of Belgrade outside the walls of the Kalemegdan fortress, "the oldest neighborhood in Belgrade". From this point the new Serbian town, as opposed to the old Turkish one in the fortress, began expanding from 1830 along the right bank of the Sava into Savamala. Residence of Princess Ljubica was built in 1831, Cathedral of Saint Archangel Michael in 1840, Hotel "Staro zdanje", kafana ?, Hotel "Kragujevac" and Metropolitan seat. The greatest effect on the economic prosperity and architectural shaping of Kosančićev venac was the vicinity of the Sava port which was the major hub of the international trade in Serbia at the time. Đumrukana, the custom house in Savamala, was built in 1835 and the surrounding neighborhood was built as a wide plateau with open storage facilities. Hotels, inns, stores and craft shops were soon built in Đumrukana's direction.

At modern 8 Kralja Petra Street, the first post office in Serbia was open on 7 June [O.S. 26 May] 1840. Called Praviteljstvena Menzulana, it dispatched mail on Wednesdays, Saturdays and twice on Sundays. The Cathedral of Saint Archangel Michael donated the lot on which its auxiliary objects were built and its classrooms to the city, so in 1844 the old building of the Elementary School King Petar I was built.

In 1867 Emilijan Josimović devised the regulation plan for Belgrade which also covered this area. Kosančićev Venac was projected as the beginning and one of three sections of the urban settlement which would connect Terazije and Kalemegdan. All three sections are called venac (in this case: round, cyclic street, literally it is Serbian for wreath) and in 1872 were named after three knights and heroes of the Battle of Kosovo: Kosančićev Venac, after Ivan Kosančić, Toplički Venac, after Milan Toplica and Obilićev Venac, after Miloš Obilić. The plan included covering the street with rough cobblestone (kaldrma).

Industrialist Milan Vapa founded the first paper mill in Belgrade in 1905 at the corner of Vuka Karadžića Street and Topličin Venac. In 1907 he relocated it to Kalenića Guvno. The first children's theatre in Belgrade was established in Kosančićev Venac. Founded by Branislav Nušić and Mihailo Sretenović, it was named Little Theatre in Belgrade, and was located in the hall of the Old Seminary which was adjacent to the Cathedral Church, below modern French embassy. The first performance was held on 6 September 1905 and the performers were children from the junior high school. In the winter of 1906, it was relocated to other venue outside of the neighborhood before being closed in 1907. At the beginning of the 20th century, new Palace of the Patriarchate was constructed on the location of the old Metropolitan seat as the representative building of the French embassy. King Petar I Elementary School was built in 1907. City lights were introduced in that period and the tram grid expanded. Kaldrma was partially replaced with granite cobblestone and later, in some parts of the neighborhood, with asphalt concrete. In 1925, the National Library of Serbia relocated to Kosančićev Venac.

During World War II, Kosančičev Venac was heavily damaged, mostly by the German bombing of Belgrade on 6 April 1941. Destroyed buildings include the National Library, Đumrukana, Hotel "Kragujevac" and the newly built construction of the King Alexander Bridge.

Since the late 2010s, several new buildings in modernist style, completely deviating from the rest of the surrounding buildings both in height and style, have been built.

At the corner of Čubrina and Topličin Venac streets, a monument dedicated to architect Aleksandar Deroko was unveiled on 9 March 2022. Deroko, who lived nearby, is presented as holding a sketchbook. The two meters tall bronze figure is placed on the sidewalk level, and was sculptured by Zoran Kuzmanović.

== Features ==
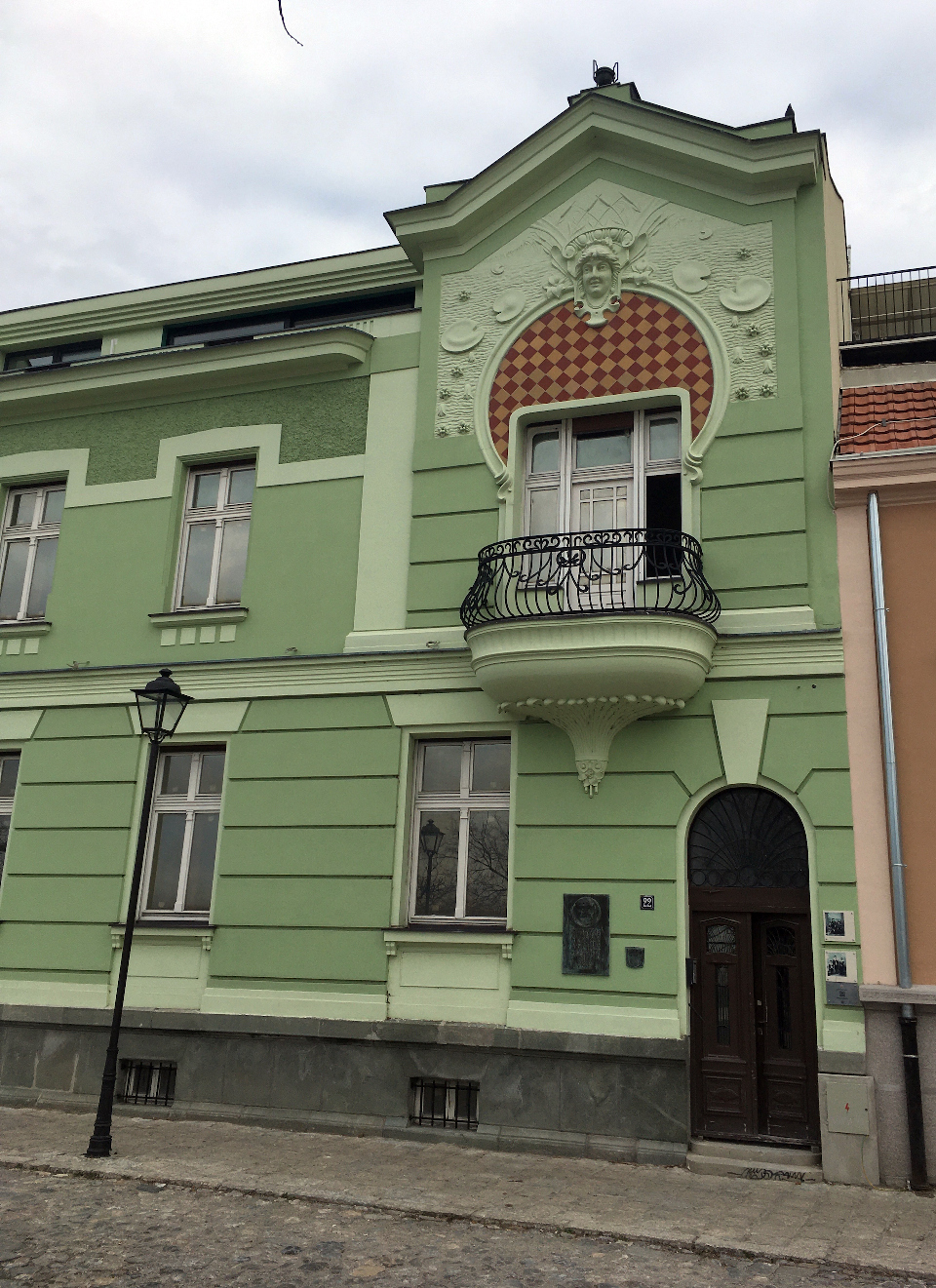
Mika Alas's House

The most recognizable characteristic of the neighborhood is the cobblestone, which still covers several streets in the area, though it has been badly damaged due to the frequent communal and infrastructural repairs. Because of the cobblestone and vintage appearance, Kosančićev Venac is nicknamed the jewel, or pearl, of Belgrade.

Several important early official buildings of Belgrade are located in the neighborhood:

- Residence of Princess Ljubica (built 1829-1831; officially a museum, section of the Museum of Belgrade)
- Cathedral of Saint Archangel Michael (built 1837-1840)
- Elementary School King Petar I (built 1905-1907)
- Palace of the Patriarchate (built 1932-1935)
- Mika Alas's House (built 1910; house of Mihailo Petrović, popularly nicknamed Mika Alas, Serbian mathematician and inventor, who was born and died in the house)

Between Mika Alas's House and the Little Staircase begins a park area which spreads along the street to the south. Sometimes called Mika Alas's Park, it covers 0.37 hectares (0.91 acres).

Other landmarks of the neighborhood include the buildings nicknamed Home with the Pedigree and Trajković House with the bust of Ivan Kosančić, sculptured by Petar Ubavkić in 1895. Important edifices are House of Dimitrije Krsmanović and House of Branislav Kojić.

The building with the painters' ateliers and the gallery of the Salon of the Museum of Contemporary Art, located at 14 Pariska Street, was built in 1960. It was designed by Miroslav Jovanović and intended to have both apartments for the painters and their studios, as well as an exhibition space and art gallery. Exhibited works were relocated to the Museum of the Contemporary Arts when it was opened in 1961. In January 2019, the building was declared a cultural monument. A bust of king Peter I was placed in 2011 on the small square, at the main entrance in the Elementary School King Petar I. The stone plinth was carved by Branimir Radisavljević, while the bust was sculptured by Dušan Jovanović Đukin. The original plinth was considered to be too low, so during the complete renovation in 2020, the plinth was elevated.

=== Staro Zdanje ===
In 1843 in Dubrovačka Street (today Kralja Petra), reigning prince Mihajlo Obrenović built a large edifice, which became the first hotel in Belgrade, called Kod jelena ("Deer's"). Many criticized the move at the time, primarily due to the cost and the size of the building, but it soon became the gathering point of the wealthiest citizens. They included Anastas Jovanović (first Serbian photographer), politician Ilija Garašanin, writer Ljubomir Nenadović, etc. Painter Stevan Todorović also stayed often, so the prince gave him a room so that he could open the first artistic school and fencing school in Serbia. The hotel had the first ballroom in Belgrade.

It was built from 1841 to 1843 on the location of the former khan, "Cincar-han." The hotel, later renamed to "Grand Hotel," had around one hundred rooms. Clientele included military officers, diplomats, and state and foreign dignitaries. The hotel had the first dance school in Serbia, which employed "Austrian tanc-majstor", and the first proper tailor salon in the city, where clothing of the "latest Parisienne fashion" was tailored.

Princess consort of Serbia Persida Karađorđević donated money in 1848 for one of the halls in the edifice to be adapted into the permanent theatre hall. This was the second permanent theatre in Belgrade, after the first at Đumrukana, which was closed in 1842. The theatre was named "Theatre at Deer's". The theatre was operational from May 1848 to March 1849.

Colloquially, because of its size comparing to the other buildings at the time, the building was also referred to as Staro zdanje, or the "Old Mansion". It was damaged in a fire in 1849 but later restored. Queen Natalie, as the sole heir of the dethroned Obrenović dynasty, sold the building to the state railroads company in 1903. The hotel operated in the building until that same year, when the Railroad Directory moved in. They moved out in 1938 when the building was demolished. In the 19th century, close to the hotel at the modern 8 Kralja Petra Street, the first pharmacy in Belgrade was opened.

As an affluent, developing neighborhood and with the proximity of the port, soon other hotels were built in the area. Best known included Nacional and Grand. Hotel Nacional was built across the southernmost extension of Kalemegdan at the lowest section of the Pariska Street where it meets the Great Staircase, which connects it to Savamala and the river bank. The Grand Hotel was built close to the cathedral church, but was later relocated to the Čika Ljubina Street, near the modern Faculty of Philosophy Plateau, across the Instituto Cervantes building.

=== Lifting crane ===
There are still remnants of the big crane which was used to lift goods directly from the pier below to the elevated Kosančićev Venac. Below the ridge on which Kosančićev Venac is located, there are numerous lagums, underground corridors, which were used as wine cellars and storages. They are located along the Karađorđeva Street, being dug into the hill so that goods could be stored directly after being loaded off the boats in the port. Entrances into the lagums are today buried and the corridors are largely forgotten.

=== National Library ===
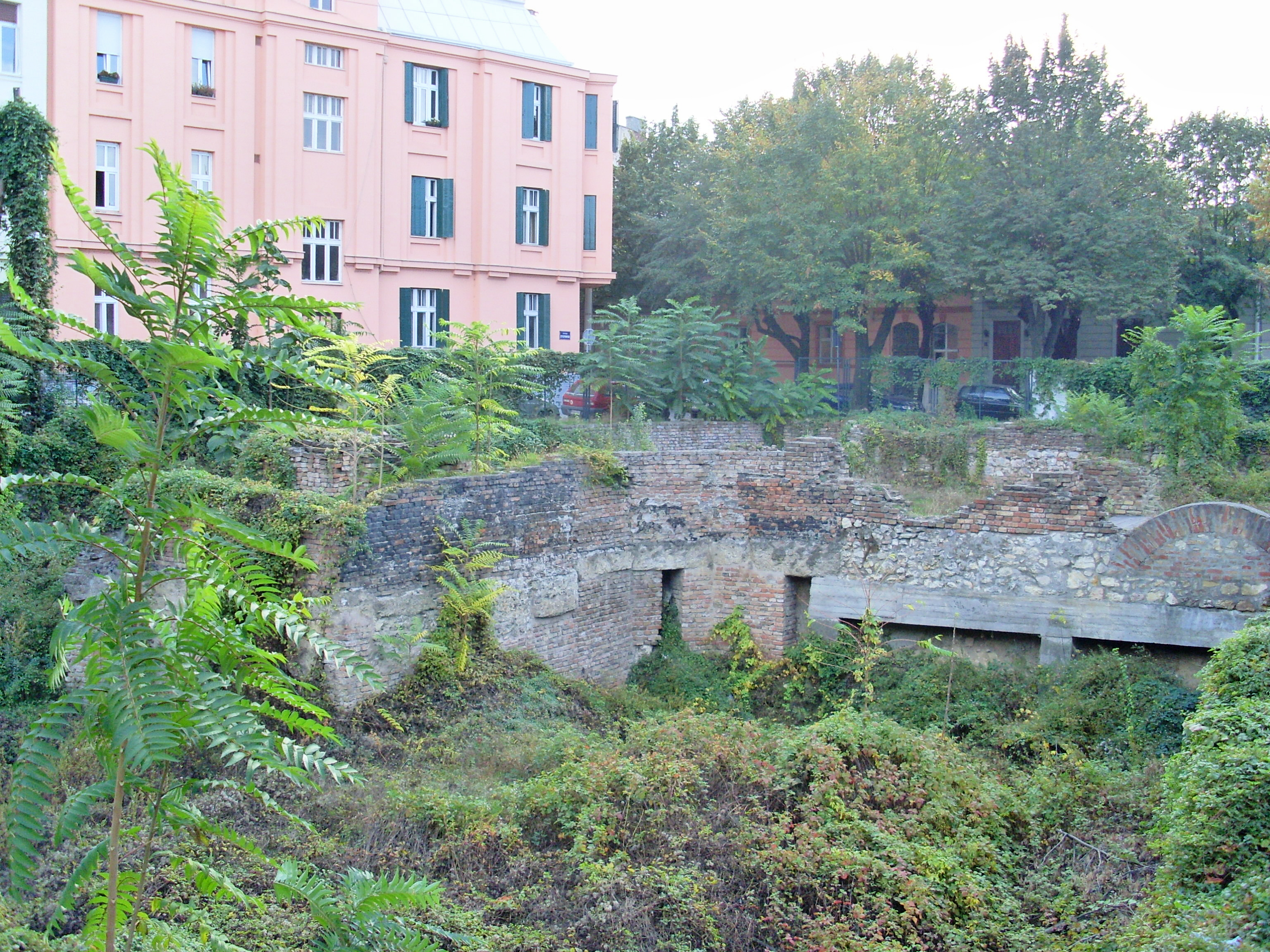
Destroyed in April 1941 by the German aerial bombardment of Belgrade during the invasion of Yugoslavia, the National Library remains are shown here in 2008

National Library of Serbia was located in the neighborhood from 1925. Building was constructed in the second half of the 19th century, it was owned by Milija Marković Raspop and artist Stevan Todorović, who held singing and painting classes in the house. Czech painter and émigré Kiril Kutlik opened the Serbian drawing and painting school in the house in 1895. Industrialist Milan Vapa bought the house in 1910 and opened a paper mill. In 1921, Vapa sold the house to the Ministry of Education specifically for the National Library. The project of the building's adaptation was conducted by Branko Tanazević and the new library was officially opened in 1925. During the German bombing of Belgrade on 6 April 1941, it was heavily bombed and then burned to the ground by the ensuing fire. The library burned for 4 days and remains the only national library in Europe destroyed in a planned attack and one of the largest book bonfires in European history.

Some 500,000 books perished, including 1,500 Medieval Cyrillic manuscripts, charters and incunables dating from 12th to 17th century, 1,500 maps, 4,000 magazines, 1,800 newspapers, vast Turkish sources on Serbia during Ottoman rule, and personal correspondence of some of the most important people in cultural history of Serbia, like Vuk Karadžić, Đura Daničić, Pavel Šafarik and Lukijan Mušicki. The site of the library was left in ruins with a commemorative plaque. In the 1970s, archaeological digging was conducted on the library's location. Tens of thousands of charred books were dug up and handed over to the National Library. Since 2012, regular literary evenings are being held in the open, within the remnants of the building.

The commander of the attack was the Generaloberst Alexander Löhr. When he was captured and trialed after the war, he said that Hitler personally ordered for the National Library to be destroyed first: "In the first wave we were supposed to destroy the National Library, and only then to bomb what was of military importance to us." Asked why the library, he replied: "Because in that institution was kept what made cultural identity of these people for so long." Löhr, who committed numerous war crimes not only in Yugoslavia, kept the attitude during the trial, asking for the public to be removed from the courtroom, disliking the way they looked at him, "like I am some kind of a criminal." He was sentenced to death and on 26 February 1947 executed by the firing squad in Belgrade, the city which he tried to destroy. The intentional bombing of the library has been described as one of the "greatest tragedies of Serbian culture" and "greatest culturcides in World War II".

Within the scopes of the planned reconstruction of Kosančićev Venac and Savamala in June 2017, the building of a memorial park at the location of the ruined National library was announced. It was supposed to have two levels which would comprise a small amphitheater, black concrete monoliths which represent scattered books ("knowledge graveyard"), a flower garden, ramps and stairways, an elevated small square ("piazzetta"), a small fountain, benches, and info tables with photos. The remaining foundations were to be preserved and embedded into the new project which would be encircled with the wall of the béton brut with horizontal openings in it, to allow the spectators from the outside to see inside. In April 2020, city announced that the construction of the memorial would start in 2021. The architect Boris Podrecca was awarded the job, despite his design being criticized. "Few stones" which mark the traces of the demolished library, with some designed greenery, was described as the solution in the l'art pour l'art vein, which speaks about nothing. There was no expert or public debate whether the object should be rebuilt and how to establish the correlation with other parts of Kosančićev Venac. Lack of interest by the city and the state to do the reconstruction properly, including experiences of other European cities, was described as a cultural and ethical abyss of Serbia. In March 2021 it was announced that the start of the project was moved to 2022.

During her visit to Serbia in September 2021, German chancellor Angela Merkel said that Germany would help the "reconstruction of Serbia" with €500,000. It was understood at the time as a donation for the reconstruction of the pre-war library, which in time became a more and more popular idea. However, in February 2022, the city moved the project to 2023, confirming Podrecca's design. However, in April 2022, the director of the National Library of Serbia Vladimir Pištalo announced that the government allocated funds for the international architectural design competition for the full reconstruction of the demolished building. Pištalo added that the exterior of the building would be completely replicated, while the interior would host a memorial center with a wall of remembrance. As the building was constructed on top of the villa from the Roman period, a glass floor which would allow observance of the remains was also mentioned. In front of the building, an eternal flame is planned.

=== Hôtel Palace ===
Hotel Palace is located in Topličin Venac, an eastern extension of the neighborhood next to the Park Proleće. Construction began in 1921. The six-floor building was open on 12 May 1923 and at the time it was "the most beautiful and most modern hotel in the entire kingdom (Yugoslavia), and by the experts' judgment, it had no match in the entire Balkans". Architect and owner Leon Talvi said that, even though he was projecting a business object, he was guided by aesthetic reasons. On the fifth floor, there was an artistic gallery which consisted of five salons and an expensive collection made from the works of Italian, French, Russian and Yugoslav painters. The hotel had luxurious apartments, a theatre (variety show) and cinema hall, dancing hall, three elevators, central heating, hot water, icehouse, garage, bus parking lot, etc. The pre-war hotel is described today as "Europe before the European Union".

After it was finished, it was the tallest building in Belgrade. Talvi designed it in the eclectic style, with the elements of Neo Baroque. The façade is known for its small balconies with the wrought iron railings and the Mansard roof. On the Maršala Birjuzova Street side, the façade is ornamented with various coats of arms. The first ever recorded jazz performance in Belgrade was held in the hotel's bar. The palace had its own carriage service, American Bar for reading, smoking, and hosted regular concerts at 17:00. Belgrade was a city with only petty crimes until after World War I. A murder in the hotel in 1923, dubbed "Mystery of the murder in room 48", was the "first major, international city murder" in Belgrade. Hotel Palace achieved further notoriety in 1929 when it became known as the gathering place of spies. On 15 October 1929, a shootout between foreign agents occurred in the hotel while the hotel manager fled abroad. That same year, a central dome was damaged in the fire.

After a financial collapse in the 1930s, Talvi sold the hotel to Đura Bogdanović, and eventually emigrated to Israel. After World War II began in 1939 but before it spread to Yugoslavia in 1941, Hotel Palace was sold in 1940 to the Government of France. They adapted it into the French Cultural Center, which was to boost the cultural, scientific, and technical cooperation between the two countries. The center was reopened by French author Georges Duhamel. Right after the occupation in April 1941, German Wehrmacht command moved in and all of the highest officers lived in the apartments. Germans looted all the works of art from the hotel. From 1945 Hotel Palace was again a French Cultural Center, until 1948 when Yugoslav government traded the Union Palace building in Knez Mihailova Street, where the French Cultural Center is still located today, for Hotel Palace.

Hotel Palace was first ceded to the Finance ministry which used it to accommodate their clerks. Foreign ministry then took it over for foreign guests, diplomats, and visitors. Still, the hotel was on the verge of bankruptcy by 1957 when it became part of the Belgrade's School for Tourism and Hospitality, founded in 1938 and the largest one in Serbia. Hotel Palace was revitalized and became especially popular among the athletes and served as sports' quarantine. The marble ground floor was eventually reconstructed to resemble the pre-war appearance, with the stone fountain with the paintings by Kosta Bradić (1927-2014), as the original paintings disappeared long time ago.

Well-known historical figures which stayed in the hotel include Rabindranat Tagore, Mikhail Gorbachev and Geraldine Chaplin. Today, Hotel Palace is a 4-star hotel with 86 units in total (33 one-bed rooms, 38 two-bed rooms, and 15 apartments).

=== Park of the Non-Aligned Countries ===
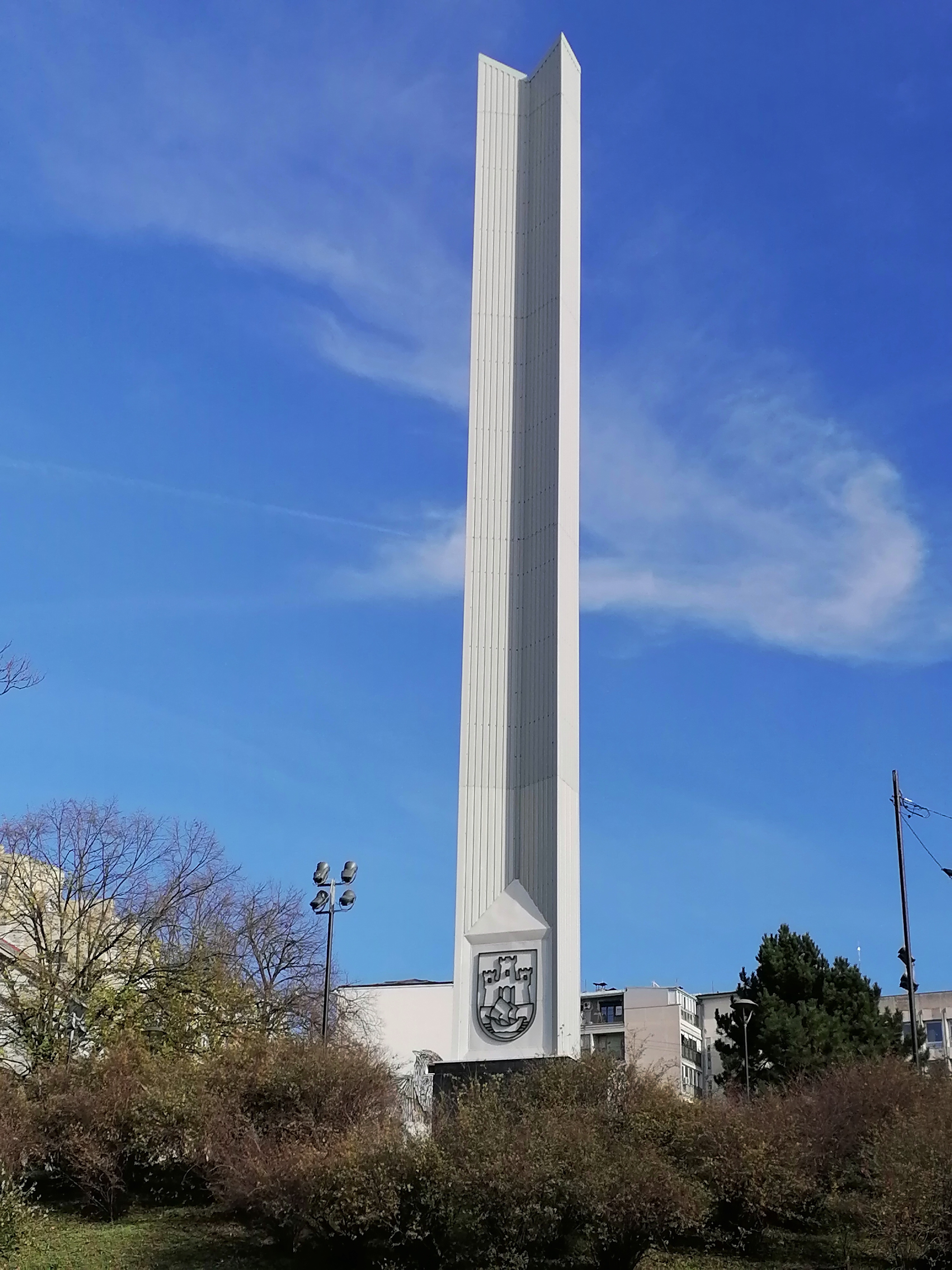
Obelisk in the park dedicated to the Non-Aligned Movement

The southernmost section of the neighborhood is occupied by the Park of the Non-Aligned Countries. It is located on the plateau above the beginning section of the Branko's bridge. A main feature in the park is the 27-meters high white obelisk. It was part of the project which included four temporary installations to mark the First Summit of the Non-Aligned Movement, held in Belgrade in September 1961. The obelisk was part of the project which included four temporary installations which were built for the event, the other three being another obelisk at the Square of Marx and Engels, the triumphal arch in Mostar and the triangle "peace-independence-equality" at Topčiderska Zvezda.

Unlike the other three installations, which were made of steel tubes, a different technique was used for the obelisk. Projected by Dušan Milenković, it consists of two triangular power line columns welded together, and was placed as a temporary solution which was supposed to be replaced by the real monument. Architect Svetislav Ličina proposed its location. However, it was never replaced nor dismantled, while the other three installations were taken apart after the conference.

The obelisk was officially unveiled on 1 September 1961. For the Ninth Summit of the Non-Aligned Movement which was again held in Belgrade, the obelisk was renovated in 1989 and was given its present appearance, which includes the City of Belgrade's coat of arms embellishment. Being white, there is a constant battle between the city's communal services who clean it and people who vandalize it with graffiti. In 2005, the obelisk was covered with a gigantic condom replica as part of the anti-HIV monthly campaign. As a permit wasn't obtained by the authorities, it was quickly removed.

In February 2021, it was announced that the five-story (ten semi-levels) underground garage would be built below the park, a new cultural venue would be built in the park, while the remaining part of the park would be regreened. The garage would have 384 lots and the obelisk would be on top of it. Small square and plateau are also planned in the park. In July 2020, it was announced that the obelisk would be renovated before its 60th anniversary on 1 September 2021 (finished by 6 October), though the planned works on other parts of the park may not start before 2022.

== Population ==
The local community Varoš Kapija, comprising partially the area of Kosančićev Venac had a population of 2,555 in 1981, 2,274 in 1991 and 1,988 in 2002. The municipality of Stari Grad later abolished the local communities.

== Protection ==
The neighborhood was declared an archaeological site in 1964, being located within the boundaries of the ancient Singidunum. In 1971, Kosančićev Venac was officially added to the Spatial Cultural-Historical Units of Great Importance list, and in 1979 was named a Monument of Culture, as "it is the area of the oldest Serbian settlement and the first developed administrative, cultural, spiritual and economic center of the city with specific ambient qualities". Apart from the central Kosančićev Venac street, the protected area encompasses the streets of Srebrnička, Fruškogorska, Zadarska, Kralja Petra (lower section), Pop-Lukina and Kneza Sime Markovića, and includes Cathedral Church, Princess Ljubica's Residence, Patriarchal See, Elementary School King Petar I and the Kafana "?".

== In popular culture ==
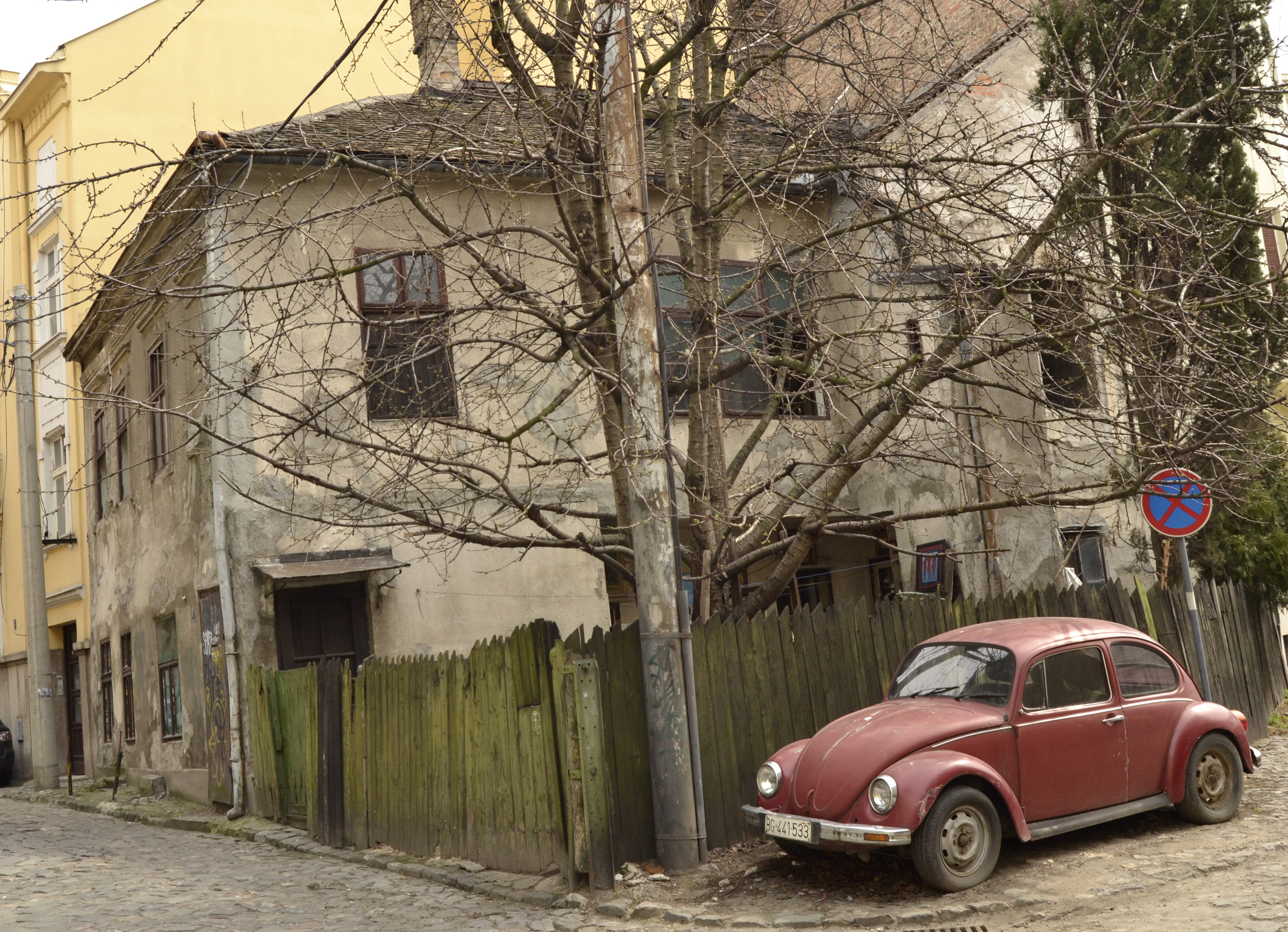
The house used as a filming location for the classic 1982 Yugoslav film The Marathon Family

Due to its archaic look, Kosančićev Venac, was a location where several movies and TV series were filmed: Otpisani (1974–76), The Marathon Family (1982), and Underground (1995).

Standing in for the house and the burial home of the Topalović family in the cult movie The Marathon Family, the house, located at 5 Zadarska (today Dobrice Ćosića) Street, became an attraction. The original house was built in the first half of the 19th century, while the upper floor was added in 1905. Even then, it stood out as the humbler object compared to the rest of the buildings in the neighborhood. By 2019 it deteriorated a great deal. It remained one of the few buildings in the neighborhood which were not renovated, due to property ownership issues.

== Reconstruction ==
In 2007, the city government announced ambitious plans for the revitalization of Kosančićev Venac and the neighboring riverside section of Savamala. The first concern was the stabilization of the ground as the entire western slope of the ridge descending to the Sava is a mass wasting area (the leaning of the Cathedral Church is already visible from a distance). Kosančićev Venac is projected as the future cultural center of Belgrade. As it is not allowed to change the general shape of the neighborhood, Kosančićev Venac is declared a "zone of minor interventions" with several specific points of reconstruction. However, nothing has been done until 2016 when the new, revised plan of reconstruction and protection was adopted. The project covers 20 ha (49 acres) and mostly rehashes the former ideas:

- Memorial center of the National Library of Serbia; a memorial center to commemorate the old location was to be built not as a monument, but as a "vigorous and modern cultural institution"; new plan gave a carte blanche to the architect Boris Podrecca.
- Đumrukana; an old custom house (Turkish: gümrük), as the very first administrative building built in the newly autonomous Serbia from the Turks, it was a symbol of the liberated country and also the location where the first theatre shows were organized in Belgrade in 1841-1842; only the foundations survive today, so the building will be reconstructed from scratch; it is also projected that Đumrukana will be an object of culture.
- A lookout point and a pedestrian pathway from downtown to the Sava bank, as today Kosančićev Venac has no direct approach to the river even though it is right above it. The only existing connections are two step-streets (Velike Stepenice and Male Stepenice, "Big steps" and "Small steps", respectively); the natural lookout at the connection of the Kosančićev venac and Kralja Petra streets is considered one of the most beautiful in Belgrade.
- New representative cultural institution; will be built between the streets of Kosančićev venac and Karađorđeva; the 2016 project specified it to be the City Gallery, dug into the ridge in the cascade construction.
- Existing Beton-Hala ("Concrete-Hall") in the port will be turned into a cultural and commercial center and a new green parking for tourist buses will be built too. It was later announced that works on Beton-Hala will begin in the autumn of 2007 and by spring 2008 it should be turned into the Museum of sports.
- 2016 project added reconstruction of the façades, streets and the Patriarchal See and the turning of the entire Kosančićev Venac area into the pedestrian zone with lots of trees.

The first phase, which included streets and façades, began on 7 September 2016. The projects were styled historically by city authorities, though they were overdue. The phase was to be finished in February 2017, but as of May work was not even close to ending, with the streets being dug out, the buildings being covered in nylons and scaffolds, and the entire neighborhood being noisy and covered in dust for months. Newspapers described Kosančićev Venac as "horror movie scenery", "ghostly" or looking like "World War II". In June 2017, city urbanist Milutin Folić, announced that the façades would be finished in July, kaldrma only by the end of the year, the library would be revitalized in 2018 and when that was finished, the gallery would be built. In August 2017, the deadline for façades was moved to November, to be finished concurrently with kaldrma, which was being arranged according to the plans from 1903. However, as of February 2018, the troubled project was not yet finished, while architects denounced the quality of the works. The criticisms included: frequent pauses and overall length of the works, disappearance of the original kaldrma from some parts of the street, general sloppiness and bad quality, bad leveling and height of the drains which caused formation of ponds during the rain, several digging-ups of the same sections, hodgepodge of the materials used, removal of some trees but not planting any new ones, low quality of the façades which were already cracking, etc. The reconstruction was officially declared finished on 25 February 2018. Architect and resident of Kosančićev Venac, Cecilija Bartok, criticized every aspect of the reconstruction (narrowing of the street, change of the materials, displacement of the sewage, incompetence of the workers) stating that the only work that really had to be done was reconstruction of the façades. She asserted that the entire neighborhood lost its authenticity and that it was devoid of its charm.

In July 2017 Folić announced the reconstruction of the Karađorđeva street from the Beton-Hala to the Branko's Bridge, along the southern border of Kosančićev Venac. The works, projected by Podrecca, would start at the end of 2017 and would include: widening of the sidewalks, planting of the avenue, further reconstruction of the façades, relocation of the tramway closer to the river onto the cobblestones, and construction of parking for the buses which picked up the tourists from the port. This design was also criticized by architects for lacking any culturological idea of connecting major historical and cultural objects and existing functional units.

As the city wasn't able to push the city gallery project due to problems with private ownership rights on the land, in October 2018 state government officials declared the construction of the gallery a "public interest", which allowed the expropriation of the parcels. The aboveground section of the gallery would be 8 m (26 ft) tall and cover 140 m^{2} (1,500 sq ft). It would be located on the future small square, 60 to 24 m (197 to 79 ft), one-third of which would be covered by trees. The square would also be arranged as the scenic viewpoint. The gallery would have three levels below the square, two of which would be dug into the hill as it descends down to Savamala and the river. Vertical transportation would be possible via stairs, elevators, and ridable miniature railway. In July 2020 it was announced that the construction would start by the end of 2021. As legal problems continued, in September 2021 it was announced that, at best, the construction would start in 2023.

=== Tunnel ===
For decades, a 200 m (660 ft) long tunnel have been proposed in the western section of the neighborhood. It would follow the route of the Pariska Street, between the streets of Gračanička and Uzun Mirkova. This would allow for the ground level to be transformed into the plateau with a fountain, which would make an extension of the pedestrian zone of Knez Mihailova Street and create a continuous pedestrian zone from the Republic Square and Palace Albania to the Kalemegdan Park, the Belgrade Fortress and the rivers. It was envisioned by the first phase of the planned Belgrade Metro, 1973-1982.

A longer version from the Gračanička Street to monument of Rigas Feraios in the Tadeuša Košćuškog Street resurfaced in 2012, in conjunction with the project of connecting the Savamala port and the fortress. In March 2012 it was announced that the construction would start by the end of the year. However, the planners from the 1970s version were against the execution because they believed that the entire complex could exist only if there are already functioning subway lines, which as of 2018, were still not built. This way, the traffic problems would not be solved. Due to the price, a general halt of the subway construction, and constant changes in its routes, the project hasn't materialized yet.

== See also ==
- Belgrade
- Spatial Cultural-Historical Units of Great Importance
- Tourism in Serbia
