= Monument to Vojvoda Vuk =

1922 statue by Đorđe Jovanović

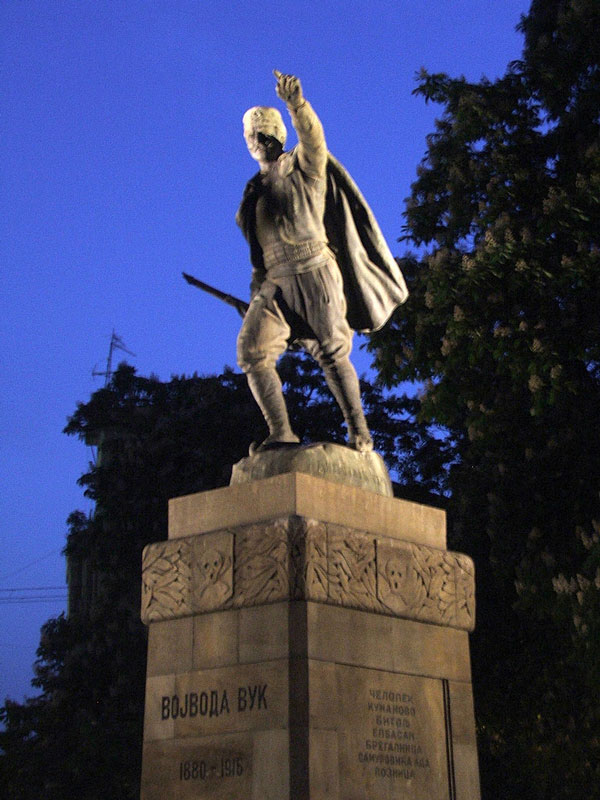
- Interactive map of Monument to Vojvoda Vuk
- Location: Belgrade, Serbia
- Coordinates: 44°49′00″N 20°27′18″E
- Designer: Đorđe Jovanović
- Material: Bronze, sandstone
- Height: 6 metres (20 ft)
- Opening date: 23 October 1936
- Dedicated to: Vojin Popović

Monument to Vojvoda Vuk is a sculpture in the Park Proleće in Belgrade, Serbia. The sculpture was created by Đorđe Jovanović in 1922 and the monument was erected in 1936. It is dedicated to the most respected figure of the Chetnik movement.

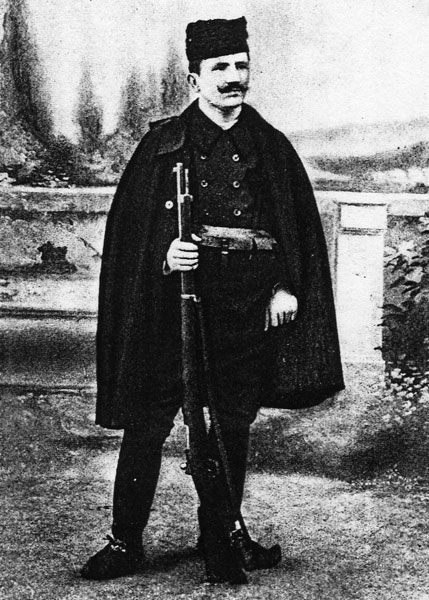
Vojvoda Vuk – Vojin Popović

The mortal remains of Vojin Popović, known Vojvoda Vuk (Duke Vuk), were transferred to Belgrade from Serbian Military Cemetery Zeitenlik near Thessaloniki, on 30 September 1923. After a memorial service held in the Orthodox Cathedral and a farewell speech delivered from the balcony of the National Theatre, the funeral procession attended the coffin through central streets of Belgrade to the Vojvoda's final resting place in Belgrade New Cemetery (Novo groblje).

== Biography of Vojin Popović ==
Popović was born in 1881 in Sjenica, Kosovo Vilayet, Ottoman Empire (present-day southwestern Serbia). His family fled from Ottoman rule and settled in Kragujevac, where he attended school. After graduating from the Military Academy in Belgrade in 1903 with the rank of infantry second lieutenant, Vojin Popović chose to join the Chetnik organisation in 1905, and in 1911 joined the secret organization "Unification or Death" (Black Hand). He fought against the Ottomans in Macedonia and Old Serbia between 1905 and 1912 (battles at Čelopek, Кumanovo, Prilep, Bitola, and the bank of the Vardar) and against the Bulgarians on the river Bregalnica in 1913. He won military renown in the First World War battles of the Drina, the Коlubara and particularly for Cer, and was decorated with the Order of the Кarađorđe Star, 4th and 3rd class (officer and commander). He was promoted to the rank of infantry lieutenant colonel of the Serbian Army, and despite his reputation of being a strict and unbendable officer, he was favoured with complete trust. He was remembered above all as the most exemplary Chetnik leader (vojvoda) because of his exceptionally courageous and inspirational military leadership. His units provided security for Crown Prince Aleksandar Karađorđević during the withdrawal across Аlbania which ensued after the heavy losses Serbia suffered in 1915. In the winter of 1916 he commanded the volunteer detachment engaged in battle with Bulgarians over the strategic peak of Mt Nidža, Kajmakčalan, on the Salonika front. He was wounded at Grunište vis in the River Crna area, but continued to pursue the enemy. On 29 November 1916, at the final stage of the battle, he died of a bullet to the heart.

== Proposition and erection ==
Following Popović's funeral in Belgrade, the idea of erecting a monument to the Vojvoda Vuk began to take shape. The city council allotted the location in a small park in Topličin Venac. The necessary funds were provided by numerous supporters. Sculptor Đorđe Jovanović, trained in Vienna, Мunich and Paris, was hired to work on the sculpture for the monument, and a bronze cast was completed in Prague in 1922. The erection of the memorial was postponed due to shady political events involving members of the "Black Hand" and the disbandment of the chetnik units under pressure from European governments.

On Sunday 23 October 1936, commemorating the 20th anniversary of his death, the monument was unveiled and dedicated to Vojin Popović, Vojvoda Vuk. The monument was unveiled by lawyer Milan Aćimović, Popović's comrade in war, to the chetnik anthem and in the presence of several thousand people, dozens of high-ranking military and civil officials and the envoy of Peter II of Yugoslavia. The monument was placed in the park in Topličin Venac, in the centre of the capital of the Kingdom of Yugoslavia.

== Description ==
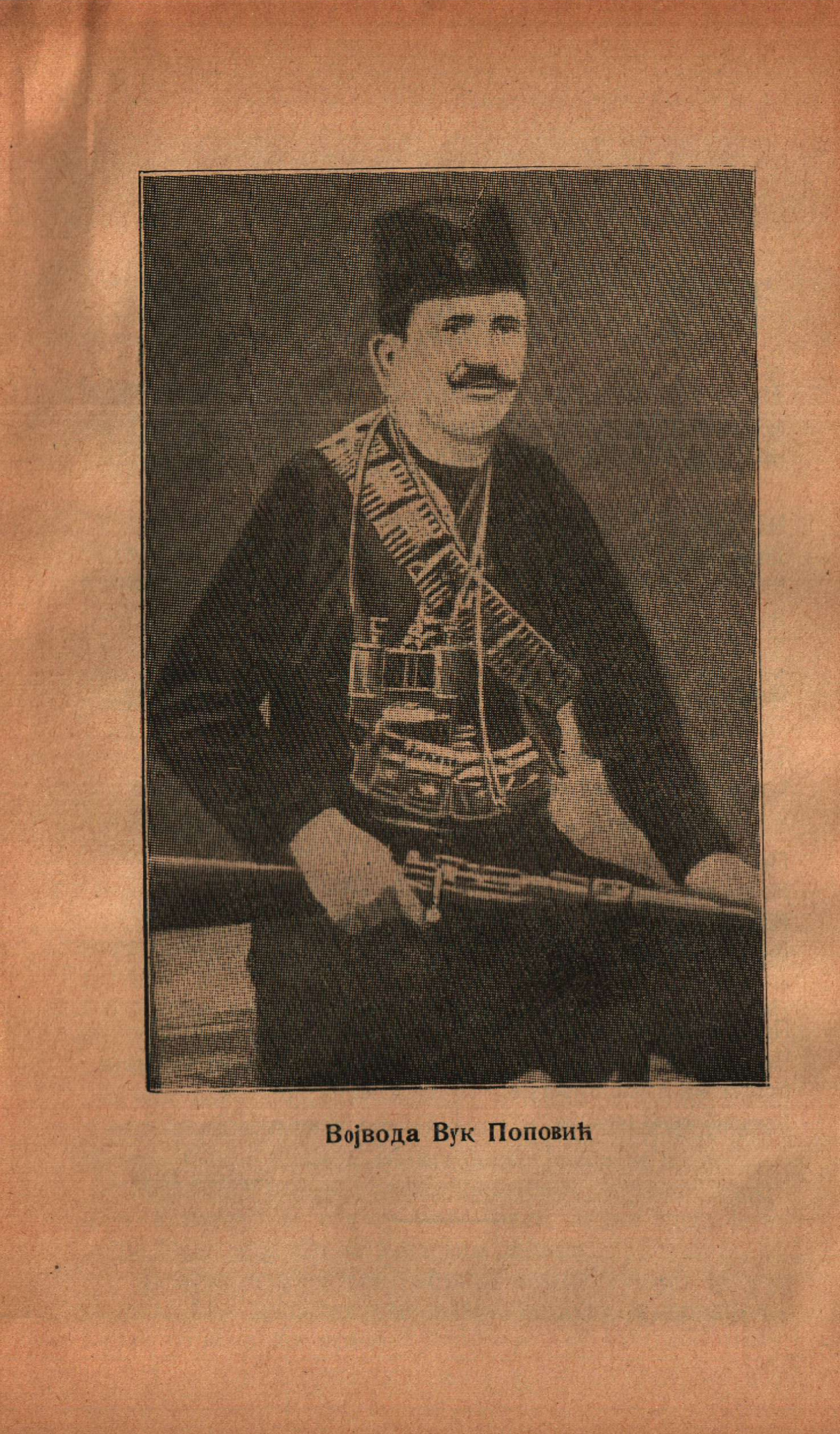
Vojin Popović

The 2-metre (6 ft 7 in) bronze statue stands atop of a 4-metre-tall (13 ft) cuboid pedestal of dressed sandstone blocks. It follows the design of European-inspired memorials erected across Serbia in honour of the soldiers fallen in the Balkan Wars and the First World War. Vojvoda is represented vigorously stepping forward on a symbolic elevation in a respite between battles: the weapon in his right hand is lowered while his left hand points to the towns in southern Serbia yet to be liberated. Vojvoda Vuk is portrayed realistically, in the expression of his face and in the traditional garment of a chetnik leader of the national army, which consists of some parts of the traditional costume with a cape, a cap with a chetnik badge (a skull with crossed rifles and a two-headed eagle), and an ammunition belt around the waist.

The sculptor's signature and date are inscribed at the bottom of the figure: Đ. Jovanović 1929. The inscription on the front of the pedestal reads: "Vojvoda Vuk 1880–1916", and affixed to its right and left sides are plaques engraved with the names of the sites where he took part in battles. On the right side: Čelopek, Кumanovo, Elbasan, Bregalnica, Samurovića Ada, Loznica. On the left side: Јadar, Konatica, Belgrade, Vlasina, Kajmakčalan, Siva Stena, Grunište. The pedestal is buttressed at four corners by low piers. Its upper edge is hemmed with a laurel wreath carved in low relief upon which, on each of the four sides, rests a skull and crossed bones. The Vojvoda stands on the triumphal laurel wreath, immortalized in glory, but with the emblem of membership of the popular volunteer army. The style of the relief on the pedestal reflects interwar artistic trends, being more modern and evoking art deco stylisation, whereas the statue, of an earlier date, shows energy in motion but no modernisation in expression. Type analogies are clear and so are the influences of French sculpture, notably of Auguste Rodin, and similarities can also be drawn to a few earlier sculptures of Đorđe Jovanović: Prince Miloš Obrenović, the monument in Požarevac (1897), A Montenegrin (1902), A Woman Scything (1915), and The Victor in Paraćin (1920).

== Importance ==
The statue of Vojvoda Vuk has special historical and artistic value as one of the memorials to the liberation wars of Serbia. It is a historical document on the Serbian national volunteer army and as a work of one of the most prominent Serbian sculptors. This is the only monument to a chetnik vojvoda in Belgrade, and in full-length figure. The other commanders served in the regular army and many are represented in the form of busts. The monument celebrated the idea of the liberator of Serbian lands, but also of the warrior as an ultimate role model. The statue does not depict an idealised image, but rather is an actual likeness; he is depicted as somewhat older man though he was thirty-six when he succumbed to his wounds. The Memorial to Vojvoda Vuk was designated a cultural heritage property in 2014.
