= King Petar I Elementary School =

Elementary school in Belgrade, Serbia

Coordinates: 44.8184°N 20.4529°E

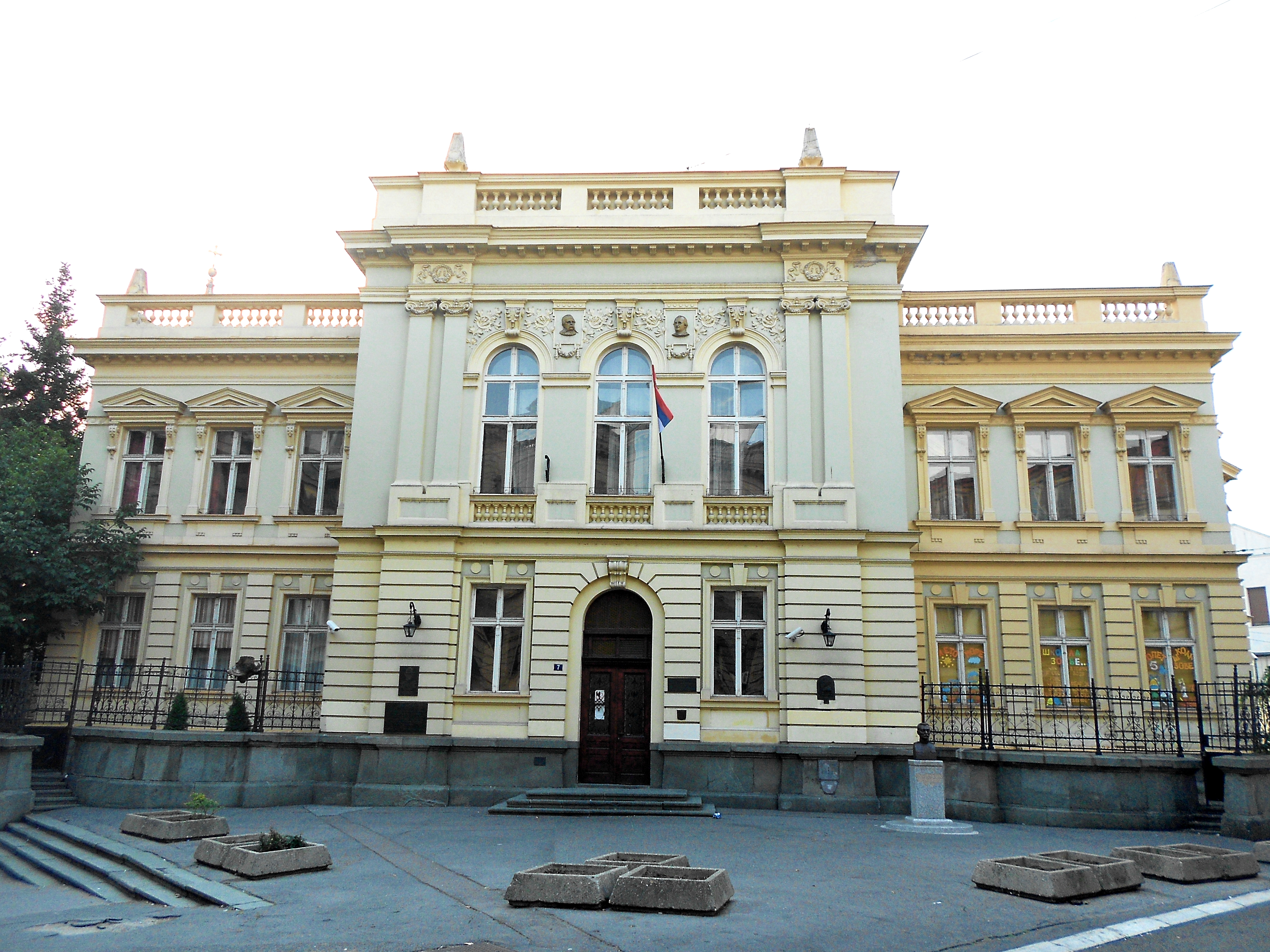
King Petar I Elementary School

King Petar I Elementary School (Serbian: Основна школа "Краљ Петар Први") is an elementary school in Belgrade, Serbia.

The original school was founded in 1718 and is the oldest surviving cultural and educational institution in Serbia, predating the foundations of the Gymnasium of Karlovci (1796), Great School (modern Belgrade University; 1808), Matica Srpska (1826) and Society of Serbian Scholarship (modern Serbian Academy of Sciences and Arts; 1841). It was the first school in Serbia which introduced the teacher notebooks and gym classes and is the location of the first basketball match played in Belgrade.

The present building was built in 1905–1907. It was designed by Jelisaveta Načić, the first Serbian female architect, when she was only 27 years old. It is located at 7 Kralja Petra Street in Belgrade. At the time of its construction, it was the most modern school building for elementary education not only in Belgrade, but in entire Serbia, and is named the "ornament of the school architecture". Exceptionally representative, which was conditioned by the position in such an important street and in the immediate vicinity of the Cathedral Church, Building of the Patriarchate and Princess Ljubica's Residence, the building is a true representative of the social and cultural situation in Serbia at the beginning of the 20th century.

== School ==
=== History and tradition ===
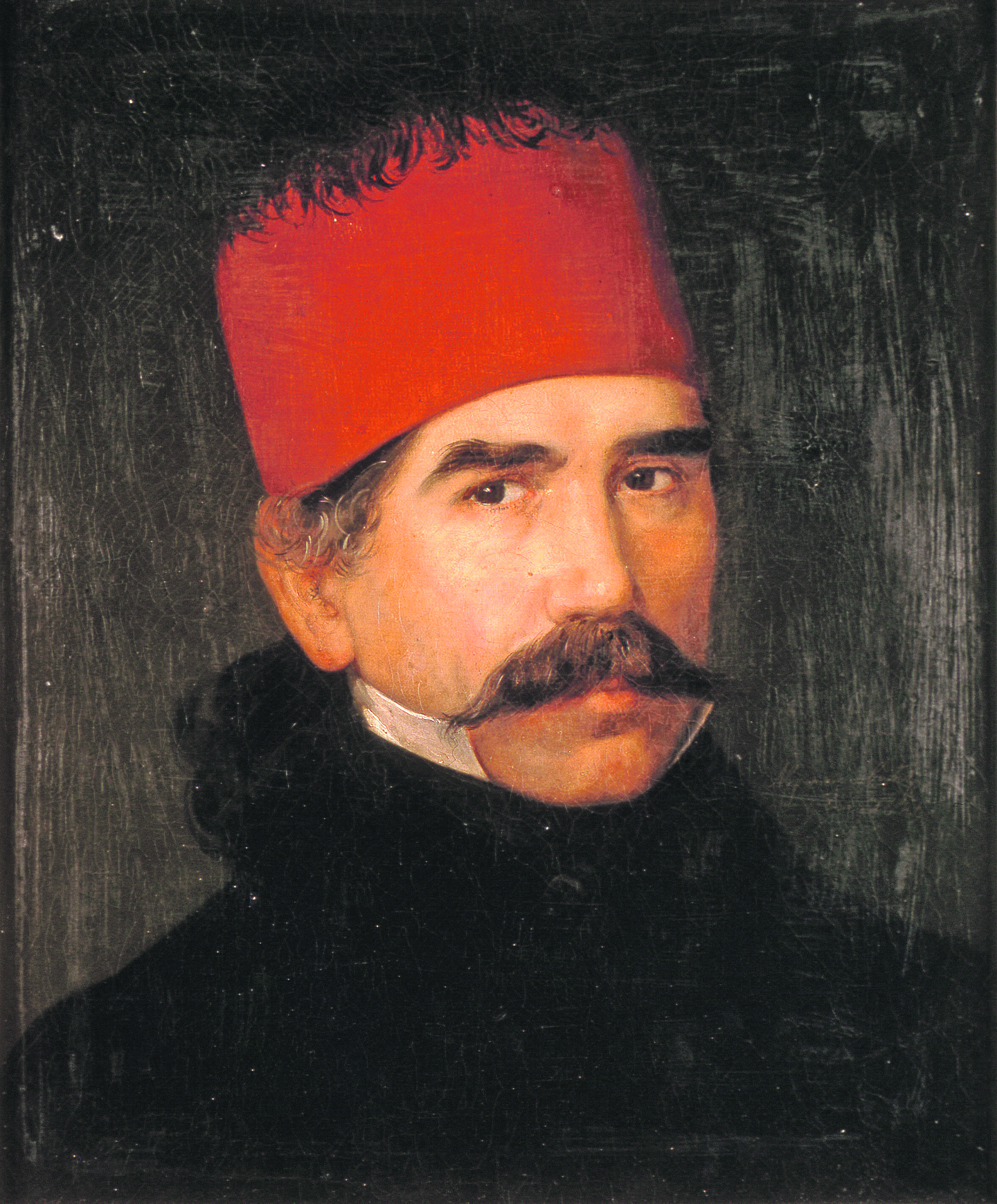
Linguist and folklorist Vuk Karadžić was one of the teachers

There is even an older predecessor of the school, called a Little Greek School. During the 1718-1739 Austrian occupation of northern Serbia it was to be closed by the Austrian authorities in 1718, but the Belgrade Metropolitan Mojsije Petrović took it over in order for the Serbian children to have a school. It was mentioned as the Little Serbo-Slavic School, with a teacher (daskal) Stevan, who held classes in the metropolitan's home. The school was funded by the Metropolitanate of Belgrade, city administration and pupil's parents. From 1809 the school was placed on the ground floor of the Great School (which by 1905 developed into the University of Belgrade) and became known as a Little School. The schools were located in the building of the modern Museum of Vuk and Dositej. Little School had only three classes. By 1815, the school was moved close to the Cathedral Church, with only one teacher. By 1819 it had two and in 1829 three teachers. Among the teachers were Vuk Karadžić, Dositej Obradović, Jovan Miodragović, Pavle Šafarik.

The area around the Cathedral Church in Belgrade is an almost unique area in Belgrade, since there are few places which were unchanged for more than two centuries. This was the venue of the Serbs gathered around the church, cultural and educational institutions, so in the 19th century the elementary school already existed at the place where in the period from 1905 to 1907 the elementary school "King Petar I" was built, designed by Jelisaveta Načić. It was the building with stores in the semi-basement and the school on the ground floor. The old building was located on the place of the south-west tract of the present school, with the access to the Kralja Petra Street occupying one half of the present roadway. When the regulation and the weight of the street was changed in the early 20th century, several lots were joined forming the proper-shaped lot which became the school property.

Part of this lot was donated by the nearby Cathedral Church. It was the parcel on which the auxiliary objects of the church yard were built, which were used as classrooms until the old school building was constructed in 1844. This property, assigned to the school by the municipality, offered all the conditions for the construction of the modern school with spacious schoolyard. It was necessary, since the number of students constantly grew. For example, the population in Belgrade in the first half of the 19th century, when the school was erected, was 8,450, and in 1900 even 69,769, one third of whom lived in this urban quarter. Apart from the number of the population, that is, the students, the construction of the new building was influenced by the other needs of the modern school system, and the old building was not satisfactory at all. The first modern school buildings in Belgrade were erected in Dorćol and Palilula in 1894, and ten years later the construction of the elementary school in the vicinity of the Cathedral Church began.

=== Characteristics ===
Teacher Stevan Todorović introduced gym classes, for the first time in Serbia. The first basketball match in Belgrade was played in the schoolyard in 1923. Later on, the students of this school, Zoran Slavnić and Dragan Kapičić, as well as many other students, became excellent basketball players of the Yugoslav basketball national team. Many important people, who through their work contributed to the construction and the development of this school make the school specific and valuable. For many years, this school has been the most reputable school in Serbia.

In 1871, when the teacher notebooks (dnevnik) were introduced, the teachers fiercely protested claiming it is a "major waste of time, an additional expense and damage, without any benefits". In 2017, the electronic notebooks replaced the paper ones. Ivan Meštrović sculptured the Pobednik monument in the school gym, which is today used as the festivity hall. Erected in 1928, Pobednik is today the most representative landmark of Belgrade.

A bust of king Peter was placed on the small square, right from the school's main entrance. It was erected in 2011. The stone plinth was carved by Branimir Radisavljević, while the bust was sculptured by Dušan Jovanović Đukin. The original plinth was deemed too low, so during the complete renovation in 2020, the plinth's height was elevated.

=== Names ===
The school changed its name several times. Among others, it was called "King Petar I", and after the World War II "Braća Ribar". In 1993 the name was reverted to "King Petar I":

- 1718–1839 - Small Serbian school in Belgrade
- 1839–1844 - Town's Normal School in Belgrade
- 1844–1878 - Elementary school near the Cathedral Church
- 1878–1925 - Elementary male and female school near the Cathedral Church
- 1925–1945 - Elementary School "King Petar I"
- 1945–1952 - Elementary School No. 1
- 1952–1993 - Elementary School "Braća Ribar"
- Since 1993 - Elementary School "King Petar I"

=== Present ===
As the first school was established in 1718, the generation 2017/18, with 96 pupils, was officially numbered as the 300th generation. It was projected for 1,000 pupils but in the past several decades, the numbers are smaller than that. The school had 555 pupils in 2017 and 584 in 2018. The school is today organized in two buildings. The school building is for the "junior classes" (I-IV, 7–10 years) and has classes only in morning shifts. "Senior classes" (V-VIII, 11–14 years) go the other building in the Maršala Birjuzova street. In 2017 Dr. Milutin Tadić, professor at the University of Belgrade's Geography Faculty donated a wall sun clock which was placed on this building. The clock shows hours and seasons.

On 22 October 2018, the school ceremonially celebrated its 300th anniversary with the festivity held in the Dom Sindikata. It was a part of the wider, several weeks longer celebration. First was the Week of Science, centered on scientists Milutin Milanković, Mihajlo Pupin and Mihajlo Petrović Alas, former student of the school. Second week was dedicated to sports, including the basketball match of the junior teams of KK Crvena Zvezda and KK Partizan, as the first basketball match ever in Belgrade was played in the school. Third week was dedicated to the artist and other culture representatives who used to be school's students.

== Building ==
=== Author ===
Јеlisaveta Načić, who designed the school, was the first woman to graduate in architecture in Serbia and belonged to the first generation of architects educated in Serbia at the newly-founded Department of Architecture at the Technical Faculty of the Great School. She graduated in 1900. The fact that she enrolled to the university was a huge rarity in a country where, in the late 19th and early 20th century, only 7 percent of women were literate. Јеlisaveta Načić moved the boundaries by her employment as well. For two years she worked as a technical apprentice in the Ministry of Construction, and she spent her entire career in the engineering-architectural department of the Belgrade Municipality – a precedent, since the jobs in the public service were reserved for men, and only for those who served military service.

Along with Draga Ljočić, she paved the way to the employment of women in public sector. Since her career was interrupted by the World War I, and Načić for a short time managed to finish many designs, she was innovative and brave in her projects, and she managed to try working in different fields of her profession. She was pretty successful in urbanism and designing of private, public and sacral structures. After the imprisonment in the concentration camp in Nezsider, Hungary (today Neusiedl am See, Austria), where she met an Albanian poet and revolutionary, Luka Lukai, she got married, gave birth to a daughter and left Belgrade and designing for good. Nevertheless, Jelisaveta Načić managed to give Belgrade an architectural masterpiece – the building of King Petar I Elementary School, which at the time was called "Elementary School in the vicinity of the Orthodox Cathedral". Although very young when she designed it (right after her graduation), she managed to create a mature, composed, functional and aesthetically designed achievement.

=== Construction ===
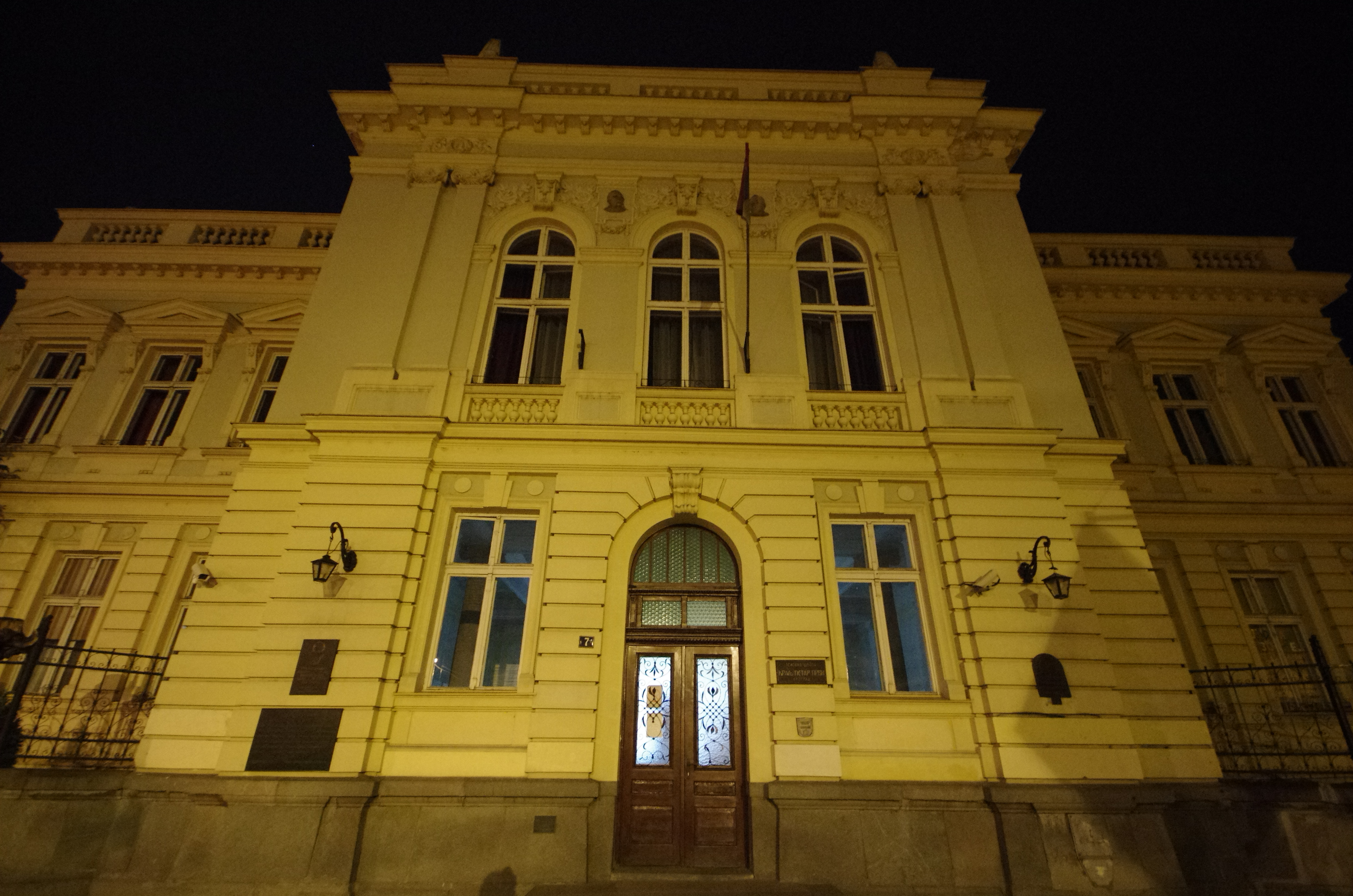
The school at night

The construction of such a huge building in the Belgrade of that time with mainly ground-floored objects, was complex and expensive enterprise, financed by the Municipality of Belgrade with 280.000 dinars. For this project, the Municipality hired its own architect, Јеlisaveta Načić, and Belgrade constructors and craftsmen took part in the construction: the construction undertaker Nikola Vitorović, cabinetwork was done by Voja St. Janković`s workshop, the central heating and the electrical installations were done by the undertaker company „Andra Ristić and comp.“, the masonry was the work of the „Ripanj granite industry“, so the school near the Orthodox Cathedral was almost completely the product of domestic industry.

The building was constructed on the sloping ground of the highest part of Sava slope, by the most modern construction procedures, and it consists of a basement, semi-basement, a ground floor and the first floor. The building consists of three tracts, the most important and the most representative of which was set up sidelong, on the corner of the Gračanička Street and Kralja Petra Street, thus creating in front of it a triangular square. From the backyard side there was a wing set up in the shape of the letter G, which along with the classroom tract makes a small inner courtyard.

The elementary school "King Petar I" is shaped according to all postulates of the academic architecture, with the Art Nouveau elements, which are reflected in the interior more than on the facades. The facades facing the street are done in three, that is, in two girths, with the dividing wreaths between the floor and with the large roof wreath ending in the attic with balustrade. The representative entrance protruding bay with tall arched windows of the auditorium on the first floor dominates the main façade. On the sides, the dynamics was achieved with the protruding bay highlighted with the triangular sills above the windows on the first floor and some calmly shaped gaps of the ground floor. The yard facades are more modest.

The stylistic processing in the interior is first of all noticeable in the profiling of all supporting and protuberant elements and in the frames of the walls. Completely geometrized decorative elements appear, as well as the stylistic elements of classical origin. The equipment of the school "King Petar I", as far as the hygienic and teaching conditions are concerned, was the reflection of the most modern achievements of that time. The school had a plumbing installations with English toilets, electrical lighting, central heating system and the installation which enabled the ventilation of the rooms. The doors and the windows of a typical appearance and dimensions at a short distance provide for a very good lighting of the rooms, as well as the backyard windows on the shaded sides.

The building managed to avoid the fate of almost all other representative buildings in Belgrade as it wasn't damaged in World War I while in World War II it was damaged on 20 October 1944, the very day Belgrade was liberated from the German occupation. In the post-war period, after 1950, all the installations were modernized. The school furniture was replaced with a more modern one.

=== Cultural Monument ===
Based on its functional and aesthetic values the elementary school building is considered as its most important part. It was conceived as two-storey building with three facades facing the street. The representative entrance protruding bay with arched gaps, topped with the attic with balustrade dominates the main facade. Shaped according to the postulates of the academic architecture with the art nouveau elements, which reflect in the interior more than on the facades, the elementary school building represents the important creation not only in relation to the creation of the school buildings, but as the part of Belgrade architecture in general.

== Importance ==
The building of the elementary school "King Petar I" represents an important achievement not only in the architecture of school buildings, but in Belgrade architecture in general. According to the Decision made by the Cultural Heritage Protection Institute of the City of Belgrade no. 278/7 from 25 December 1965, the building was designated as a cultural monument. As the classification was newly introduced, the school is listed as No. 1 on the list of cultural monuments.

=== Alumni ===
Alumni include scientists, philosophers, royals, actors, athletes, revolutionaries, painters: Мihailo Petrović Alas, King Peter I of Serbia, Stevan Stojanović Mokranjac, Moša Pijade, Pavle Savić, Dejan Udovičić, Ivo Lola and Јurica Ribar, Vladeta Jerotić, Svetozar Gligorić, Ružica Sokić, Nikola Simić, Minja Subota.
