= Vojin Popović =

Serbian voivode (military commander) (1881-1916)

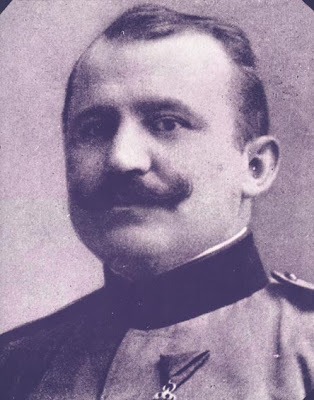
- Vojvoda Vojin Popović
- Born: 9 December 1881; Sjenica, Kosovo Vilayet, Ottoman Empire
- Died: 29 November 1916 (aged 34); Gruništa
- Military career
- Allegiance: Kingdom of Serbia
- Service years: 1901–1916 †
- Rank: Voivode (Duke); Second lieutenant
- Unit: (Chetniks) Volunteer unit
- Conflicts: Macedonian Struggle; Balkan Wars; World War I; Battle of Kajmakčalan

Vojin Popović, known as Vojvoda Vuk (Serbian: Војин Поповић, војвода Вук; 9 December 1881 – 29 November 1916) was a Serbian voivode (military commander), who fought for the Macedonian Serb Chetniks (i.e. komiti) in the Struggle for Macedonia, and then the Serbian national army in the Balkan Wars and World War I.

== Life ==
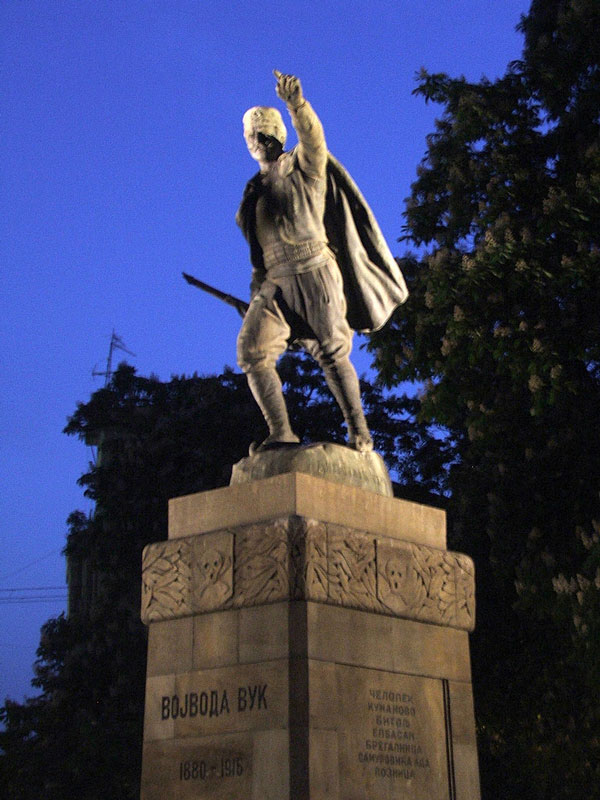
Monument, in Belgrade

Vojin was born on 9 December 1881 at Sjenica, Kosovo Vilayet, Ottoman Empire (present-day southwestern Serbia). Shortly after his birth, the family moved to Kragujevac, where Vojin attended school. He chose a career in the military. On 3 November 1901, he became second lieutenant. He was among the first cheta (bands, 'čete') heading for Old Serbia, i.e. Makedonia (1905).

He was killed after being shot through the heart on top of the Staravinski vis near Gruništa, Novaci Municipality in skirmishes after the Battle of Kaymakchalan on 29 November 1916 during the height of World War I. There is a Monument to Vojvoda Vuk in Belgrade.

== Legacy ==
- There is a Monument to Vojvoda Vuk in a Belgrade park called Proleće.

== See also ==
- List of Chetnik voivodes

== Sources ==
- Трифуновић, Илија (December 1998) [1939]. "КЛОНУ РУКА У ВОЈВОДЕ ВУКА". Srpsko nasleđe (in Serbian). НИП „ГЛАС“.
