= Park Proleće =

Park in Belgrade, Serbia

- Парк Пролеће
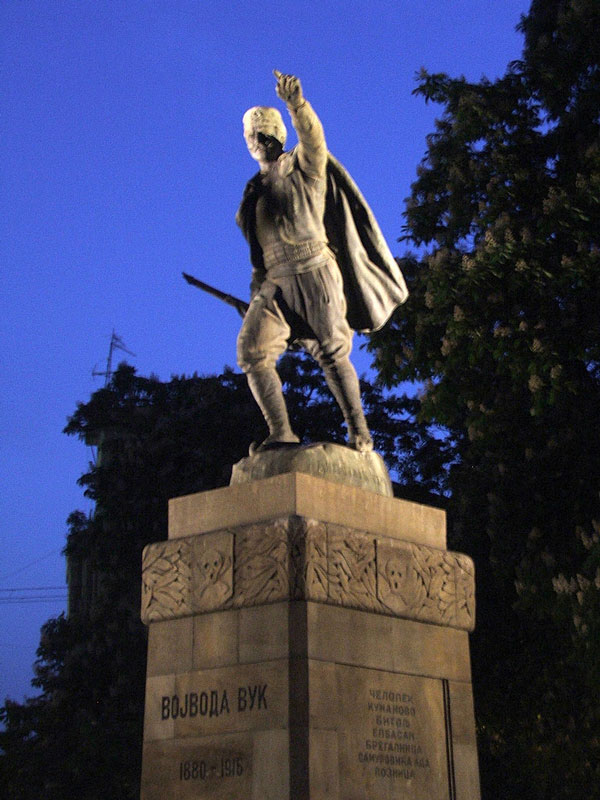
- Monument to Vojvoda Vuk in the park

- Location within Belgrade
- Type: city park
- Location: Stari Grad, Belgrade
- Coordinates: 44.81658°N 20.45512°E
- Area: 3,700 m^{2} (40,000 sq ft)
- Created: 1936
- Open: Open all year

Park Proleće or Park Vojvoda Vuk (Serbian: Парк Пролеће / Парк Војводе Вука) is one of the parks in downtown Belgrade, the capital of Serbia. It is located in the municipality of Stari Grad. It is also colloquially called Park on Topličin Venac. The roughly triangularly shaped park is one of the smallest in the central area of Belgrade, with an area of 3,700 m^{2} (40,000 sq ft).

== Location ==
Park Proleće is located in the south central part of Stari Grad. It is encircled with the streets of Carice Milice on the east, Topličin Venac on the south and west and Vuka Karadžića on the north. East of the park is the Tanjug Building while on the north is the kafana Proleće. Museum of Applied Arts is also on the north while Hotel Palace is on the west. It is directly connected to the Knez Mihailova Street 50 m (160 ft) to the northeast and Obilićev Venac on the east.

== History ==
Beneath the park are remains of the urban zone of Singidunum, Roman predecessor of Belgrade. Just like the discovered underground remains on the nearby square of Studentski Trg, they were conserved and reburied.

Location was part of the Šanac ("trench"), the protective trench built on the orders by the Austrian Generalissimo Ernst Gideon von Laudon during the Austrian occupation of northern Serbia from 1717 to 1739. Belgrade's first chief urbanist, Emilijan Josimović, devised a plan in 1867 for the system of "green groves" along the former route of the trench, which now divided old part of the city from the newer neighborhoods. The green belt was also to include avenues, promenades, etc. The plan was only partially conducted at the time, while the only two surviving parts of the plan are two small squares, at Topličin Venac, where the park is, and at Republic Square, in front of the Central Military Club building.

At the corner of the modern park, industrialist Milan Vapa founded the first paper mill in Belgrade in 1905. In 1907 he relocated it to Kalenića Guvno.

It is not known when it was formed, but the park, though unarranged, existed prior to 1914 and the World War I. It was one of the open spaces where the revolutionaries of Young Bosnia gathered prior to the Assassination in Sarajevo in June 1914. They were concerned that they might be overheard by spies in the neighboring kafanas, so they made plans in city parks. However, the claim that the idea of the assassination itself was conceived in this park, can't be confirmed by historiography.

After the Austrian-German offensive and the ensuing bloody street by street battle in 1915, especially in this and Dorćol area, an improvised Austrian-German military graveyard was located here as it was one of the rare green areas in the city at the time. It was removed in 1915-1916 when the memorial drinking fountain was built in the park by the occupational forces, commemorating the fallen soldiers during the battles for Belgrade. It had Austro-Hungarian symbols - crossed arms, a helmet and the motto of the empire Viribus Unitis. Despite having the ornamentation of the enemy army, the fountain survived until 1928, 10 years after the Belgrade was liberated.

In the central area of the park, there is a monument to military commander Vojin Popović (1881-1916), who was nicknamed Vojvoda Vuk. It was sculptured by Đorđe Jovanović in 1922, but was placed in the park on 10 October 1936. The monument has a skull with crossed bones on two sides. They are markings of the Chetniks guerilla from the 1903-1918 period, but were adopted by the Chetniks in World War II. Still, after the Communists, rivals of the Chetniks, took over in 1945, they didn't tear down the monument.

In June 2009, an internet park with the free Wi-Fi internet, was set in the park.

On 30 August 2021, city assembly voted to erect a monument in Topličin Venac, dedicated to the writer and humorist Duško Radović.

== Name ==
The park has been named Proleće (spring), after the kafana of the same name located there since 1870. It later became especially popular among the professors and students of the Belgrade University. Present restaurant was built in the 1950s.

Since the monument has been built, the park was colloquially named after Vojvoda Vuk, and is also called the Park at Topličin Venac, after its location.

== 2018–2019 reconstruction ==
In 2017 the central pedestrian zone along the Knez Mihailova was expanded into the both Vuka Karadžića and Obilićev Venac streets so the park was envisioned to become the part of the zone and to blend in it. Reconstruction was projected by architect Boris Podrecca as an homage to Olga Jevrić, described by Podrecca as the best Serbian female sculptor.

The refurbished park is planned to have a new fountain, green pergolas, children playground, small staircase with inscriptions representing lyrics from the most popular Serbian poets and 10 Jevrić's sculptures. Jevrić, who died in 2014, bequeathed 147 of her works to the Serbian Academy of Sciences and Arts, which formed a legacy which was declared a cultural monument. In principle, the Academy agreed to cede the sculptures.

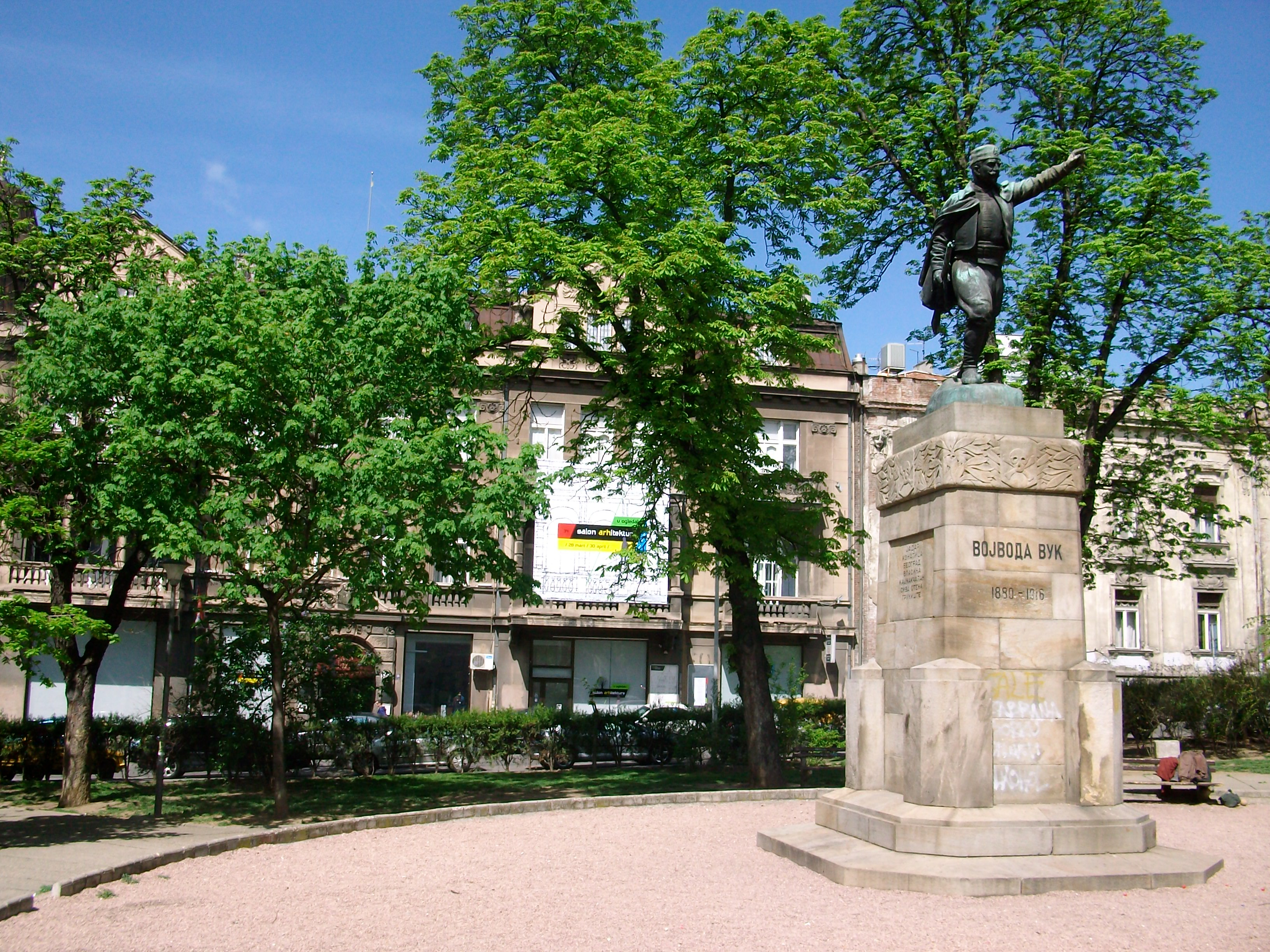
View on the Museum of Applied Arts from the park

The concrete pathways will be replaced with the stone dust. The surrounding streets, whether part of the pedestrian zone or open for traffic, will be paved with stone slabs. The reconstruction should last from April to the autumn of 2018. However, the works didn't start as planned and the reconstruction began suddenly on 21 September 2018, without any official announcement, with a deadline in July 2019. The project includes also the surrounding streets. The streets of Vuka Karadžića and part of Topličin Venac will be adapted into the extended pedestrian zone, while the remaining streets around the park will become a traffic calming zone.

Cutting some of the trees, transforming the park into the mini square and cutting it off from the traffic is part of the wider action by the city government to close the entire downtown for traffic and pave green areas with granite slabs. Local residents began to protest even before the works started, but the protesting became physical since September 2018. Described as employing the "guerrilla tactics", the residents organized signing of the petitions on the square, organizing protests on the location and 24-hours a day "guards", forming human chains, blocking the machines and also blocking and escorting workers from the construction site as they had no official work orders. There were even physical skirmishes with a group of anonymous non-residents who gathered and engaged the protesters. Apart from the urban, traffic, aesthetic and humane reasons, one of the objections included the price: on average, renovation of 100 m (330 ft) of the street would cost €850,000. As the protests were held concurrently with the protests at the Republic Square, against the square's renovation project, city assembly adopted a "conclusion" that city will sue everyone blocking the works.

However the protest continued and on 30 May 2019 city announced that the Podrecca's project will be abandoned: trees won't be cut, the park will remain with added trees, it won't be part of the widened pedestrian zone while it remained unclear where the Jevrić's sculptures will be exhibited. Residents quit the blockade and the new deadline was set for 1 September 2019, when the reconstructed park was reopened. New, much cheaper project of the more greener park with an open-air stage and the streets open for traffic around it, was presented in June 2019.
