= Palace of the Patriarchate, Belgrade =

Building in Belgrade, Serbia

Palace of the Patriarchate
- Патријаршијски двор Patrijaršijski dvor
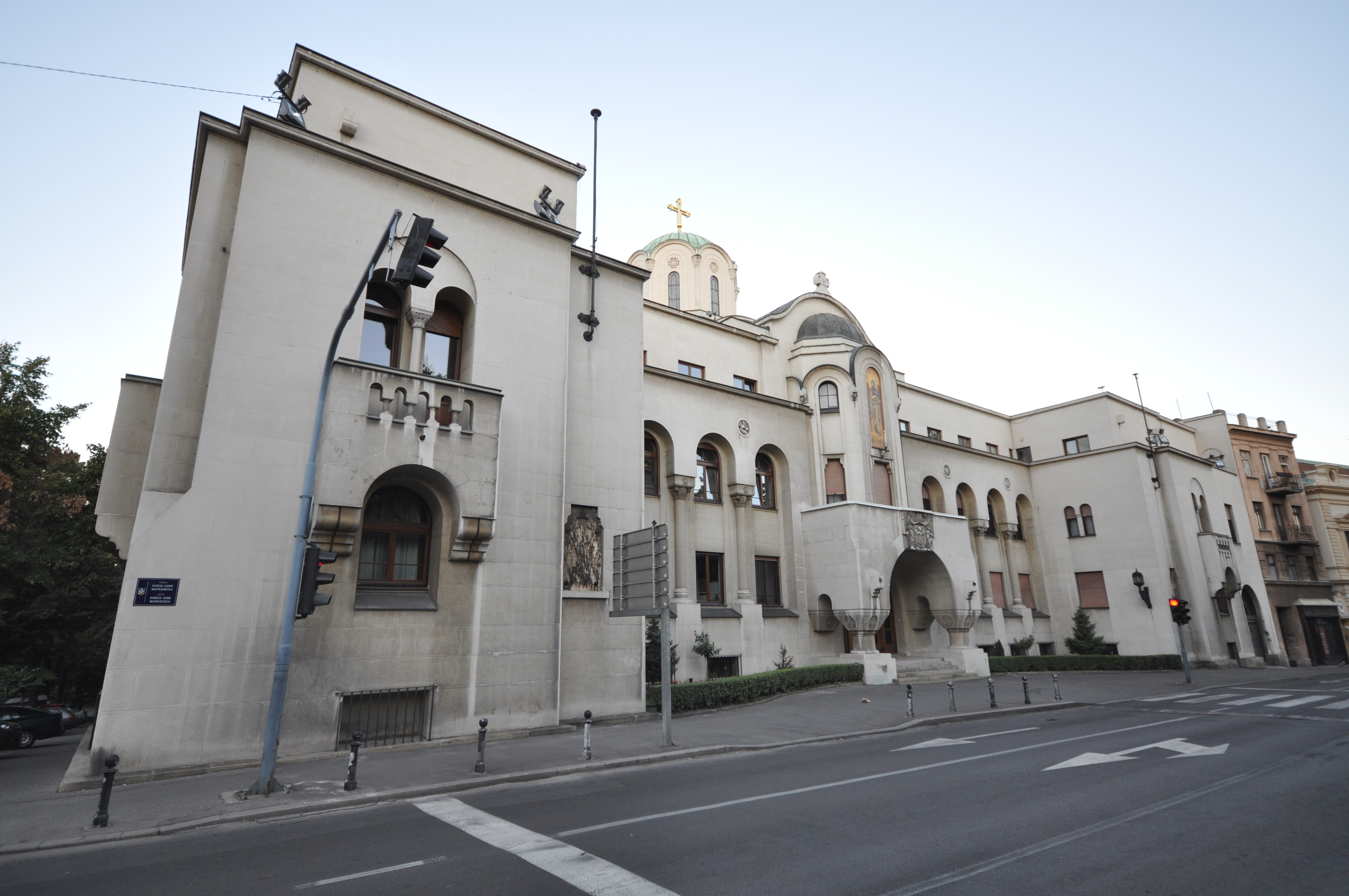
- Palace of the Patriarchate

- Location within Belgrade

General information
- Status: Completed
- Location: Stari Grad, Belgrade, Serbia
- Coordinates: 44.8176°N 20.4516°E
- Current tenants: Serbian Orthodox Church
- Construction started: 1932
- Completed: 1935
- Opened: 1935; 91 years ago
- Owner: Serbian Orthodox Church

Design and construction
- Architect: Viktor Lukomski

The Palace of the Patriarchate (Serbian: Патријаршијски двор, romanized: Patrijaršijski dvor), also known as the Patriarchate Building (Serbian: Зграда Патријаршије, romanized: Zgrada Patrijaršije), is the administrative seat of the Serbian Orthodox Church and its head, the Serbian Patriarch, located in Belgrade, Serbia.

The building is protected as a cultural heritage site of exceptional importance and is located right across the street from the Cathedral of Saint Archangel Michael.

== History ==
=== Metropolitanate building ===
The lot on which the building stands today was bought by the Serbian state in 1818. One of the konaks of Prince Miloš Obrenović was located there. The building which was the seat of the Metropolitanate of Belgrade was built in 1863. It was a one-storey building, with simplified and reduced ornaments on the façade. Though modest in terms of architectural value, it was important historically. Before it was demolished to make room for the new building, Patriarch Varnava commissioned the painter Kosta Hakman to paint the edifice. Hakman made two paintings in 1933, one of the central building and another of a small auxiliary kitchen object. Popular myth at the time claimed that in the kitchen object, the severed head of Karađorđe was kept in 1817, before Miloš Obrenović sent it to Istanbul. The paintings are kept in the Museum of the Patriarchate at the Palace of the Patriarchate in Sremski Karlovci.

=== Construction ===
Serbian Orthodox Church adopted the new constitution in 1930. Article 48 called for the construction of the new seat of the Palace of the Patriarchate in the neighborhood of Savinac, on the Vračar Plateau. In the process, the church also decided to demolish the old Metropolitanate building in Kosančićev Venac and build the new one. As the project on Vračar was envisioned as a monumental one, it was decided that the new Metropolitanate building will be constructed first. Further problem was caused by the slow and uncertain construction of the, also monumentally planned, Church of Saint Sava, which drained the largest funds, postponing the construction of other planned sacral objects. Additionally, the old Metropolitanate building was in bad shape anyway so it got a priority and was to serve as the temporary seat of the church until the project on Savinac is finished.

The building is a project of the Russian émigré architect Viktor Lukomski. Among other buildings, he designed the small Church of Saint Sava on Vračar, the eponymous hotel on the Avala Mountain and Kraljevski Dvor within the Dedinje Royal Compound in Dedinje. The plan was finished in 1932 when the construction began. By 1933 the old Metropolitanate building was demolished and the new edifice was finished in 1935. After it was completed, the government said that there is no more money left for another, monumental administrative church building, implying that the new building is quite suitable to be the seat of the entire Serbian Orthodox Church, not just one of its eparchies. Though even today one lot next to the Church of Saint Sava is reserved for the planned building, the construction never started.

During the digging for the foundations, the underground corridors, or lagums were discovered. They connected the Residence of Princess Ljubica, Cathedral of Saint Archangel Michael and the Metropolitanate building. They were dug on the orders from Prince Miloš, so that he could meet with the leaders of the church, unbeknownst to the Ottomans who ruled Serbia at the time. The lagums were used by the builders of the new edifice to conduct the heating pipes.

== Architecture ==
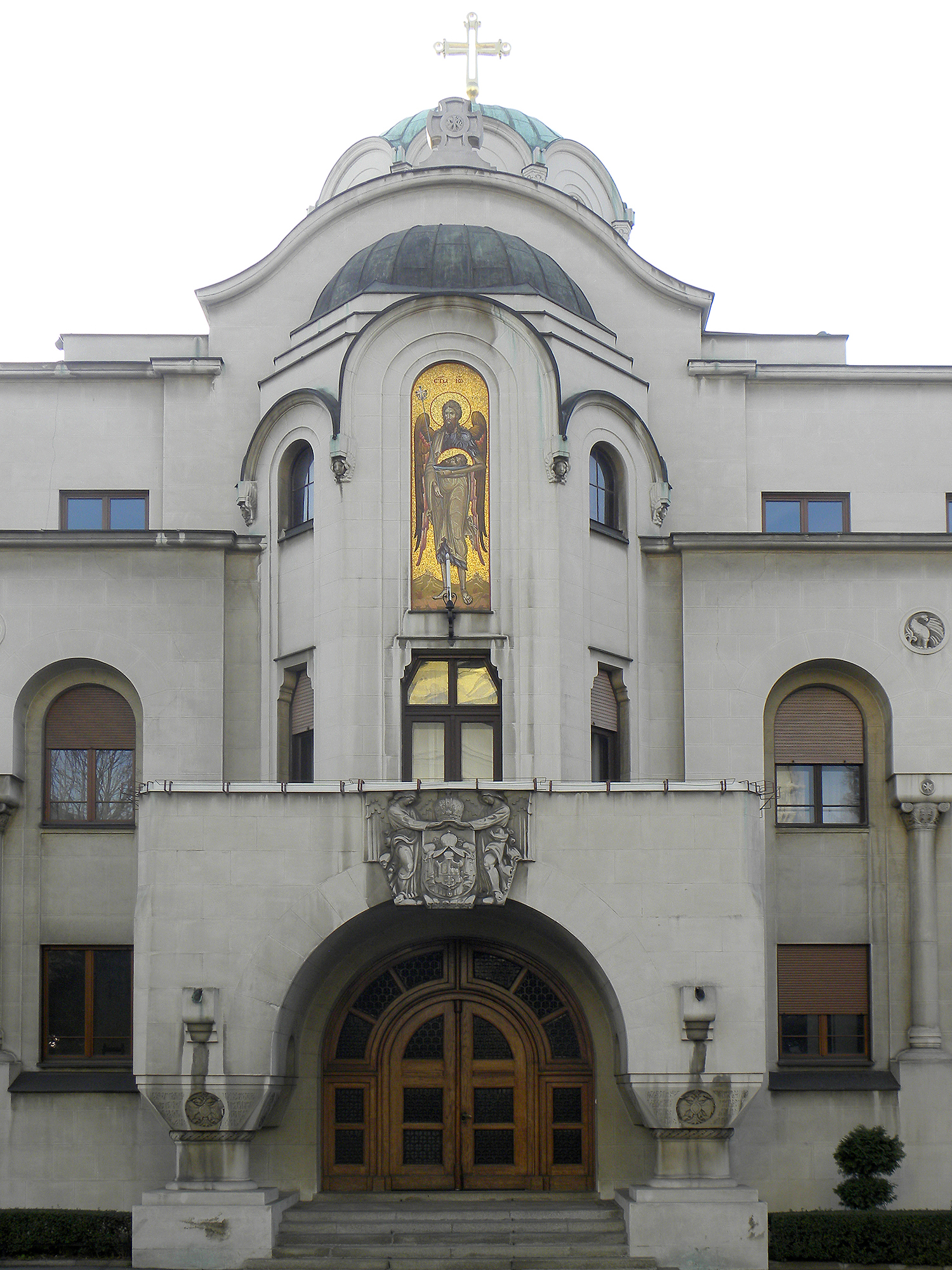
The front façade

The function of the building influenced the style. In his project, Lukomski adjusted the bulky Academism to the modernized Serbo-Byzantine Revival style in his own, free interpretation. His solution was original, but complex and heterogeneous, as he needed to satisfy his conservative patrons. The building has a rectangular base and is solidly and sturdily built.

National style is observed in the pyramidal structure of the parts of the building and their step-like placement onto each other, arches and arched niches, consoles, and the details of the decoration. Academism can be seen in the disposition of the base, layout of the rooms, division of the façade into three horizontal zones, regularly shaped openings, prominence of the garlands that divide the sections of the façade and the strict use of backspace ornaments. The modernist influence of the day is evident in the simple and neutral surface of the façade and characteristic rectangular windows on the highest floor of the side wings. Due to the significant decline of the terrain, as the entire neighborhood of Kosančićev Venac is on the mass-wasting prone slope of the Sava River, the edifice has an uneven number of floors on the lateral, lengthwise sides.

The interior design, though representatively shaped, has a certain austerity due to the function of the building. The basement and the ground floor are reserved for the various institutes of the Serbian Orthodox Church, offices, archives, and the premises of the Spiritual Court. The entire first floor constitutes the quarters of the Patriarch. It consists of the Patriarch's apartment, cabinet, chapel, library, dining room, reception hall, and apartments for the guests. On the second floor, there are working offices and halls for the sessions of the various councils and the Synod. In the largest hall, there is a famous painting "Migration of the Serbs" by Paja Jovanović, hanging on the wall. An annex with the apartments for the ecclesial dignitaries leans on the eastern block of the edifice.

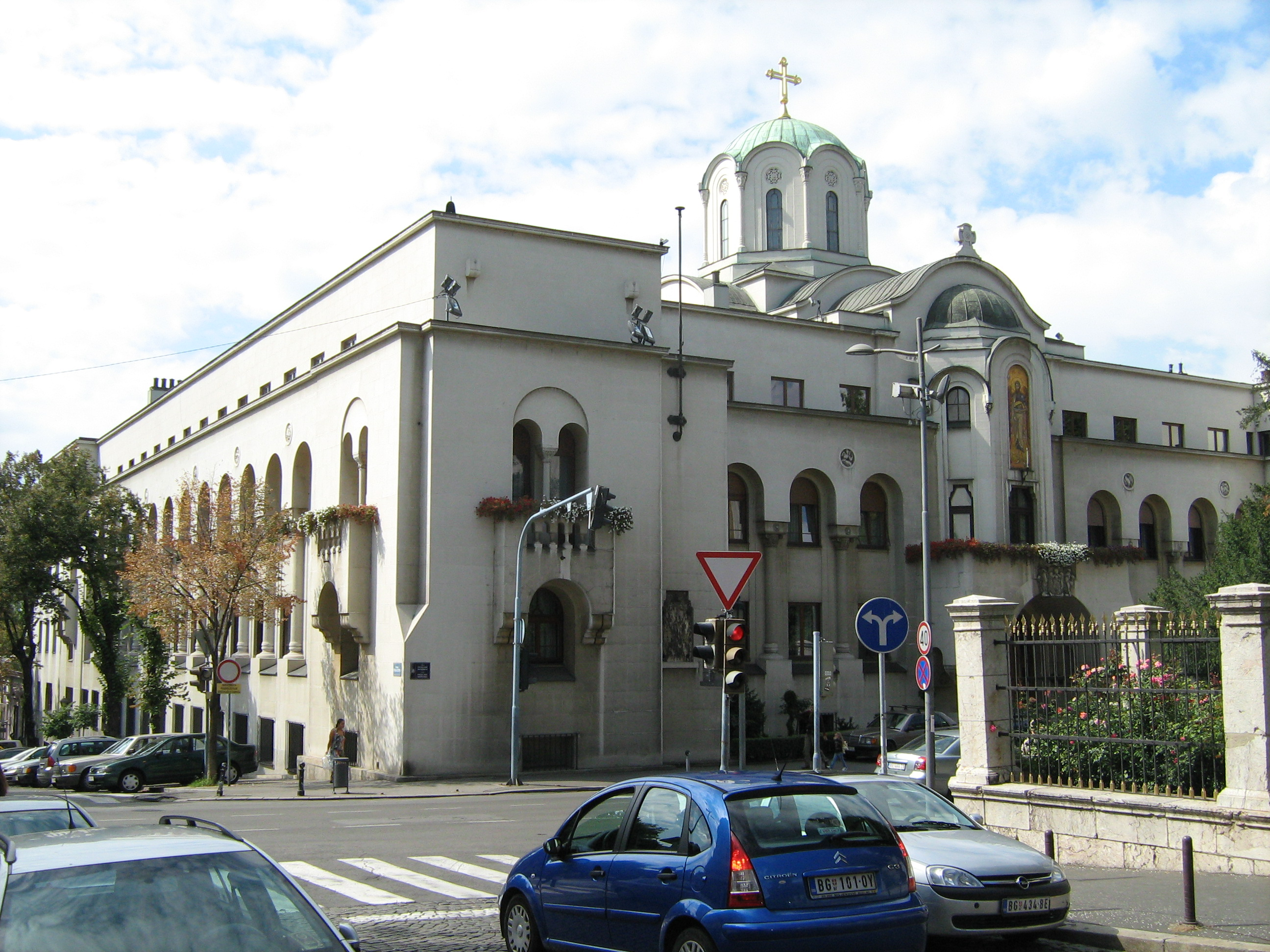
View from the Kralja Petra Street

The front façade, facing the Cathedral of Saint Archangel Michael, is marked by the massive portico with the decorated and arch-like portal. The portal's prominence is accentuated by the characteristic, deformed short columns, which are a common and recognizable motif of the church architecture projected by the Russian émigré architects. Two other distinctive objects on the portal are the coat of arms and a mosaic. The relief coat of arms of the Patriarchate was done by the sculptor Vladimir Zagorodnjuk and is located above the semicircular entrance. The composition represents two angels which are crowning the coat of arms with the episcopal mitre. On the upper section of the front façade, in the niche above the portal, there is a large, elongated mosaic representing John the Baptist. It was made on the draft by the painter Vladimir Predojević.

When finished, the building was praised, both by the public and the press, which described it as an "imposing, magnificent edifice" and that its "simplified Neo-Byzantine style fits into the sacral area of Belgrade".

== Complex ==
=== Chapel ===
In the inner yard, east of the building, there is a chapel dedicated to Saint Simeon the Myroblyte, with the large dome above it. In the chapel there is a woodcut iconostasis, made by the masters from Ohrid, with the icons painted by Predojević in 1935.

=== Museum ===
The Museum of the Serbian Orthodox Church is situated in the northern block of the building. Its rich collection has a significant religious, cultural and historical value. Though majority of the preparatory work has been done by the Patriarch Varnava and professor Radoslav Grujić, the museum was officially open during the tenure of Patriarch Vikentije II in 1954. Bulk of the exhibits comes from the churches and monasteries in Syrmia and Fruška Gora which were looted by the Ustaše during the World War II. The exhibits were returned from Zagreb after the war.

The collection consists of the religious paintings, portraits of the church dignitaries, old Serbian engravings, handwritten and printed srbuljas, numerous chasubles, sacral objects, votive offerings, religious embroideries, seals, historical documents, etc. The most valuable artifacts include the rich collection of Byzantine-style icons from the period of Ottoman rule, the robe of Prince Lazar with his heraldic mark on the buttons (a helmet with the ox horns), the shroud of King Milutin and a glass donated to the Mileševa Monastery by Ivan the Terrible in 1558 (his grandmother was Serbian noble Ana Jakšić).

=== Library ===
The Library of the Serbian Orthodox Church occupies the central south part of the edifice. Its collection is the oldest library in Serbia. Some of the books originate from the period of the Patriarch Arsenije III Čarnojević, who took them with him from the Patriarchate of Peć monastery when the Great Migrations of the Serbs from Kosovo began in 1690.

== See also ==
- Palace of the Patriarchate, Sremski Karlovci
- Serbian Patriarch

== Literature ==
- Aleksandar Kadijević, "Beogradski period rada arhitekte Viktora Viktoroviča Lukomskog (1920–1943), GGB, XLV–XLVI, Belgrade, 1998/1999,115–132.
- Marko Popović, "Heraldički simboli na javnim zdanjima Beograda", Beelgrade, 1997.
- Branko Vujović, "Beograd - kulturna riznica", Belgrade, 2003.
- Svetozar Dušanić, "Muzej Srpske pravoslavne crkve", Belgrade, 2008.
- Group of authors, "Kosančićev venac", Belgrade, 1979.
