= Cathedral of Saint Archangel Michael, Belgrade =

Cathedral in Belgrade, Serbia

Cathedral of Saint Archangel Michael
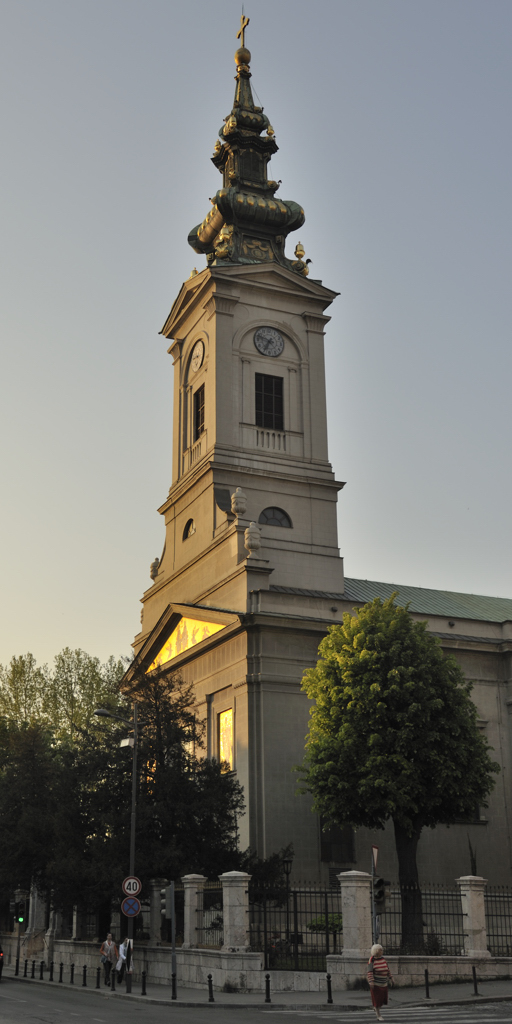
- Cathedral of Saint Archangel Michael, pictured in 2009
- Cathedral of Saint Archangel Michael
- 44°49′05″N 20°27′08″E
- Location: Belgrade
- Country: Serbia
- Denomination: Serbian Orthodox Church
- Website: saborna-crkva.com

History
- Status: Church
- Founded: 1837
- Dedication: Saint Michael the Archangel

Architecture
- Functional status: Active
- Heritage designation: Heritage Site of Exceptional Importance
- Designated: 1979
- Architect: Adam Friedrich Kwerfeld
- Style: Neoclassicism with late baroque elements
- Completed: 1840

The Cathedral of Saint Archangel Michael (Serbian: Саборна црква Светог Архангела Михаила, romanized: Saborna crkva Svetog Arhangela Mihaila), commonly known as the Cathedral church (Serbian: Саборна црква, romanized: Saborna crkva), is an Eastern Orthodox church located in Belgrade, Serbia. It is under jurisdiction of the Archdiocese of Belgrade and Karlovci of the Serbian Orthodox Church and serves as its cathedral church.

The church is one of the few preserved buildings in Belgrade from the first half of the 19th century and is protected as a cultural heritage site of exceptional importance. It is located right across the street from the Palace of the Patriarchate.

== History ==
=== Old church ===
There was an older church, dedicated to Saint Archangel Michael, at the site of today's church. Protestant priest and a writer on travel Stephan Gerlach provided valuable records of its looks in his descriptions of travels of the Emperor's delegates to Istanbul, 1573–1578. Although spacious, with all necessary liturgical accessories and furniture, it was not large enough to receive all the Christian citizens of Belgrade.

Later records of existence of this church were mainly saved by travel writers from the 17th and 18th centuries. During the Austro–Turkish conflicts in the beginning of the 18th century it was destroyed, and the Austrian authorities were explicit in their order not to restore the damaged Serbian churches. Former Metropolitan Mojsije Petrović, who had expected the support of Russian Czar Peter The Great, who had meanwhile died, started renewal of the Church from its foundations, decorating it with a new iconostasis.

Following the Treaty of Belgrade concluded in 1739, Ottoman Turks once again entered Belgrade (until then capital of the Kingdom of Serbia, officially created in 1718) and "as soon as they entered the town they showed their anger toward Serbs and Serbian relics on this occasion". Impressive residence of Serbian Metropolitan was torn down, and the church was "robbed and its roof torn down". Few decades later, at the beginning of 1798, the church once again suffered from damage, this time from fire. Repaired for services it served until the beginning of 1813, when after breaking of the First Serbian Uprising Turks desecrated and robbed it. Necessary restoration work was performed after the Second Serbian Uprising.

Following the Sultan's Hatisheriff on the day of St. Andrew in 1830, which granted Serbs the freedom to perform the religious service, and by the order of Prince Miloš Obrenović a wooden bell tower was built beside the old church.

For the purpose of bell casting, a great fire was lit, which burned for three days. People would pass by and throw various silver objects to mould with bronze that was melting, so the bells would have "a more silvery" sound. Former Belgrade citizens were waiting for this happening "as for something great and unreachable. For them the sound of bells did not represent just an ordinary religious custom. The bells represented a symbol of centuries-expected victory". Decision brought by Prince Miloš was accepted among Turks with doubt and threat. An anecdote was saved until present days about a threat of Belgrade's vizier Husein-Pasha Gavanozoglu (1827–1833) referring to Duke Petar Čukić, who was in charge of construction of the bells, that he shall be punished for that. The Duke replied: "I know, I know efendi Pasha, if I raise them I shall die of Turkish hand, and if I do not, I shall die of hand of my master Prince Miloš. I prefer to die from a Turkish hand than from the hand of my master, as his disobedient servant.".

Today, the bell of the old cathedral church is situated in the bell tower of the Church of the Ascension along with four more historical bells, different in size and origin. This bell sounded for the first time on 15 February 1830 when Serbian Princedom got its autonomy. Destroyed and repaired, the old church had struggled until 22 June 1836, when, after numerous discussions, Prince Miloš ordered the church to be torn down and a new one constructed. Construction of the new cathedral church had begun on 28 April 1837. Its foundations were consecrated on 15 July 1837, a contemporary described as an exceptional happening, witnessed by Metropolitan Petar Jovanović, Church dignitaries of high rank, Princess Ljubica and successors Milan and Mihailo, serfs, children and "folk of both sexes". The cannons were roaring and people were saying "church blessing this happy and happier time". On the day of patron's feast day of the church, St. Archangel Michael, on 8 November 1845, Metropolitan Petar Jovanović has consecrated the finished church and served the first liturgy.

Although the author of the design remained controversial for a long time, it is certain that the Church was built by constructors from Pančevo, according to project made by Franz Jancke Friedrich Adam Querfeld.

=== New church ===
The cathedral was built between 1837 and 1840. The gold-plated carved iconostasis was made by the sculptor Dimitrije Petrović, while the icons on the iconostasis, thrones, choirs and pulpits, as well as those on the walls and arches were painted by Dimitrije Avramović, one of the most distinguished Serbian painters of the 19th century.

The cathedral church was one of the biggest religious buildings in Serbia, and after the Church of Peter and Paul in Topčider, the oldest in Belgrade.

The cathedral has a single nave construction with semi-circular apse on the East side and narthex on the West side above which the high bell tower is rising. The inner space is divided into the altar space, nave and narthex in which baptistery and stairs leading to bell tower are situated. Different from the North and South façade, shaped simply and in the same manner, the West façade is emphasized by distinct portal and wide entrance stairs. Architecture of the cathedral church directly adopted with its assembly and fine proportions the standards of neoclassical churches with recognizable baroque tower, that were built at the same time in Austria. Somewhat older cathedral church in Sremski Karlovci (1758), which also belongs to this group, could have been a possible model. Architecture of this church was used as a model in sacral architecture during the reign of Miloš Obrenović.

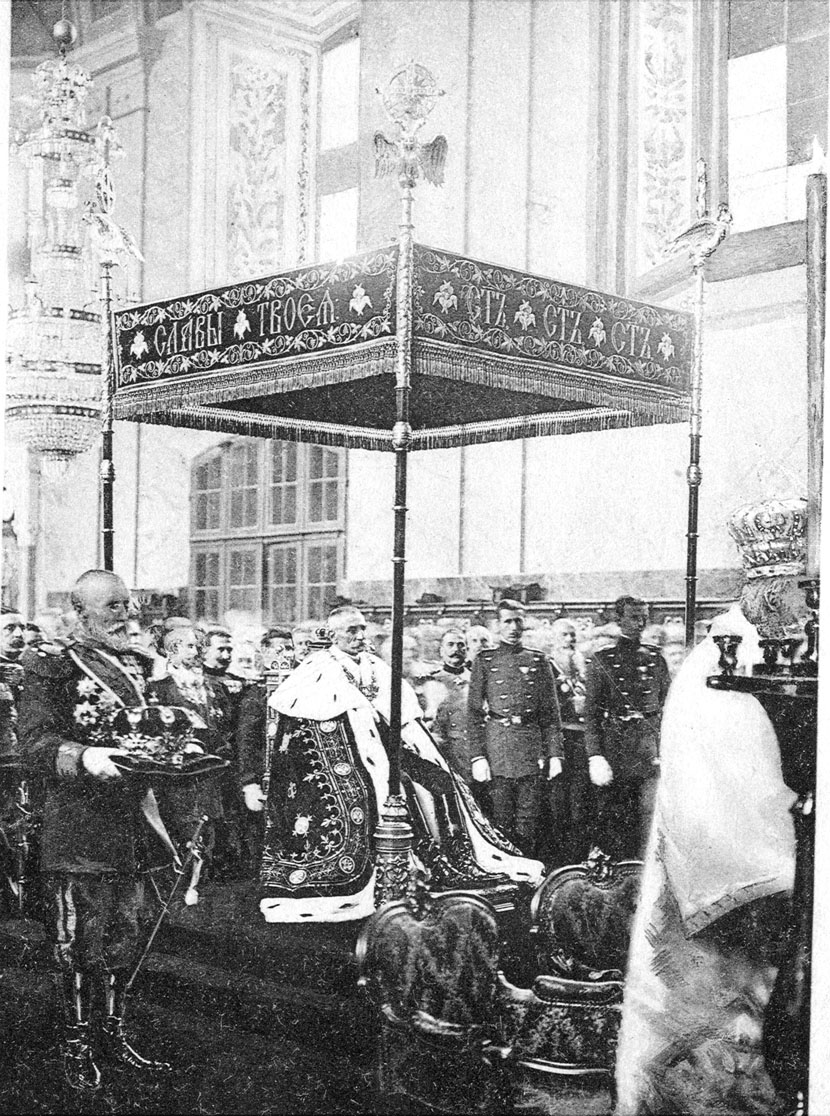
Coronation of King Peter I, 1904

Painting of the cathedral church was confided to one of the most famous 19th-century Serbian painters Dimitrije Avramović (1815–1855), who painted eighteen big wall compositions and almost fifty icons for iconostas during the period of 1841 to 1845. The artist was under the influence of the historical school of Vienna and German Nazarenes, but his distinct feeling for a dramatic colour scheme and plastic-dramatic rhythm created a recognizable Serbian manner. He has created unique monumental compositions of religious content at the walls of the cathedral church, highly evaluated in newer Serbian painting.

Besides painting, engraving works on the iconostasis, choir and pulpit, wall paintings, a treasury presents a special value, where applied art objects are kept – golden products from the 18th and 19th centuries, priests' garments, crosses, individual icons from second half of the 19th century and other objects of cultural historical importance.

In the vicinity of the Church, in today's Zadarska Street and part of Kralja Petra Street and Kosančićev Venac an old Serbian graveyard was situated. Its gradual broadening included the church yard of the cathedral, which was not fenced during the first decades of the 19th century and it served as a graveyard, where prominent Serbian persons of those times were buried.

The First Belgrade Singers Society, which is active today as well, was founded in 1853 at the church. This choir has been conducted by all distinguished composers of Serbian music, like Josif Marinković, Stevan Mokranjac, Kornelije Stanković, and others.

In 1961, during the 1st Summit of the Non-Aligned Movement, the President of Cyprus and the archbishop of the Church of Cyprus Makarios III led the liturgical celebration at the church alongside his official attendance of the conference.

== Relics ==
The special value of the church is its treasury, in which the relics of Serbian saints emperor Stefan Uroš V, parts of the relics of Lazar of Serbia, and despot Stefan Štiljanović.

== Tombs ==
- Prince Miloš Obrenović
- Prince Mihailo Obrenović
- Vuk Karadžić
- Dositej Obradović
- Patriarch Vikentije II
- Patriarch Gavrilo V

== Gallery ==
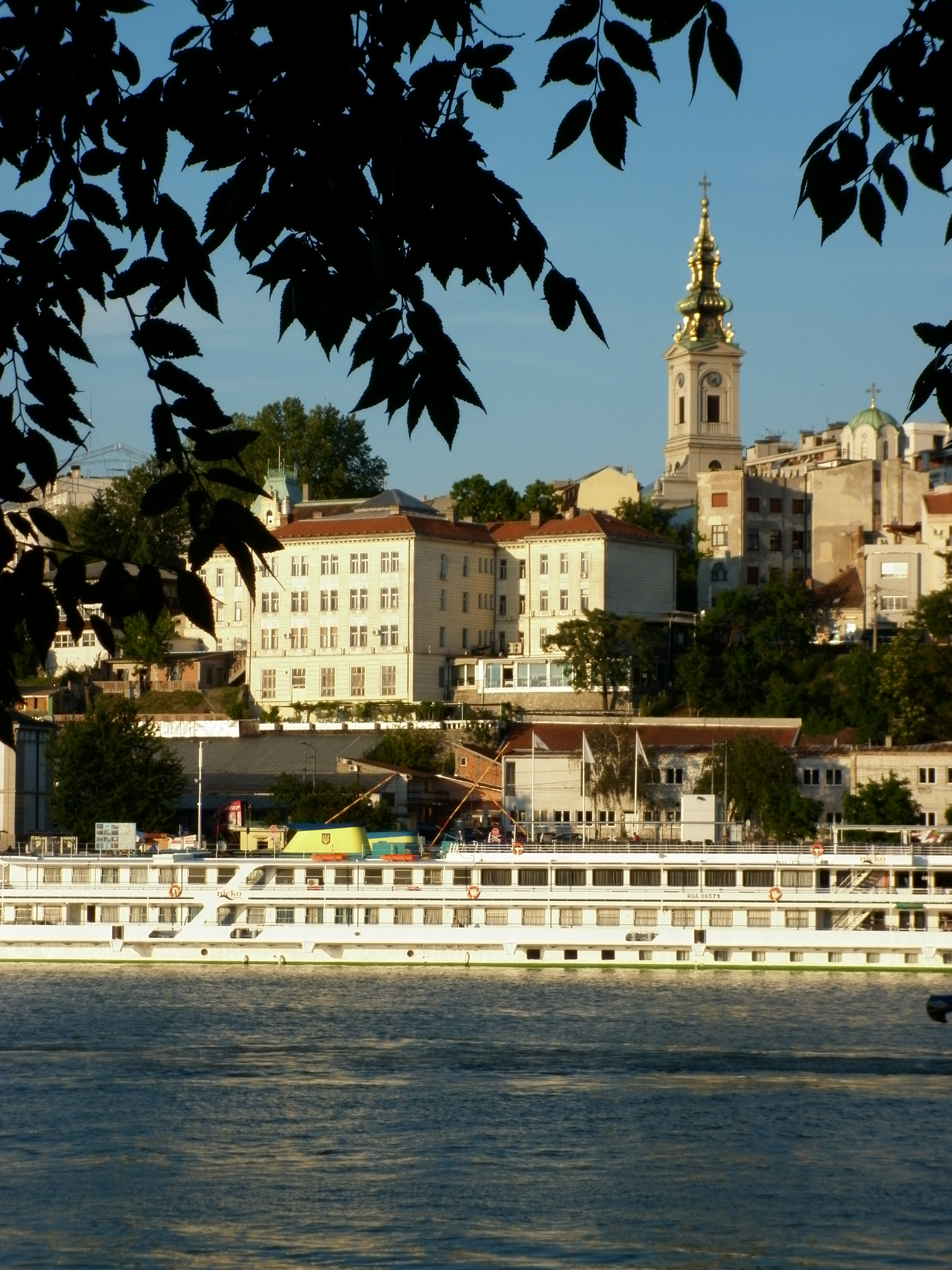
View from Sava river

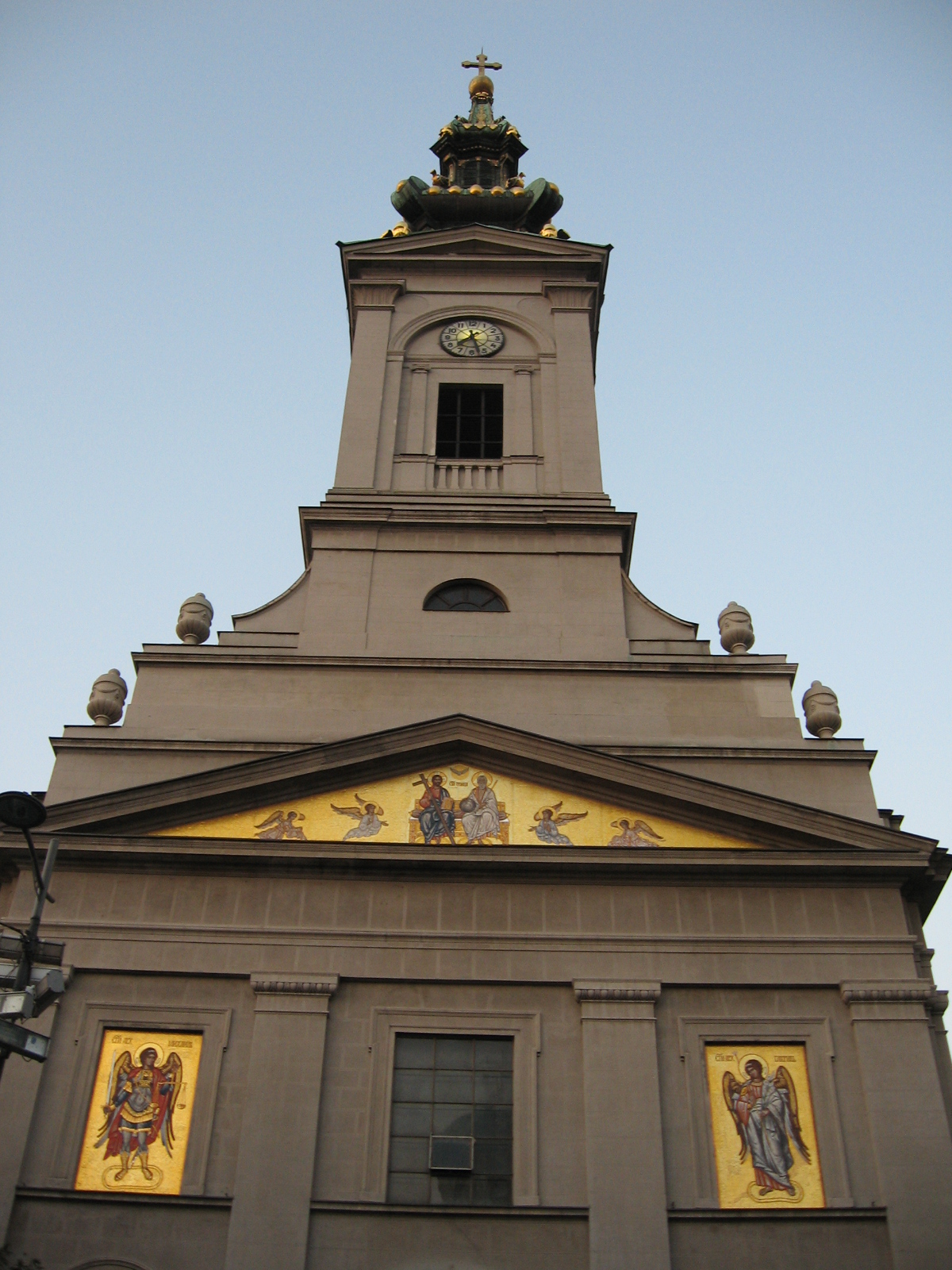
Portico

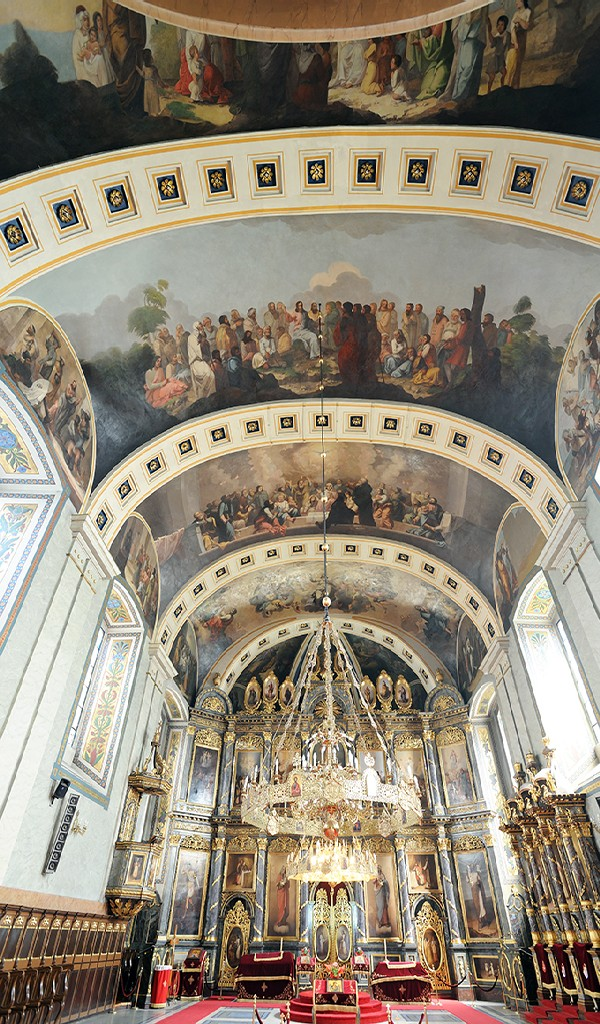
Interior

== See also ==
- List of cathedrals in Serbia
