= Obilićev Venac =

Street in Belgrade, Serbia

Coordinates: 44.8165°N 20.4558°E

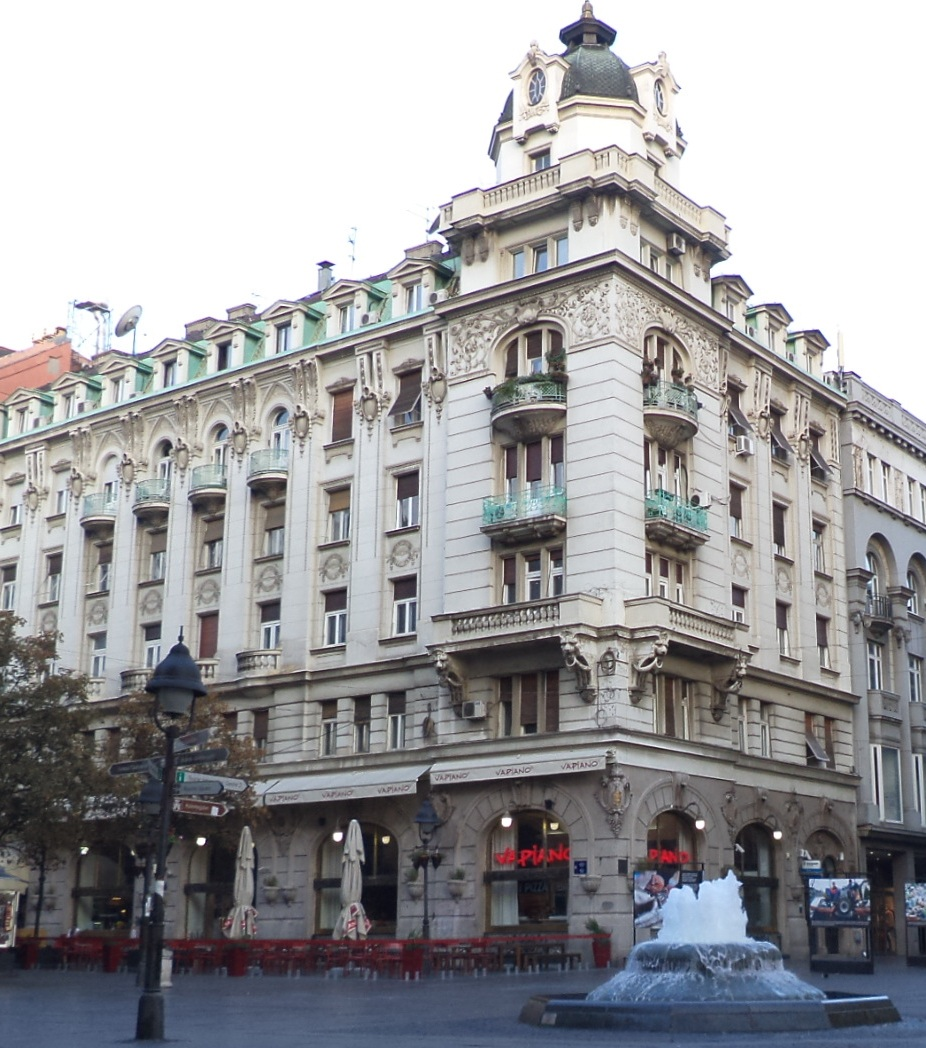
Obilićev Venac

Obilićev Venac (Serbian Cyrillic: Обилићев венац), a pedestrian and shopping zone, is located in the city center of Belgrade, Serbia, within the Knez Mihailova Street spatial unit protected by law, and contains a number of residential and office buildings dating from 1900 to 2000.

== The Obilićev Venac area – origin of the street ==
Obilićev Venac is without a doubt one of the oldest and most valuable city monument areas in Belgrade. Connected to Knez Mihailova Street, Kosančićev Venac and the Belgrade Fortress, it forms essentially the only material testimony to the continuity of the city of Belgrade, from its oldest Roman times to today.

In Ancient times the area of the street, due to the specific layout of the terrain, used the highest point as the communication route, namely the ridge that slopes gently downwards towards the Sava riverbank. Thus in later historical times the geographical location of the ridge was the main factor behind the shaping and purpose of Obilićev Venac. The street was certainly set out as far back as the Roman times, when the center of the Singidunum settlement was already located in Knez Mihailova Street. Under the onslaught of Barbarians the area of Obilićev Venac was devastated. The agony of the street's ruination continued throughout the Middle Ages and culminated in the street disappearing from the urban map of Belgrade and turning into a green field.

The street came back to life in the 15th century, during the reign of Despot Stefan Lazarević, primarily due to the reestablishment of what was once the via cardo, i.e. today's Knez Mihailova Street, through which the settlement on the Upper Town plateau was reached.

The revival of Obilićev Venac was temporarily suspended in 1456 because of the Turkish siege of Belgrade, when the area was used to erect tents for the Turkish troops, with the camp of Sultan Mehmed II located behind them, towards Vračar. Six and a half decades later, through the devastated fields at Obilićev Venac, the Turkish conquerors commanded by Suleyman the Magnificent finally conquered Belgrade on August 29, 1521.

Resettlement of the area of this street began in the summer of 1521, and flourished under Bayram Bey (1557–1568). During his reign the so-called "Upper Town" was formed, spreading on both sides of the centrally located Turkish cemetery, between today's Knez Mihailova and Braće Jugovića streets.

Generally speaking, during the Turkish occupation a residential and business "oriental style" quarter arose in this vacant area, with gardens, a meyhane, caravanserai, hospital, fountain and a mosque. Alongside the waterworks route which coincided with Knez Mihailova Street five mosques were built, and around them homonymous quarters were formed, so-called mahalas. Most important was "Ibrahim Bey's" mosque on the corner of Obilićev Venac and Knez Mihailova streets (where the former "TA-TA" later "Robne kuće Beograd" department store once stood). According to the famous geologist and sociologist between the two World Wars Chemso Derwichevitch, this mosque was built between 1572 and 1582.; it was also mentioned at the end of the 17th century by leading European geographers such as Gumpp and the "Italian plans of Belgrade.

Although it is currently unknown who Ibrahim Bey actually was, we can conclude that he was an important figure and that the building of the bimarhane or hospital next to the mosque itself, and of the large caravanserai across from it, where the Ruski car tavern stands today, can both be attributed to him. These buildings for the first time clearly defined the street contours recognizable today

== Beginnings of Europeanization of the street - the Austrian Baroque architecture in the 18th century Belgrade ==
Engraving, Belgrade "The City gf Belgrade in the XVIII century" Obilicev Venac Street and Knez Mihailova Street in Belgrade, 18th century, circa 1736, Museum of the City of Belgrade.

Numerous attempts of the Austrian Empire to save the "Eastern Christians" from the Ottoman yoke began in the 16th century and intensified from the second half of the 18th century onward. Careful analysis of the "Talijanski Plan" from 1696 reveals that after Belgrade was conquered by Maximilian Emanuel (September 6, 1688) numerous quarters, "mahalas", were torn down, and among them Obilićev Venac was particularly devastated. However, the route of the street still followed the line of Ibrahim Bey's mosque and the caravanserai across the way, where today's "Ruski Car" Tavern is located. But the experiences from this war showed the Turks after they reclaimed Belgrade that they needed to take new protective measures in the form of building a so-called "bastion", which clearly indicates the beginnings of the Belgrade "moat"(Serbian: "Шанац")

Engraving, Belgrade 'The Wurttemberg Palace and Barracks" at Obilicev Venac Street in Belgrade, 18th century, circa 1738, by Nicolas de Spaar, Vienna State's Archives.

In the summer of 1717 the Austrian army, commanded by Eugene of Savoy, took Belgrade for the second time. The already abandoned mosque of Ibrahim Bey made way for the "Bastion of St. Karl", located where the Hotel Majestic stands today. During the relatively short Austrian rule 1717–1739, through urban planning reconstruction Obilićev Venac acquired its basic and recognizable today's direction, which it retained in the structure of the street until 1867. A number of important public buildings were built in the purest Baroque architecture style during the period of the Austrian presence in Belgrade (1717–1739); among the most important buildings to be quoted were "The Charles VIth Gate" in lower part of the today's Kalemegdan Park and the "Carl Alexander of Wurttemberg Palace and Barracks" on the corner of Obilicev venac and Knez Mihailova streets (today the 'Glamour Perfumes Shop"), etc. The Alexander von Wurttemberg barracks formed the largest building in Belgrade, completely dominating not only the street's but also the city's architecture as a whole. From 1726 the barracks were transformed into the "Governor's of Serbia Palace" but were unfortunately demolished following the surrender of Belgrade in 1739 by the Austrians in accordance with the terms of the Belgrade Peace Agreement signed the same year between the latter and the Turks.

== Reconstruction of the street according to plans by Emilijan Josimović ==
The definite departure of the Turks from Belgrade in 1867 enabled the capital of the young principality to follow the lead of prominent European cities and adopt the concept of a series of connected streets in the form of "rings" which, in the Belgrade example, meticulously followed the route of the "moat". Emilijan Josimović's town reconstruction project from 1867 implemented that concept for the next fifteen years or so, giving Obilićev Venac the appearance it has today.

In 1872, at the same time as Knez Mihailova Street, this street received the name it has today, and together with Kosančićev Venac and Topličin Venac it symbolically preserves the memory of the Middle Ages and the Serbian nobility.

== Buildings in Obilićev Venac built in the second half of the 19th century and its most renowned families ==
The construction and architectural shaping of the street in the period to come was characterized by erection of mostly single-storey academic or eclectic style houses, with gardens and lower levels which, on the even side of the street, reached all the way to Maršala Birjuzova Street. The houses were mainly built by rich merchants or high-ranking civil servants, most of Serbian origin, but some from Aromanian and Jewish families as well, including the Tomanović family (Krsta M. at number 30, today number 24: the parcel was sold by his heirs, (Stanković-Grebenac), to the brothers Đorđe and Aleksandar Srbić from Savamala, (both engineers), the Simić family (Mijailo and Vasilije at 22, Obilićev Venac), Panđela-Migrić (Kosta, Olivia married to Borivoje Migrić, at number 26), the Ninčić family (Aaron and his son Momčilo Ninčić, Foreign Minister of the Kingdom of Yugoslavia, at 27 Obilićev Venac), the Mitrović family (Jovan and Velizar, at number 25), the Radojlović family (owners of the land and house in the location of their subsequently erected building which housed the department store "TATA", nationalised in 1946 by the Joseph Broz called Tito's communist regime, later renamed "NAMA" and "Beograd"). The Antonijević family at number 29 (owners of the land and building in which the old and new "Ruski Car" tavern from 1929 is located), the Notaroš family at number 15, etc.

The dynamic development of Belgrade between 1900 and 1940 completed the spatial forming of Obilićev Venac, replacing most of the houses with multi-storey buildings in the style of Secession, Art Deco and Modernism.

== Architecture of cultural and historic value from the 20th century ==
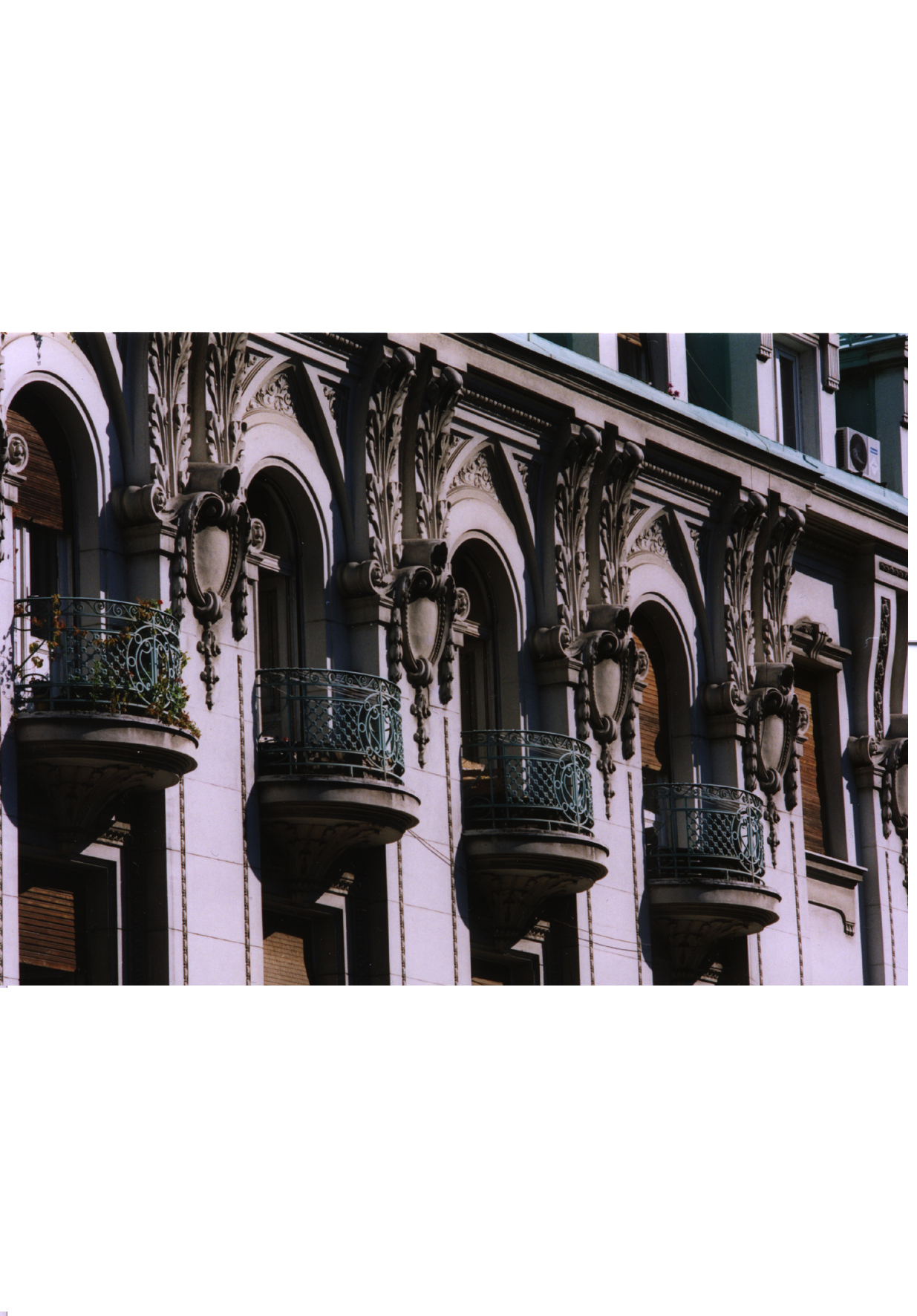
RUSKI CAR, front facade, detail

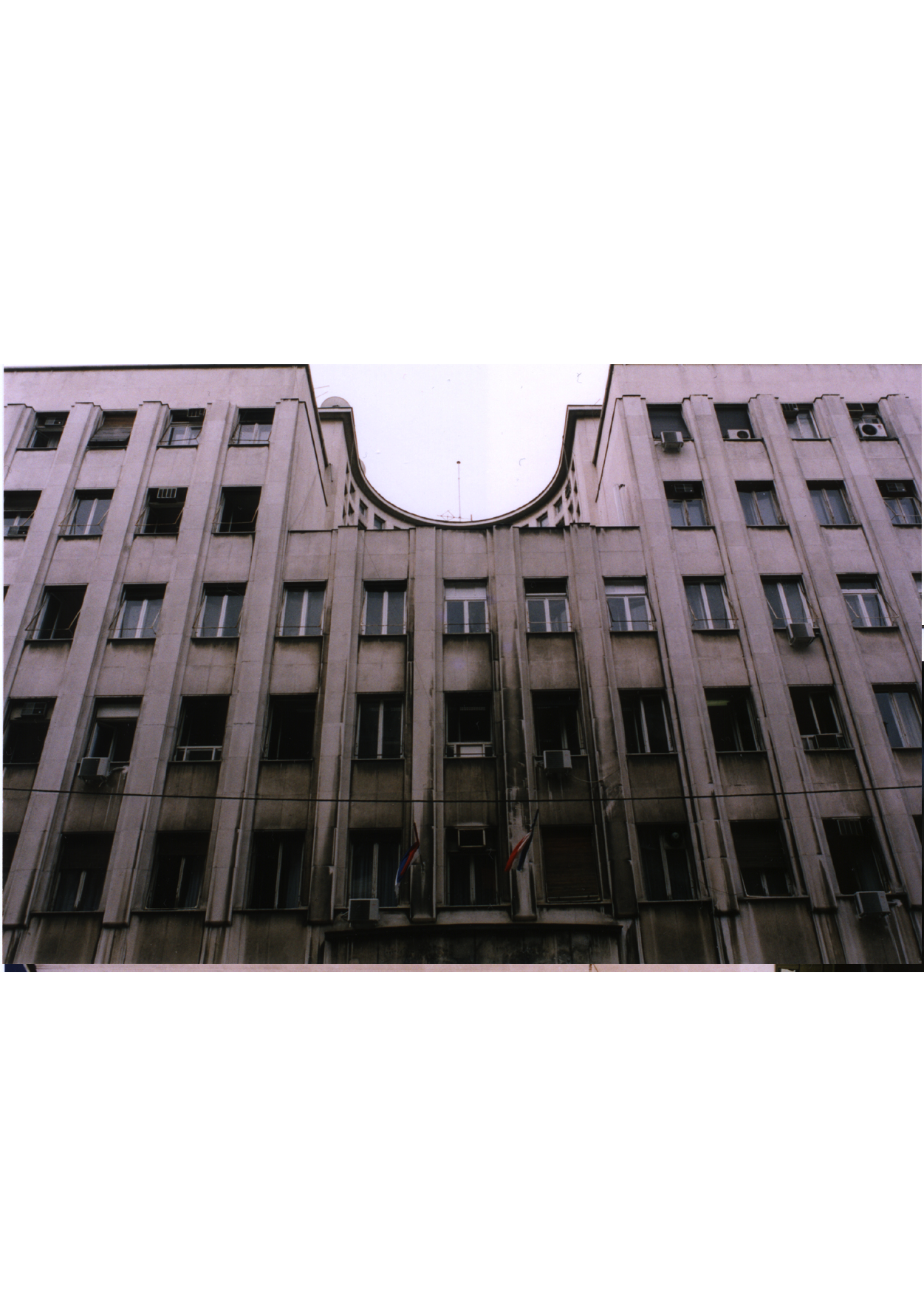
TANJUG, Belgrade, Obilicev Venac no 2, one of the best examples of the Modern Style Architecture movement in Belgrade, circa 1936

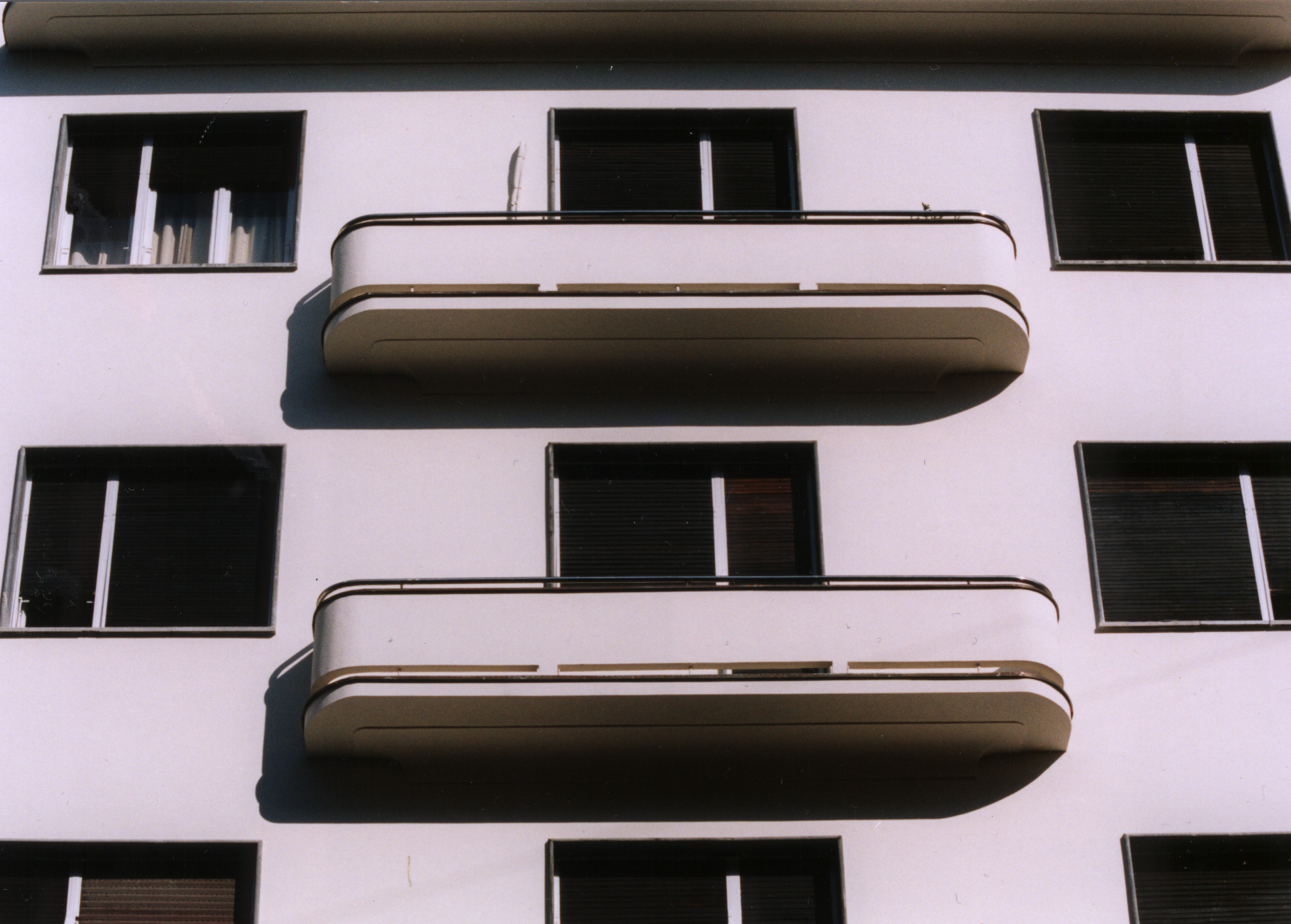
The Miša V. Simić's Building at no. 22, front facade with balconies, detail

A typical example of Secession architecture can be found in the family house of Steva Jovanović Resavac at number 16; also noteworthy are the residential and office buildings of Olivia B. Migrić, née Panđela, at number 26 and of Jovan Antonijević (the "Ruski Car" Tavern) at number 29 which show more than fair knowledge of Art Deco decorative features. Finally, the residential and office buildings of Miša V. Simić at number 22 and the Srbić brothers at number 24, built in 1939 and 1940 according to the design of architect Branislav Marinković (1904-1981) followed by the Hotel Majestic building built by its owner and architect Milan S. Minić are some of the more successful buildings in the style of Modernism in the territory of Belgrade. As a living organism, Obilićev Venac is continuously developing, but the dominant buildings erected by 1940 remain. They give this street a special brand mark, like an eternal reminder to the unquestionable Europeanization of Belgrade through centuries.

Present Tanjug office building at No. 2, before World War II known as the PRIZAD building, after the war became a headquarters of the new Communist regime's security agency OZNA, later UDBA. It served this purpose from 1944 to the 1960s. There, the secret police imprisoned, interrogated and, especially in the early years, murdered citizens, often claiming they committed suicide jumping out the windows.

== 21st century ==
From September 2016 to June 2017, the street was reconstructed and then completely closed for traffic, even though it was one of two main entrances into the large public garage. It became part of the widening pedestrian zone of the Knez Mihailova Street. In June 2020, it was announced that the monument to Milorad Mišković will be placed in the street's section in front of the Tanjug building. Mišković is considered the greatest Serbian ballet dancer. The 2.8 m (9 ft 2 in) bronze sculpture is made by Dragan Nikolić and represents Mišković performing ballet jump. It is placed on the granite pedestal, so the total height of the sculptural composition is 5 m (16 ft). Accompanying decorative fountain is also planned. In February 2022 it was announced that the monument to poet Jovan Jovanović Zmaj will be erected at the crossroad with the street bearing his name.

== Culture ==
=== Cinema Korzo ===
Dr. Vojislav Kujundžić was a son of Jovan Kujundžić, a tailor (terzija, tailor of the cloths), who founded the Dva Bela Goluba kafana, which gave its name to the surrounding neighborhood of Stari Grad. Known as the major promoter of cremation and founder of the first crematory in Belgrade, "Oganj", Kujundžić was also an ardent Freemason. In Jakšićeva Street (today Đure Jakšića), just next to the corner with the Obilićev Venac, he built a house during the Interbellum, with an intention that the cellar of the building will be used as a Freemasons' temple. His lodge, however, refused to use the premises. The cellar, built as a vast hall, was not used for a while, but was then adapted into the Cinema Korzo. In Serbian language, word korzo means a pedestrian street (after the Via del Corso in Rome, Italy), so it is even today used for the Knez Mihailova Street, which is nearby. The cinema became one of the most popular in Belgrade. It was operation until World War II. After the war, it served as a barrel storage for a while before it was ceded to the cultural-artistic society "Radiša Duda Timotijević". In the 1980s the house was demolished so today the location is occupied by the small parking lot "Jakšićeva".

=== Grafički Kolektiv ===
Gallery "Grafički kolektiv" was founded in June 1949 and was located at 27 Obilićev Venac since 1952. It had a pivotal influence on the cultural life in Belgrade an Serbia. In the early 1950s, the gallery was the only point where the graphics were exhibited so it is directly interwoven with the history and development of this type of art in Serbia. It promoted artists who would otherwise go a much harder way of developing their careers, pushed aside by the classical painting which was helped and supported as the mainstream art. The founding members were Boško Karanović (1924-2009), Mirjana Mihać (1924-2006), Dragoslav Stojanović Sip (1920-1976), and Mile Petrović.

Originally a workshop, it was adapted into the gallery. The first "May exhibition of graphics", which is still being held, was organized in 1952. In 1953 formation of the gallery's collection began. By 1955 it had 700 works of art, while by 2018 that number grew to 5,000, including some of the best examples of the modern Serbian art. Visibility of the gallery grew from 1954 when it interconnected itself with the similar venues from the abroad. ARTA, Club of the friends of the graphics was founded, but was disbanded in 1968. In the 15 years of existence, ARTA gathered a membership of 1,000, published 104 graphics from 49 artists and printed 20,000 pages of works about arts, half of which was distributed abroad. On 10 March 1964 the interior of the venue was reconstructed by architect and painter Peđa Ristić. He used mirrors and wainscot. The gallery had three exhibits per month (always starting on the 1st, 11th and 21st in the month), hired a curator and established the Veliki pečat prize in 1963, which is still being awarded. Projects, which promoted the art and artists, included Kontakt in the 1970s and 1980s, and GRIFON, a biennial exhibition of graphics since 1996.

In over 2,000 exhibitions and other cultural happenings, it included the first performance art and pop-art show by Olja Ivanjicki or first exhibition of the Mediala group. Over 1,500 artist exhibited their works, performed or held literary evenings in the gallery, including Serbian and Yugoslav artists Vladimir Veličković, Stojan Ćelić, Leonid Šejka, Sreten Stojanović, Mladen Srbinović, Milo Milunović, Dado Đurić, Veljko Petrović, Duško Radović, Brana Crnčević, Matija Bećković, Ljubivoje Ršumović, Zuko Džumhur, Radomir Stević Ras and Ljubica Sokić, but also the world-renowned artists like Victor Vasarely, Marc Chagall, Salvador Dalí, Jiří Anderle, Wisława Szymborska, Albín Brunovský, Henry Moore and Robert Motherwell. Some of the happenings were controversial. In 1962, painter Milić od Mačve organized an exhibition dedicated to the painter Sava Šumanović, who was killed by the Ustaše during World War II. After one day the police stormed the gallery, taking all the paintings from the gallery and closing it for a while. Gallery has over 5,000 works which are some of the best examples of the modern Serbian art.

In the restitution process in Serbia, during which the properties confiscated by the Yugoslav Communist government after 1945 are being returned to the pre-war rightful owners, the premises in which the gallery is located were returned to the heirs of the original owner, the Ninčić family. After the repossession of the property, the Ninčić family sold it to the ice-cream shop "Feniks" from Zlatibor. In March 2017, "Feniks" asked the gallery "Grafički Kolektiv" to move out of the premises by the end of 2018 in order to open a pastry shop in 2019 Deadline was then shortened to June 2018. The gallery was moved to the former house of a painter Nikola Graovac in the neighborhood of Kosančićev Venac, but solely for the administrative and storage purposes, as the gallery still has no exhibition space. In August 2019, new exhibition space in the Dragoslava Jovanovića Street, also in downtown, was mentioned as a possibility. In December 2019 it was confirmed that the studio will move to this location permanently.

The gallery popularized and promoted graphics, graphic design, so as other types of visual arts. It was the focal point for young artists, and one of the central spots of the critical reception of various modern arts phenomenons.

=== SANU Archive ===
In the 1980s, Serbian Academy of Arts and Sciences (SANU) initiated a project for the new building of its archive. It was to be located in the Jakšićeva Street, across the building of the academy itself, on the location of the former Cinema Korzo. The building was specifically projected for the purpose of an archive and was to have five storeys above the ground and three below. The footbridges were designed to connect it to the academy's building. Everything was prepared for the construction to start, but after the SANU Memorandum affair broke out in 1986, the project was shelved. In January 2019, historian and head of the SANU Archive, Vasilije Krestić, revitalized the idea, calling on the government to go with the project.

== Administration ==
Obilićev Venac is located in the municipality of Stari Grad. For decades it was organized as the local community (mesna zajednica) within the municipality. It had a population of 2,870 in 1981, 2,735 in 1991 and 2,089 in 2002. Municipality of Stari Grad later abolished the local communities.

== Literature ==
- Beograd na starim mapama XVIII-XXI veka, v. link : https://web.archive.org/web/20131004215613/http://www.urbel.com/documents/monografija-web1.pdf
- Đurić-Zamolo, dr Divna "Graditelji Beograda 1815-1914, Muzej Grada Beograda, 1981.
- Đurić-Zamolo, dr Divna "Beograd - kao orijentalna varoš pod Turcima", Muzej Grada Beograda, 1977.
- Đurić-Zamolo, dr Divna "Beograd 1930 na fotografijama Jeremije Stanojevića", Katalog VI, Serija zbirke i legati Muzeja grada Beograda, 1974.
- Vasić, dr Pavle "Barok u Beogradu 1718-1739", in "Oslobođenje gradova u Srbiji od Turaka 1862-1867", SAN, Beograd, 1970.
- Đorđević, Tihomir "Stanovništvo u Srbiji posle Velike seobe", in "Godišnjica Nikole Čupića", XXXVI, Beograd, 1927.
- Šabanović, Hazim "Urbani razvitak Beograda od 1521. do 1688. godine", Godišnjak grada Beograda, XVII, Beograd, 1970.
- "Letters of the Right Honourable Lady Mary Wortly Montagu: Written during her Travels in Europe, Asia and Africa, to Persons of Distinction, Men of Letters, etc., in different parts of Europe", printed for M. Cooper, London, 1763.
- Popović, Vladeta "Ledi Meri Vortli Montegju i njena knjiga pisama iz Turske", in "Godišnjica Nikole Čupića", XLV, Beograd, 1936.
- Krsmanović-Simić, Marko "Fasade Obilićevog venca kroz vreme", katalog sa izložbe starih i savremenih fotografija fasada Obilićevog venca, održane u Galeriji Grafičkog kolektiva u Beogradu, Oktobar 2003.
- Đurić-Zamolo, dr Divna "Hoteli i kafane XIX veka u Beogradu", Muzej grada Beograda, 1988.
- Gordić, dr Gordana "Arhitektonsko nasleđe grada Beograda I", katalog arhitektonskih objekata na području grada Beograda 1690-1914, ZZZSKGB, Saopštenja, sv.6, Beograd, 1966.
- Popović, dr Dušan J. "Srbija i Beograd od Požarevačkog do Beogradskog mira (1718-1739), Beograd, 1950.
- Popović, dr Marko "Područje Knez Mihailove ulice u sklopu urbanog jezgra rimskog Singidunuma", in "Knez Mihailova, zaštita nasleđa - uređenje prostora", (pod uredništvom ak. Nedeljka Gvozdenovića), Galerija SANU, 1975.
- Derwichevitch, Chemso "Evolution de Belgrade", Jouve et Cie., Paris 1939.
- "Beogradska tvrđava kroz istoriju", katalog sa izložbe održane u Galeriji SANU decembar 1969. – mart 1970.
- Gump, Johan Batista (Johann Baptista Gumpp, 1651-1728), https://daten.digitale-sammlungen.de/~db/0007/bsb00073463/images/
- "Secesija na beogradskim fasadama", izložba fotografija Miloša Jurišića, Galerija Nauke i Tehnike SANU, 2008.
- "Istorija Beograda", I, II i III Tom, (pod uredništvom ak. Vase Čubrilovića), Prosveta, Beograd, 1974.
- Trajković, Nikola "Spomenar o starom Beogradu", Sloboda, Beograd, 1984.
- Golubović, Vidoje "Mehane i kafane starog Beograda", Službeni Glasnik, 2007.
- "Adresna knjiga", Beograd, izd. "Bezbednost", 1912.
- Nestorović, Nikola "Građevine i arhitekti u Beogradu prošlog stoleća", Beograd, Udruženje jugoslovenskih inženjera i arhitekata, 1937.
- Nestorović, Bogdan "Razvoj arhitekture Beograda od kneza Miloša do prvog svetskog rata (1815-1914). - GMGB, I, 1954.
- Perović, Miloš R. "Srpska arhitektura XX veka - od istoricizma do drugog modernizma", Arhitektonski fakultet Univerziteta u Beogradu, Beograd, 2003.
