= Ruski car Tavern =

Coordinates: 44.8157°N 20.4592°E

Ruski Car Tavern
- Kafana Ruski car Кафана Русkи цар
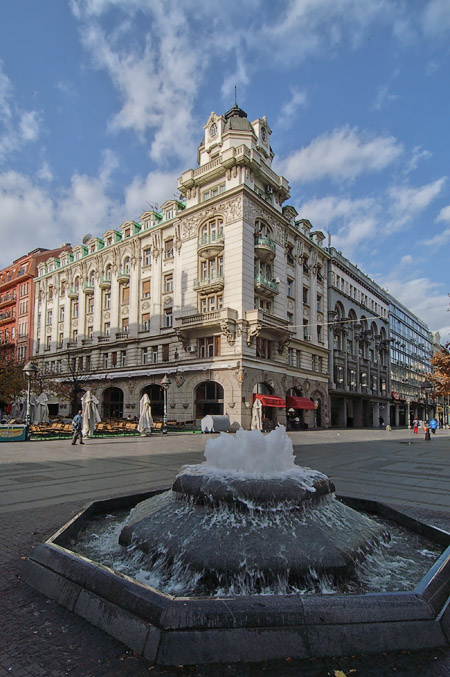
- Ruski Car Tavern
- Interactive map of the Ruski Car Tavern area

General information
- Location: Belgrade, Serbia
- Construction started: 1922
- Completed: 1926

Design and construction
- Architects: Petar Popović; Dragiša Brašovan

Ruski Car or Russian Tsar (Serbian: Руски цар) is a commercial-residential building and a restaurant in downtown Belgrade, the capital of Serbia. It is located in Knez Mihailova Street, a pedestrian zone and a commercial hub of the city. One of the most luxurious restaurants in the city at the time, it was described as a place where "people come to be seen". The building, finished in 1926, was declared a cultural monument in 1987.

== Location ==
The building is located on the corner of 7 Knez Mihailova (the official address) and 29 Obilićev Venac Streets. It is situated in the western extension of the Republic Square, across the Cultural Center of Belgrade and in the vicinity of Hotel Majestic, with the National Theater in Belgrade being right across the square.

== History ==
=== Origin ===
During the Ottoman period, they constructed an aqueduct (đeriz), to conduct water from the springs in the area of Veliki Mokri Lug. In downtown, they built three water towers: one at Terazije, another at modern Ruski Car and third where Grčka Kraljica is today. With pipes, the water was being lifted in the towers to give it additional force for further flow.

The original restaurant was opened in 1890. Almost immediately it became the gathering place for the city elite and the distinguished guests from abroad. The esteemed venue was described as a place where "people come to be seen". It was named Ruski Car ("Russian Tsar") after Alexander II of Russia, who was assassinated in 1881.

=== Interbellum ===
The present building was constructed between 1922 and 1926 after the design of the architect Petar Popović, and with the assistance of the architect Dragiša Brašovan in the development of the project. The construction works were done by Milan Sekulić and his company "Arhitekt".

The purpose of the building has not significantly changed since the erection: the residential area is on the upper floors, the business space in the mezzanine and the restaurant on the ground floor and in the basement. The name of the old, ground floor venue of "Ruski Car", which was demolished to make room for the new building, was kept. During the Interbellum, it was an elegant Belgrade restaurant, the meeting place for both noble citizens and the intellectual elite of that time. The meetings of Serbian engineers and architects were held in the Ruski Car both before and after the World War I. Distinguished regular guests in this period included Veljko Petrović, Branislav Nušić and Mihajlo Petrov.

=== After 1945 ===
The new Communist authorities after the World War II confiscated the building and nationalized it in 1960. That year, the first Belgrade's "express restaurant", a self-serving buffet restaurant with cooked meals, was open in the building. The name of the tavern was changed to "Zagreb", the original luxurious interior was demolished and the expensive cutlery was replaced with the plastic plates.

The city owned company "Stari Grad" managed the restaurant. In the 1990s it leased it to the Serbian-Australian Jack Samardžija, who restored the venue to resemble the pre-1960 look and renamed it back to Ruski Car.

=== 21st century ===
In 1998 the leaseholder became Snežana Bulić, wife of a criminal Jusuf Bulić, who was killed that same year. "Stari Grad" was privatized by the "Midlend" company, but "Ruski Car" was excluded from the agreement and was separately sold by "Stari Grad" directly to Snežana Bulić in 2002 and the ownership later shifted to her son, Dragan Aca Bulić. Zoran Antonijević, whose father and other relatives constructed the building and were the owners since 1934, applied for the edifice to be returned to him when the process of the restitution of the confiscated properties began in Serbia. After the venue was sold, he filed a suit against "Stari Grad" and its successor. State Directory for properties issued a statement saying that the restitution law didn't exist at the time and that the property could be sold.

In May 2012, Bulić leased the restaurant to the German Vapiano restaurant chain for 10 years. Vapiano reshuffled the venue, reopened it in June and changed its name. The public protested, asking that city, if nothing else, marks the façade with the name "Ruski Car", regardless of how the name of the restaurant may be changed, but city didn't do it. In August 2013, the court ruled, within the process for the tax evasion by Bulić, that the property was acquired by the criminal activities and ordered for the restaurant to be taken away from Bulić and placed under the administration of the Directory for the seized property. From that point, Vapiano stopped paying the rent and in April 2014 the Directory temporarily closed the restaurant. After reaching an agreement with Vapiano, the venue was reopened after a month and a half. In December 2014, after Bulić's appeal, the court returned the restaurant to him, until the final judgment is ruled. During these processes, some business data surfaced into the public. It turned out that Vapiano was paying €40,000 per month, which is stupendously high for Belgrade. Vapiano claimed that the rate would become gradually lower, after reaching a total of €750,000. Due to the all data presented, including other unlikely sums like Vapiano's claim that in April–May 2014 they lost €200,000 due to the temporary closing or that they invested €1,2 million in adaptation of the restaurant, reporters discussed the possibility that the entire business is a money laundering scheme. In August 2014 Antonijević died, but his descendants continued the restitution process.

Vapiano left the premises in January 2016 and by this time the state quit prosecuting Bulić for tax evasion, so he remained the owner. The Antonijević family is still legally fighting for the building. There are several other examples in the Knez Mihailova and Obilićev Venac streets where nationalized property was sold in the late 1990s by the, so called, "Šešelj law", but the courts later annulled the contracts and returned the properties to the pre-war owners. In October 2016 news appeared claiming that the first Belgrade's Hard Rock Café will be open in the building of Ruski Car.

In July 2019, new investor "Pensulo" reached an agreement with the tenants to reconstruct the restaurant area, promising they will preserve the appearance of the building, which should be obligatory by the law anyway as the building is protected. But the investor began to change the appearance of the building, both the exterior and the interior. First, they removed the original exterior frieze made of wrought iron and demolished part of the wall on the Knez Mihailova side, to open a new door. A platform for the ventilation, 20 m^{2} (220 sq ft) large and weighing one ton, was placed on the 90 years old roof, which immediately began to leak. The tenants revoked their permission also claiming that the investor has no necessary permits from the protection institutes. The investor claims he has all the permits, including the one from the Ministry of Construction, but refused to produce any proof, while the ministry refused to respond whether they issued the permit or not.

In December 2019, the renovated venue was re-opened under its old name, "Ruski Car".

== Architecture ==
As a whole, the building has characteristics of academic mannerism and represents a typical large building erected in the city center in order to be rented. The decorations bear elements of neo-baroque in the design of the corner dome, whereas the corpus of the building is much closer to the academic variant of Art Nouveau, specifically the secession.

== Protection ==
The tavern is situated within the Knez Mihailova Spatial Cultural-Historical Unit of Exceptional Importance, which was declared in 1979, by "The Official Gazette of the Socialist Republic of Serbia", No. 14/79.

The building itself was declared a cultural monument by the city's decision, announced in the "Official Gazette of the City of Belgrade", No. 16/87, from 10 July 1987.

== See also ==
- List of cultural monuments in Belgrade
