= Bobova =

- Village (Selo)
- Location within Serbia
- Coordinates: 44°16′N 19°42′E
- Country: Serbia
- District: Kolubara District
- Municipality: Valjevo

Population (2002)
  - Total: 391
- Time zone: UTC+1 (CET)
  - Summer (DST): UTC+2 (CEST)

Bobova is a village in the municipality of Valjevo, Serbia. According to the 2002 census, the village has a population of 391 people.

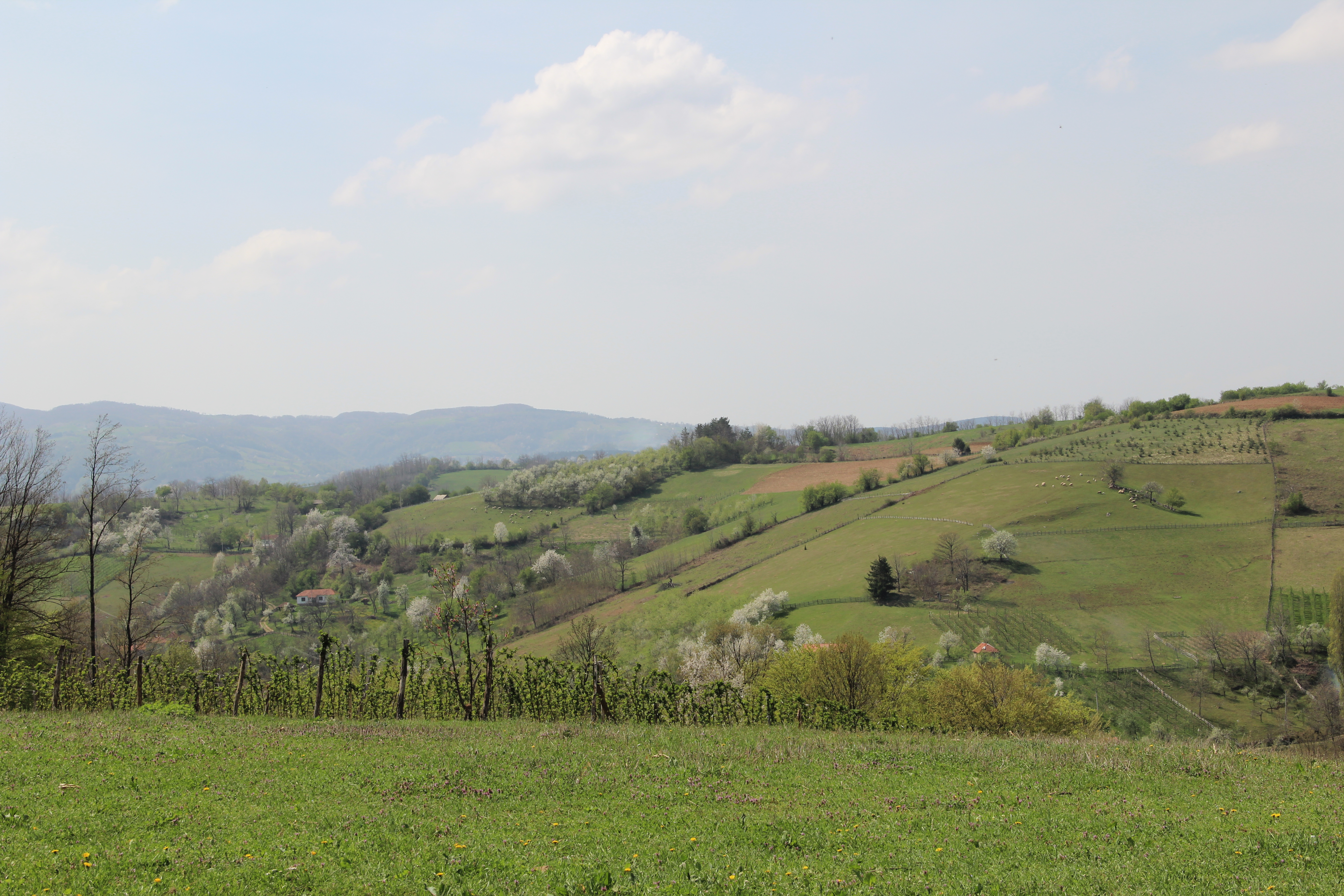
Bobova – panorama

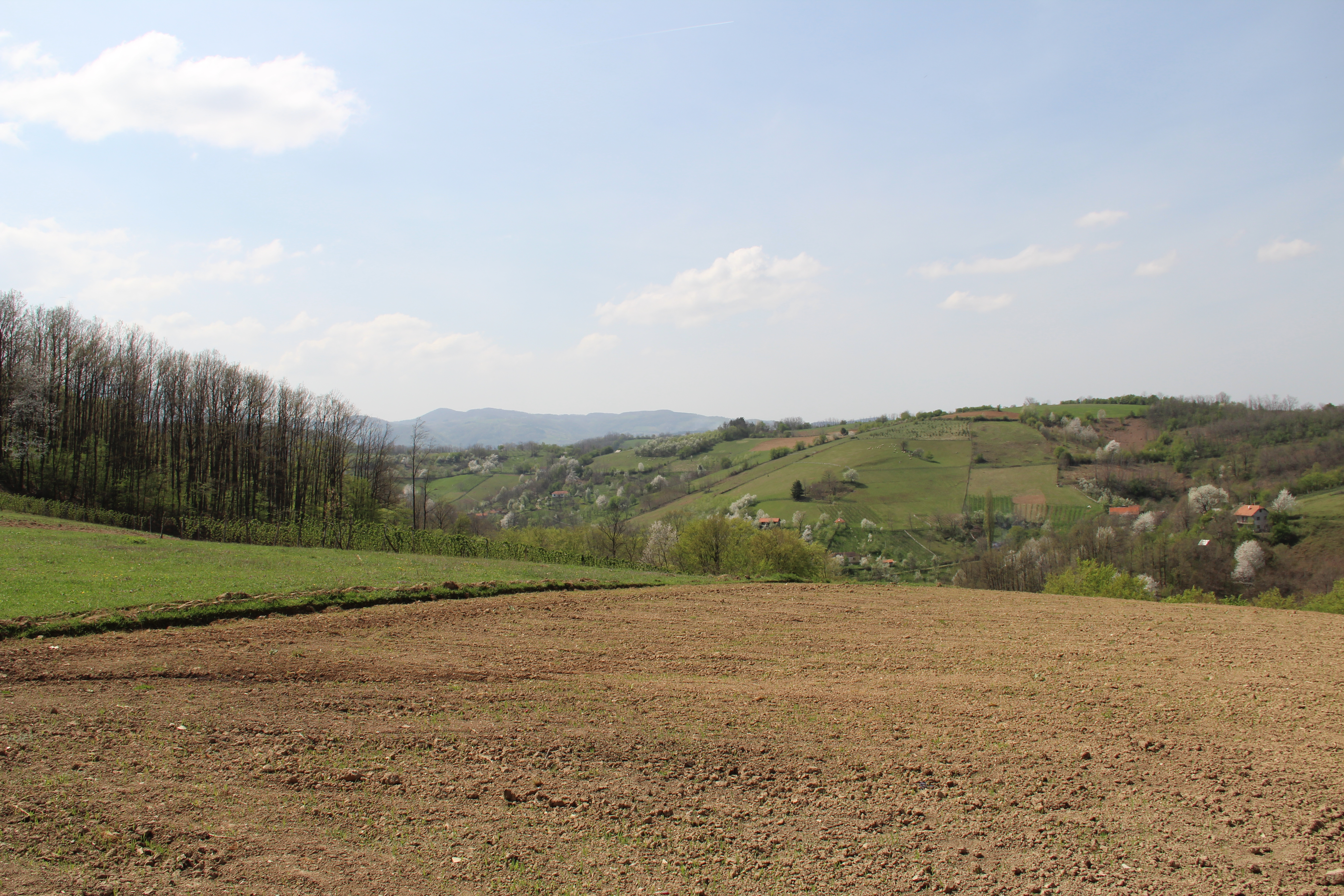
Bobova – panorama

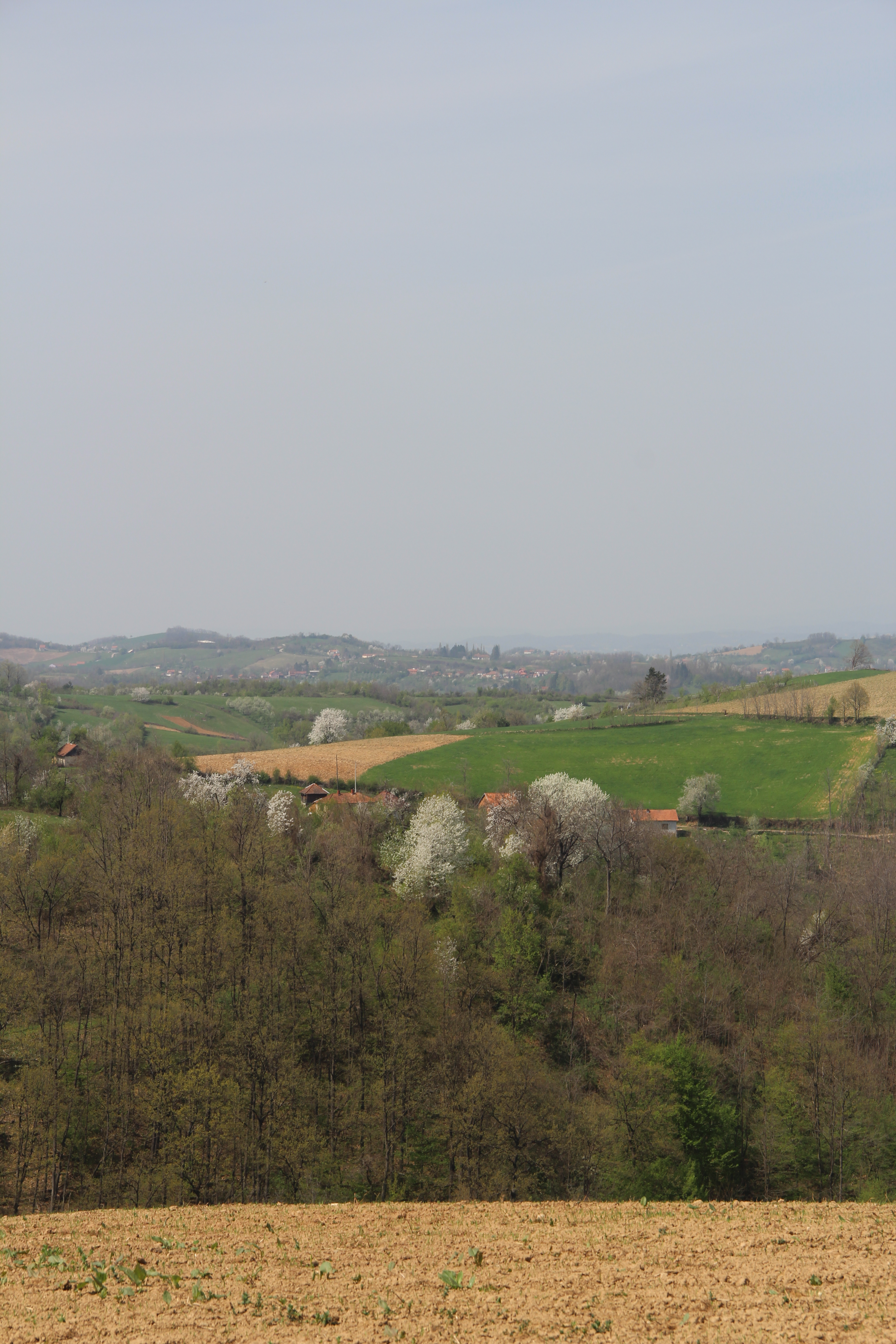
Bobova – panorama

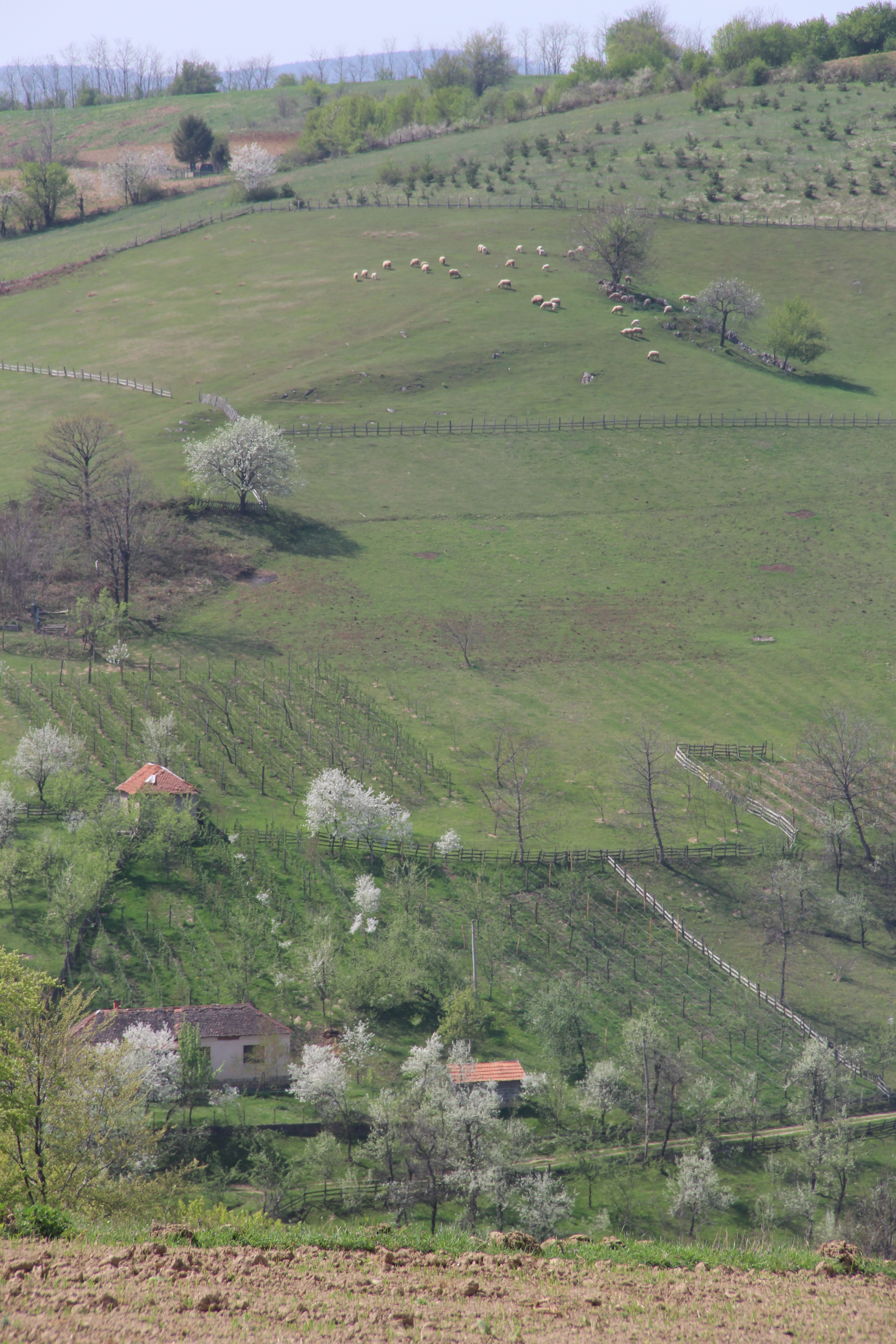
Bobova – panorama

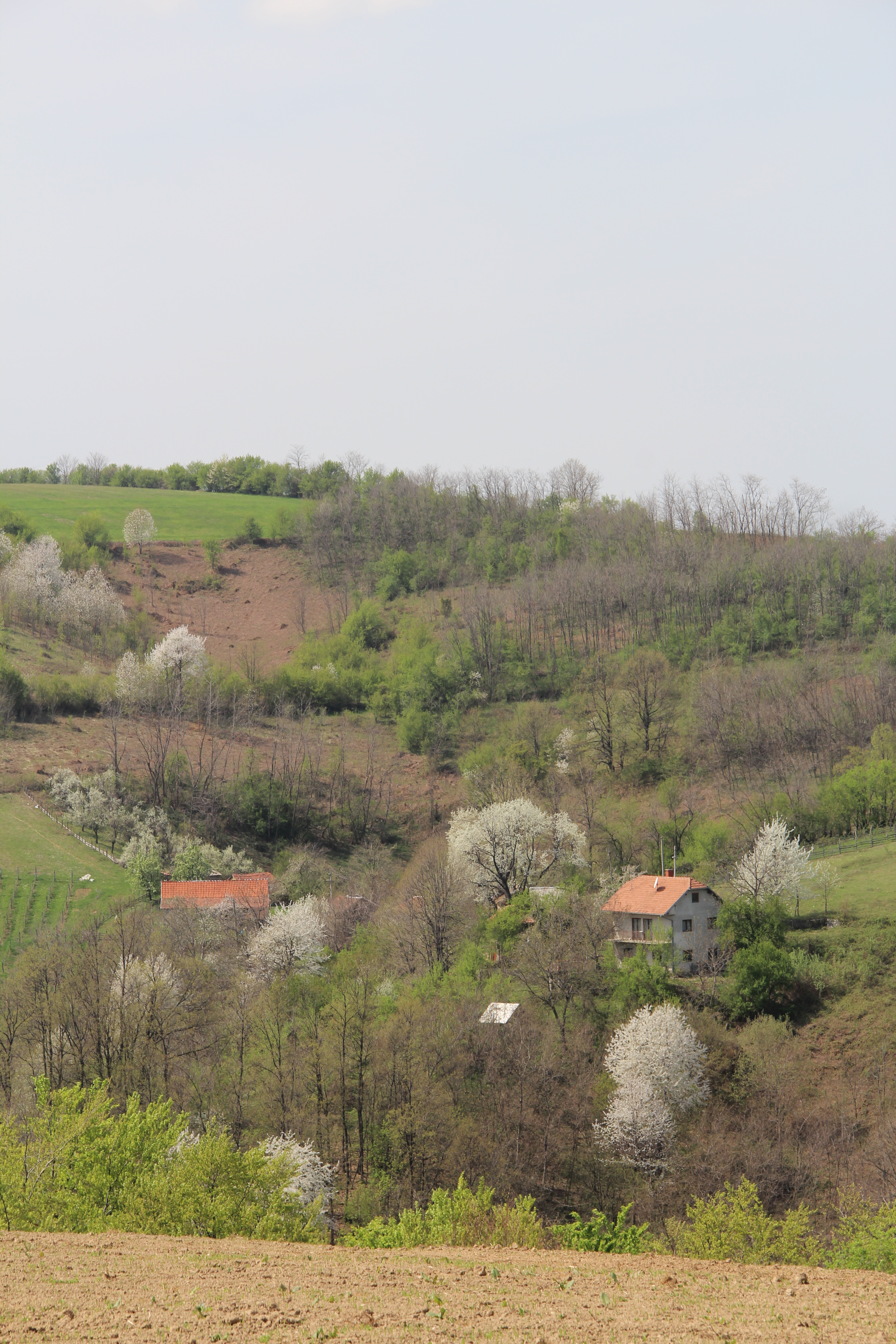
Bobova – panorama

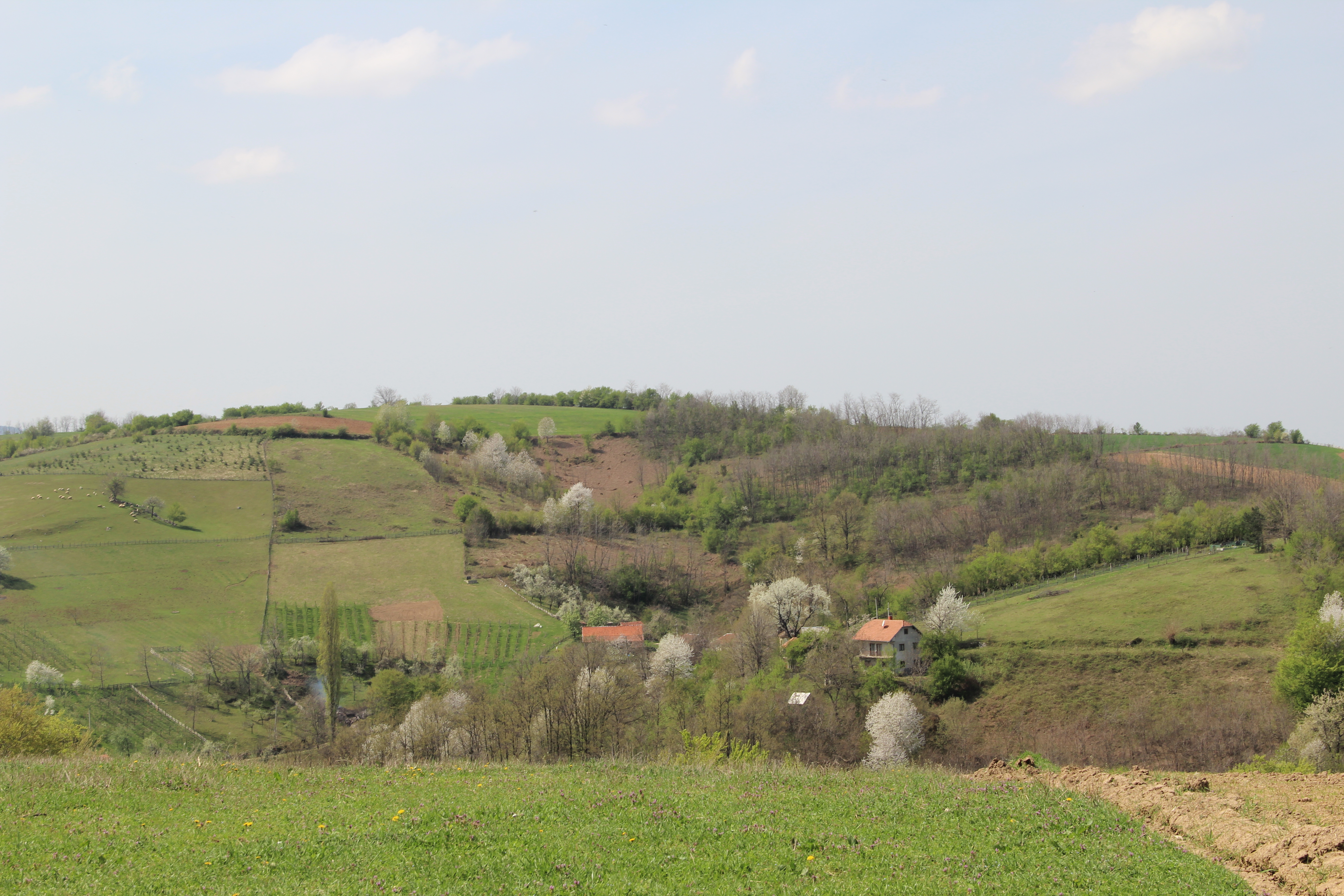
Bobova – panorama

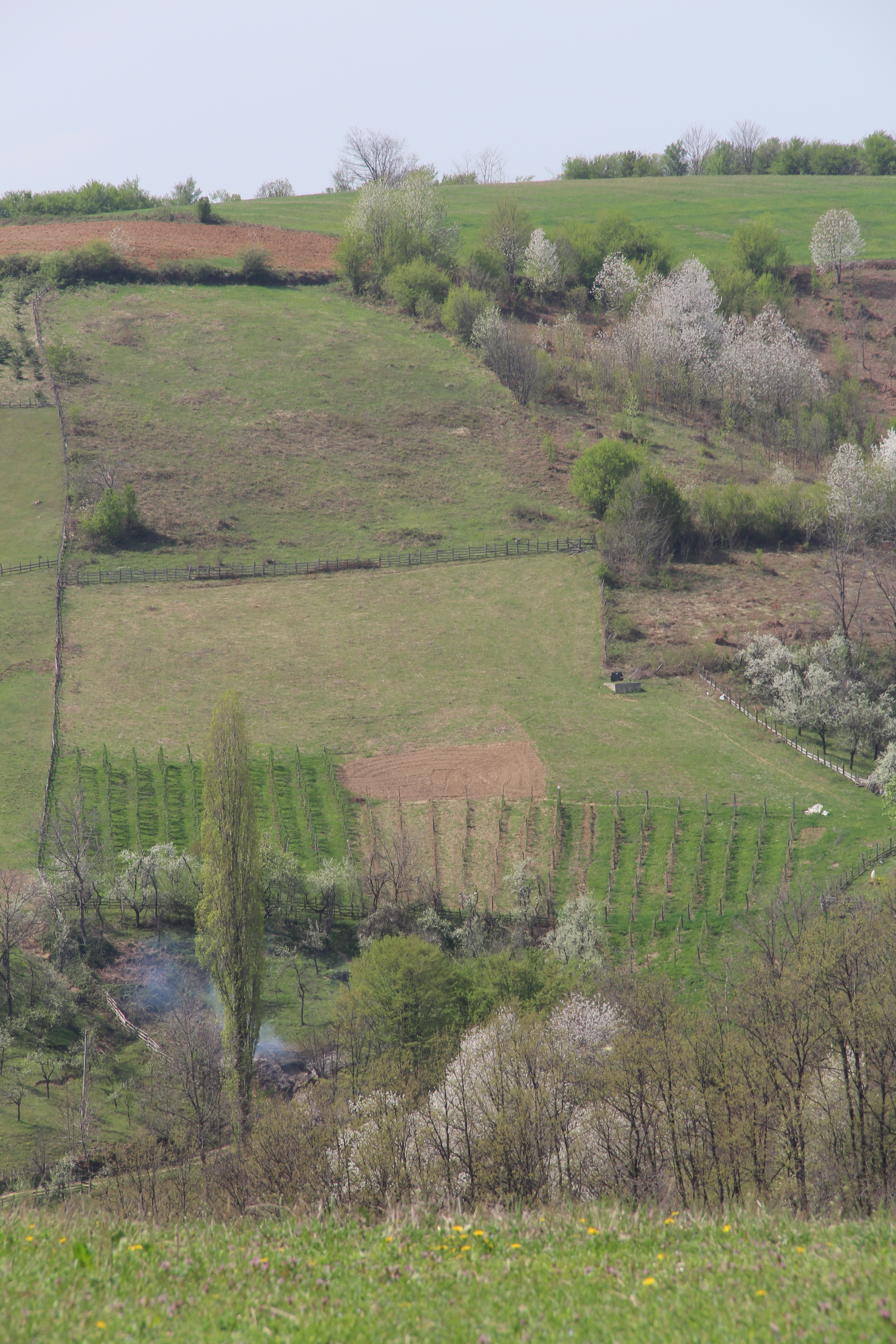
Bobova – panorama

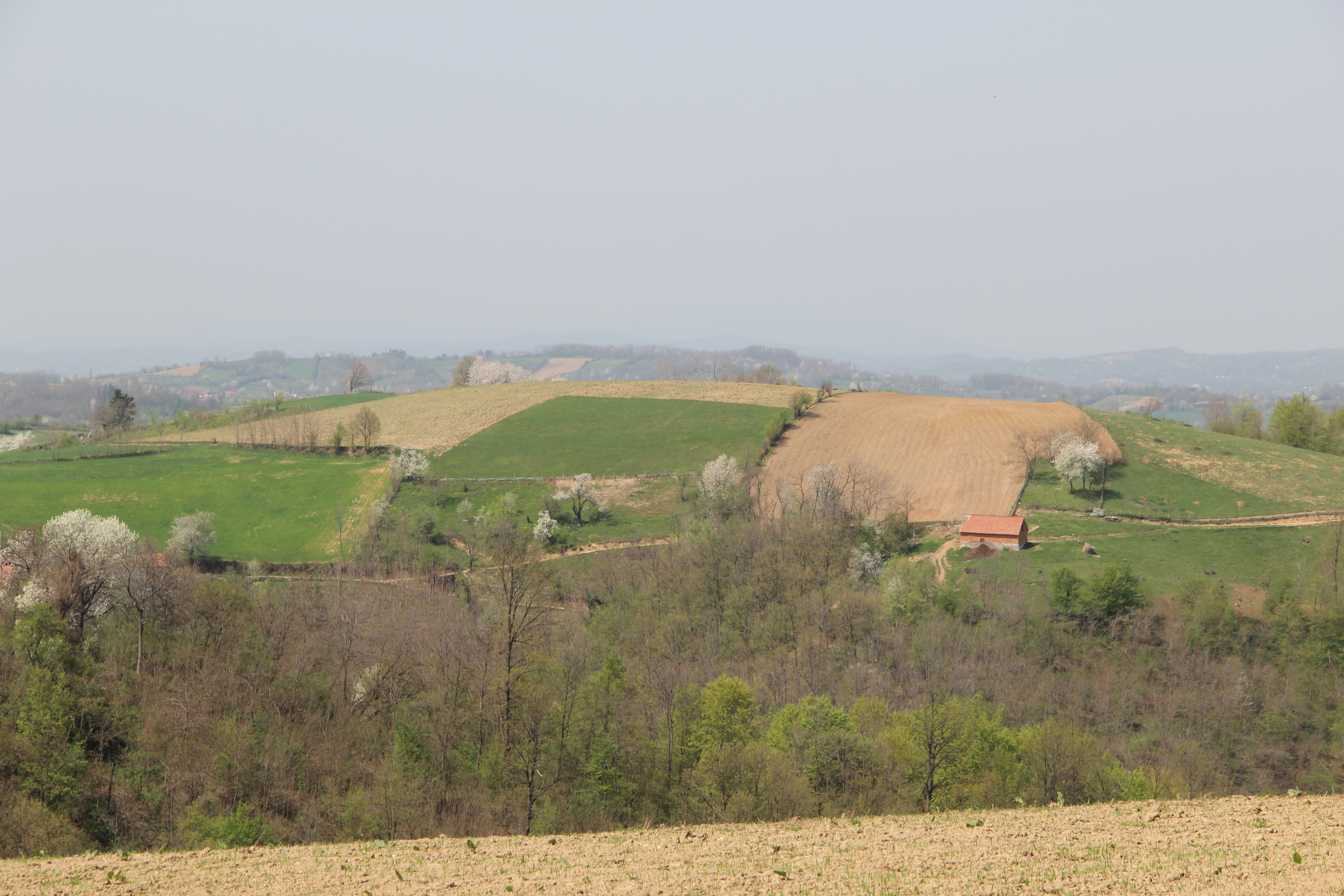
Bobova – panorama

== History ==
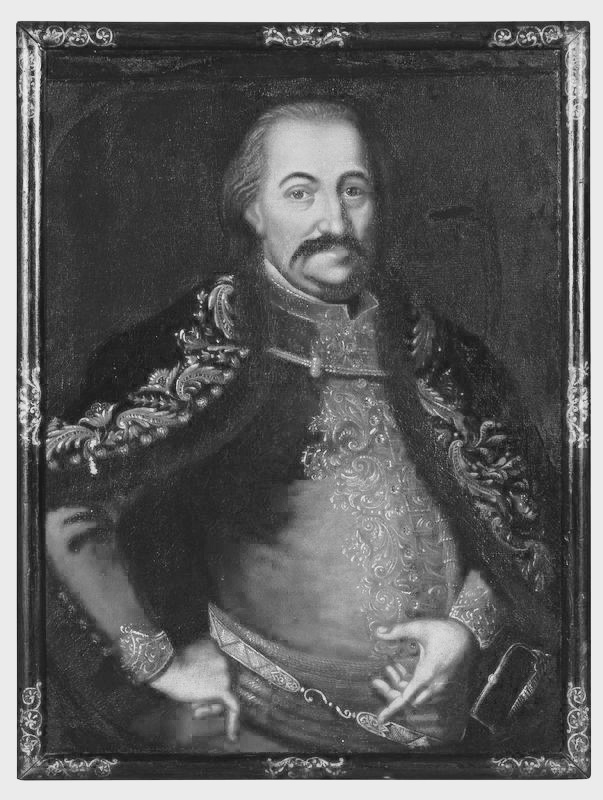
Јovan Simic of Bobova

The prince Jovan Simić Bobovac was born in Bobova on 17. August 1775 (died on 26 July 1832). He was a Serbian Knyaz (prince), firstly appointed president of the Serbian Supreme Court, politician and participant of the First (1804) and Second Serbian Uprising (1815) against the Turks in the occupied Serbia. One of the closest collaborators of the souvereign prince of Serbia – Miloš Obrenović.
