= Grčka Kraljica =

Former kafana in Belgrade, Serbia

Coordinates: 44.819463°N 20.453910°E

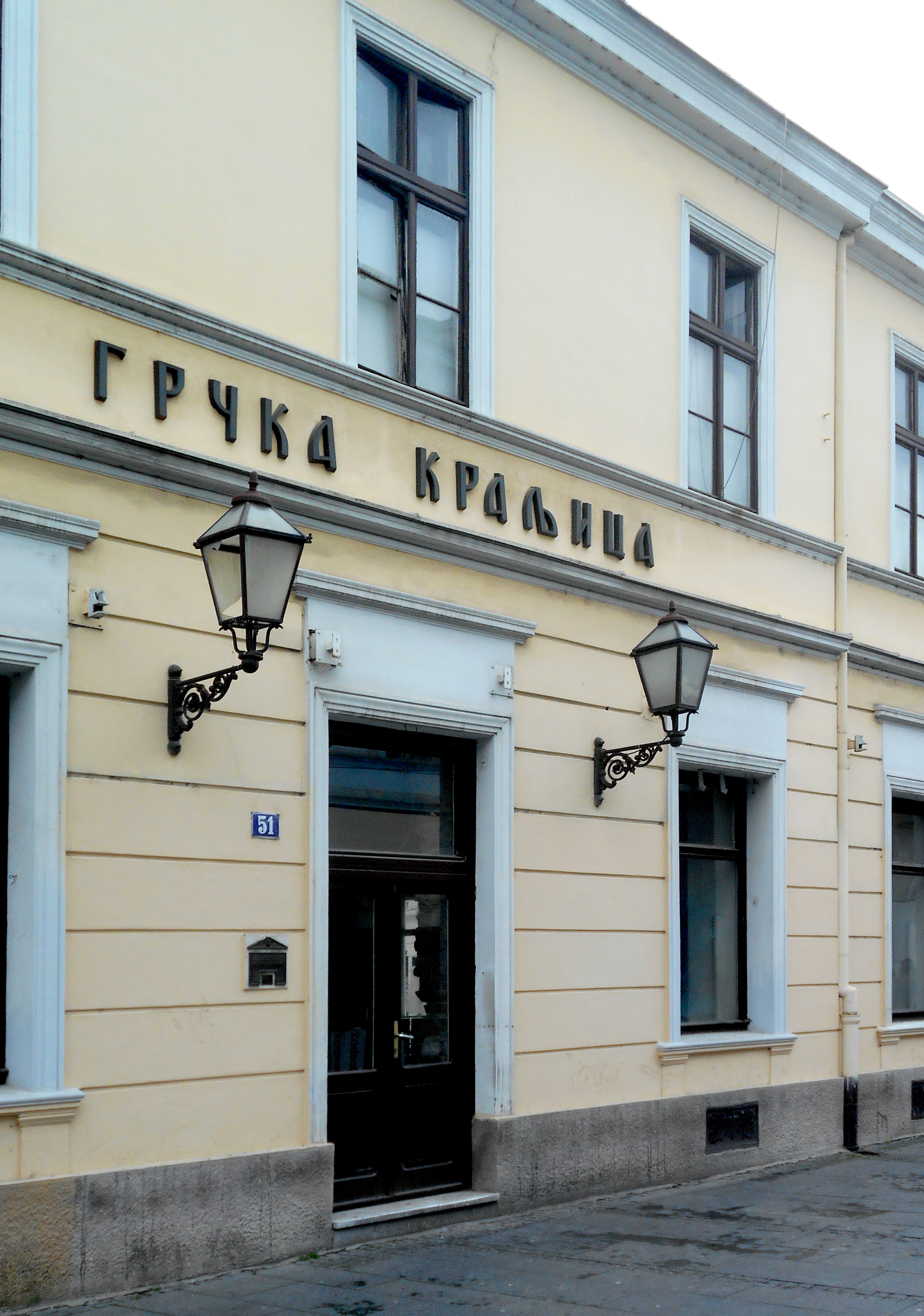
Grčka Kraljica in 2018, with the renovated façade

Grčka Kraljica or Greek Queen (Serbian: Грчка краљица) is a former kafana in Belgrade, Serbia. Built in 1835, the building is located on Knez Mihailova Street, the commercial hub of downtown Belgrade. For decades, it was one of the favorite kafanas in the city, but it was closed in 2007.

== Location ==
Grčka Kraljica is located at 51 Knez Mihailova street, near the end of the street and close to Kalemegdan Park, in the municipality of Stari Grad. It is situated on the corner of Knez Mihailova and Rajićeva streets. West of the building, across the Rajićeva, is the Faculty of Fine Arts, part of University of Arts in Belgrade. To the north and northwest, across the Knez Mihailova, are the City Library and the Rajićeva Shopping Mall.

== History ==
=== Origin ===
The lot on which the building was constructed was location of one of the three water towers which made city waterworks during the Ottoman period. The Ottomans constructed an aqueduct (đeriz), to conduct water from the springs in the area of Veliki Mokri Lug. In downtown, they built three water towers: one at Terazije, another at Ruski Car and third where Grčka Kraljica is today. With pipes, the water was being lifted in the towers to give it additional force for further flow.

Hajim Davičo, a personal supplier to the ruling prince Miloš Obrenović, opened one of the first, and the most popular, bureau de change on this location. Davičo was held in high esteem and, operating since 1816, his exchange office was considered to having the most trustworthy exchange rate. His business was so important in the just liberated state without its own currency, that his bureau practically functioned as a national bank.

The land was purchased by Despot Stefanović who built the one floor edifice in 1835. The author of the project is not known and the venue became a kafana (meyhane) immediately, named Despotov Han ("Despots khan") after its owner and didn't change its purpose in the next 172 years, until it was closed. The building has a cellar and a backyard, while the floor was adapted into the rooms for rent. Originally, there were 8 rooms, later 11 and then 14, when the upper floor with 8 rooms was added in the c1850. After a while, the upper floor was adapted into the residential space.

At the beginning, Despotov Han also operated as the first recorded brothel in Belgrade. This was the reason why Stefanović built additional floor with "day rooms" in the 1840s. However, the prostitution was not only morally questionable but also illegal, so when it became the widely known public fact, the venue quit the practice. The sex workers moved into the streets, while the khan survived the infamy and continued as regular kafana.

=== 19th century ===
The venue is considered an important point in the development of the city's catering industry but also for history in general. On 15 June [O.S. 3 June] 1862 an incident happened at the Čukur Fountain in the Dobračina street, southeast of "Despot's khan". At that time, the Turks still administered the Belgrade Fortress, just west of the khan, as Serbia still wasn't de jure independent. Turkish soldiers, nizams, came to the fountain and a quarrel ensued between the Turks and a young Serbian merchant apprentice, Sava Petković, who was then killed by the nizams. Serbian gendarmes arrived quickly and arrested the Turks. However, other nizams arrived and a verbal dispute began. An interpreter with the Belgrade police, Sima Nešić, tried to mediate between the Turkish soldiers and the Serbian gendarmes, but the Turks started shooting, killing Nešić. The commander of the Serbian guard, Ivko Prokić, tried to remove the Turks from the scene but more shots were fired and the incident escalated into a city-wide conflict which lasted the entire night, with Prokić also being killed by the Turks. The news about the incident spread around Belgrade, and Serbian armed rioters quickly overtook the Varoš Gate and destroyed the Sava and Stambol gates. On the following day, a truce was worked out by the foreign consuls in the city, especially John Augustus Longworth, British Consul-General. Under the terms of the truce, the Pasha in charge of the fortress agreed to remove his police from the town and the Serbian prime minister, Ilija Garašanin, in turn, guaranteed their safety during the move. A day later, the pasha summoned the consuls to the fortress and while they were still underway, 56 fortress cannons began to shell Belgrade. About 50 civilians and soldiers died, about 20 houses were burnt down, and another 357 damaged. Shelling lasted from 9 a.m. to 4 p.m. That was the day when funerals for Nešić and Prokić were held. An official, ceremonial procession was passing through the main city streets when the shelling began. Serbian Prince Mihajlo Obrenović utilized the incident and in April 1867, the Turks completely withdrew from Serbia. During the fighting in June 1862, Serbs formed their stand behind the still unfinished Captain Miša's Mansion, and in front of "Despot's khan".

As the khan was always full, there were stories around the town that Stefanović is also hosting prostitutes. Though this apparently wasn't the case, Stefanović decided to sell the venue as the rumors began to affect his business. He sold the building to the banker Jovan Kumanudi, a member of the Kumanudi family. Jovan adapted it into the hotel and changed the name to "Hotel Grčka Kraljica", as the Kumanudi family was of Greek origin. When Turkish pasha handed over the keys to the city to Prince Mihajlo on 18 April 1867, it was also close to the venue. It was the beginning of the period when the kafanas in Belgrade, from Oriental-style inns, transformed into the European-type restaurants, in appearance, service and menus.

After Jovan died in 1866, his children became the owners, first his son Andrija, also a banker, and later his daughter Mileva. Leaseholders included Janko Lazarević (c. 1860), Aleksa Dimitrijević (c. 1896) and Dragutin Daničić (c. 1922). After 1945, when the new Communist authorities came to power, they confiscated and nationalized the venue.

=== 20th century ===
The building achieved a rare feat for the edifices in Belgrade: it wasn't damaged or destroyed during all the major troubles. The riots during the May Coup in 1903 (when king and queen, Alexander Obrenović and Draga Mašin were killed), World War I, World War II (both the massive and destructive German bombing of Belgrade in 1941 and Allied Easter bombing in 1944), Communist revolution 1944/45. Though upgraded and renovated on several occasions, thanks to not being destroyed, the building for the most part preserved its authentic exterior.

After the Communist government took over, the name was changed to Plavi Jadran ("Blue Adriatic") in the 1950s and the disco was later opened in the cellar. Originally named Zvezda ("Star") and later renamed to "Metro", it was a very popular city venue. The ground floor and the cellar were renovated and expanded in 1990, and the restaurant was ceremonially opened by mayor of Belgrade, Aleksandar Bakočević, under the old name, "Grčka Kraljica".

Though always full, especially as a favorite inn of the merchants and travelers, the venue wasn't considered much of a distinguished one during the 19th century. After the World War II it became very popular and was particularly known as one of the favorite meeting places for the "morning coffee". It was described as a "beautiful and beloved restaurant of older Belgraders" and a place visited for a drink or a lunch after a walk in Kalemegdan Park. Especially popular was the pastry shop in the right wing of the building. The state owned catering company "Tri grozda" became a leaseholder in 1969 and the ownership was transferred to the municipally owned "Poslovni prostor Stari Grad". "Tri grozda" closed "Grčka Kraljica" in 2007 for the impending renovation. The State construction inspection in 2008 concluded that "Tri grozda" doesn't have all the necessary permits because the building, though not protected by the law itself, is part of the Knez Mihailova Spatial Cultural-Historical Unit of Exceptional Importance. "Tri grozda" stopped the reconstruction, and not only failed to obtain the permits, but went bankrupt in 2012.

=== Recent ===
"Poslovni prostor Stari Grad" held no biddings for the new leaseholder in the next years, and, left as it was, the building deteriorated. The windows got broken and the façade was vandalized with the graffiti. On 1 December 2016 City of Belgrade took over the ownership from the "Poslovni prostor Stari Grad" and leased the venue. In May 2017, 10 years after it was closed, the construction works on the reconstruction continued. The woodworks, windows and doors, were replaced and the windows were glazed with the new glass. The interior was cleared of the rubble. However, it is not known who is the new leaseholder and what will be the purpose of the reconstructed building. Despite journalists' questions, city officials didn't disclose the information, while on the location, no one wished to speak to the reporters. Unofficial reports claim that the venue will not be in the catering business anymore.

In November 2017 it was announced that the leaseholder is "Reina Amalia" company, since November 2014. "Stari Grad" didn't send invoices to the leaseholder for the first 2 years as, per agreement, "Reina Amalia" was to renovated the building with its own funds instead. When city took over, they began charging the lease, but the leaseholder reported problems with obtaining the permits from the city and quarrels with the neighbors, so they halted works. As they didn't pay any lease, city hanged a reminder notification on the venue's door, but didn't declare the contract void.

Despite being on an exquisite location, as of 2020 "Grčka Kraljica" remains closed.

== Disco club Zvezda ==
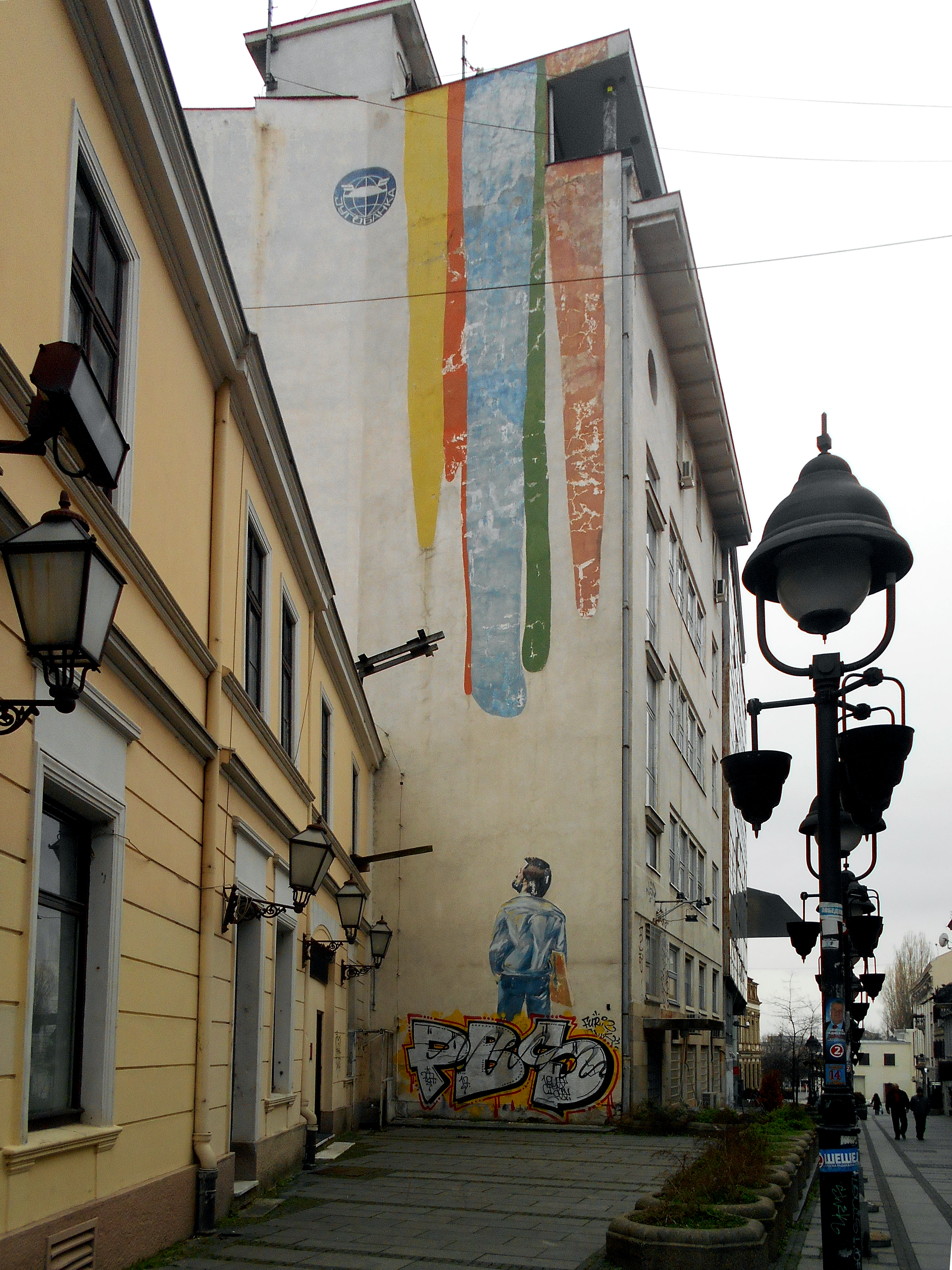
Mural in Rajićeva before the 2018 renovation. Grčka Kraljica is the indented building on the left, with the side entrance into the former disco club Zvezda

At the end of 1981, the Akademija club, which would become one of the most famous in Belgrade, was opened in the basement of the Gallery of the Painting Academy at 53 Knez Mihailova Street, right across the Grčka Kraljica. It was a meeting place of the rockers, artists, politicians' children, young and avant-garde rebels, etc. Akademija is described today as a "separate state" during the 1980s, which forged a new culture of having fun.

In the basement of the Grčka Kraljica, which was accessed from the side entrance, a rivaling disco club Zvezda was opened in 1983. Including the location, it was opposed to Akademija in every sense: diametrically opposite interiors, music and general concept. Zvezda soon became the symbol of the fanciness (šminkeraj). To obtain a membership card for Zvezda, people needed political and other connections, but modern and attractive look, which included imported perfumes and wardrobe, was the best pass. Rivaling clubs were so different, that just by the attire of the people approaching, it was obvious which club they will they enter. It was inconceivable at the time that one person would visit both venues.

Zvezda and Akademija became the main gathering points of the Belgrade youth of the 1980s. They are described as meeting point of two Belgrades - one, which smelled on beer, tobacco and marijuana, and the other one with fragrances of the Western perfumes and Italian leather shoes. After Zvezda was closed, another club, called Bassement was opened instead in the 2000s, but that club was later closed, too. Akademija remained an important part in the growing up and maturing of generations to come, and survived until 2011, when it was finally closed,

== Mural in Rajićeva ==
The venue is located at the corner of the Knez Mihailova and Rajićeva streets, and the building in 19 Rajićeva Street which leans on Grčka Kraljica, towers it, being much higher. As it is also wider than the building in which the restaurant is located, there was a large section of façade, without windows, facing the venue and the Knez Mihailova. In 1984 a group of art students, under the guidance of a painter and their professor Čedomir Vasić, painted a mural. It depicts an art student from behind, holding a sketchbook under his arm. He is gazing above, at the waterfall of colors which flow from the top of the building. The original sketch was drafted by Perica Donkov, while the student was modeled after Mirko Ognjanović, who also worked on the piece.

In 1982, the center for the planning of the urban development of Belgrade, at the "Communications" conference, considered the idea of fixing the façades by painting murals. In 1983, the Arts Academy offered drafted artworks for 50 façades to the city hall. It was part of academy's initiative of "artistic intervention", instigated by the students solutions for the walls and buildings which have no architectural merits for preservation, but which still can change the panoramic view of the city, and to fill the "urban emptiness".

The Rajićeva location, which was a Beobanka branch at the time, was approved the first by city officials, though at the same time another mural was painted on the "20th October" cinema, by the French Cultural Center. The mural was done within the Youth Day celebrations, held on 25 May each year. Vasić even spent one night in police detention, until the CEO of Beobanka wasn't assured by the city that the painting of the mural was legally approved.

Though in Belgrade few murals were done earlier, like in 1970 in the Bulevar Revolucije or in 1979 on the Western City Gate (both by Lazar Vujaklija), as the first in this period, the mural in Rajićeva fueled the muralism movement, labeled the "fixing of the city" by the artists which wished to offer passersby a different feel from the empty and naked walls. Vasić stated that this way art prevents urban space from being faceless. Though over 50 murals were painted in Belgrade since then by numerous artists (from 1984 to 1997 Vasić and his students painted several other murals), the mural in Rajićeva has been labeled as "legendary".

In time, both the elements and the graffiti damaged it. It was renovated in 2003 but deteriorated again. It was fully reconstructed in September 2018.
