= Petar Popović (architect) =

Serbian architect

- Born: May 25, 1873; Prilep, Ottoman Empire
- Died: February 4, 1945 (aged 71); Belgrade, Yugoslavia
- Occupation: Architect

Petar J. Popović (25 May 1873 – 4 February 1945) was a prominent Serbian architect. In addition to notable architectural achievements, Petar Popović made a great contribution to Serbian heraldry and vexillology. He was also a painter.

== Early life and schooling ==
Popović was born into an old and distinguishable family of priests in the town of Prilep, at the time in Ottoman Empire. His family left Prilep when he was a child and came to the north in Smederevo, where Petar received his primary education. He continued schooling in Belgrade wherein 7th grade he switched from classical to technical high school which he finished with excellent grades. Popović proceeded to study architecture at the Technical Faculty of Velika škola (1892-1896). This is where he got interested in monuments of Serbian medieval art, which he considered of utmost importance for Serbian architecture.

== Career ==
In 1897 Popović started working in the Ministry of Construction, where he stayed for the next three decades. In 1901 he passed state exams for an architect and subsequently began his designs. In 1919 Popović became head of the Ministry of Construction and Public Works as well as a professor of Medieval Serbian and Byzantine architecture at his alma mater, Belgrade University.

He became a member of the Serbian Royal Academy (today Serbian Academy of Sciences and Arts) in 1925 while the next year he became a corresponding member of Jan Masaryk Academy of Labour in Prague. He was also highly decorated.

Except for architecture, Popović was also engaged in church interior decoration, restoration of buildings, urbanism, historiography, heraldry and vexillology.

Although he retired from state service in 1927, Popović remained active in research, publishing as well as in building.

== Style and Works ==
Although some of his projects (mostly private buildings as well as some public ones) were executed in an academic manner, Popović preferred the Morava style of Serbian medieval architecture for most of his works. He promoted the creative reconstruction of Serbian medieval building styles as opposed to new, modernist architecture. Some of his achievements in this style are regarded as the best of their kind (Vranje County building, Kostolac Church, Church of St. Alexander Nevsky in Belgrade).

His works include:

- Belimarković Chapel, Vrnjačka Banja (1903)
- reconstruction of Lazarica Church, Kruševac (1904)
- County building, Zaječar (1907)
- County building, Vranje (1908)
- Petrograd Hotel, Belgrade (1912)
- Ruski Car building, Belgrade (1922–25)
- Memorial church with ossuary, Štip (1926)
- Church in Kostolac (1926)
- Dimitrijević House, Belgrade (1928)
- Samodreža Church, Kosovo Polje (1928, with Aleksandar Deroko)
- Church of St. Alexander Nevsky, Belgrade (1930, with Vasiliy Androsov)
- Ministry of Education building, Belgrade (1933)
- Vavedenje Monastery, Belgrade (1936)

== See also ==
- List of Serbian architects
- Vladimir M. Popović (1876-1947)
