= Vasilije Simić =

Serbian Lawyer Judge and attorney

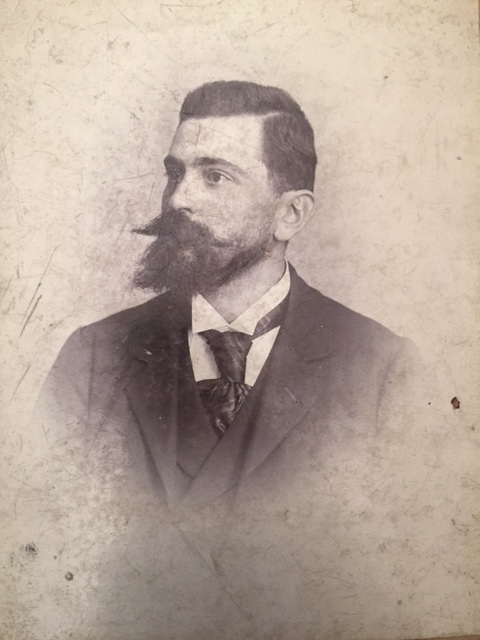
Vasilije M. Simic, circa 1899, author Atelier of Milan Jovanovic, Belgrade

Vasilije Vasa Simić (22 July 1866 – 4 September 1931) was a Serbian lawyer, judge and attorney. He studied law in Paris and Geneva. He was president of the Belgrade Town Court and royal prosecutor in the summary court in the proceedings following the "Ivandan assassination attempt" on King Milan in 1899. After the fall of the Obrenović dynasty in 1903, he was retired early from the position of judge of the Appellate Court in Belgrade and started his career as an attorney at law. During both of the Balkan Wars in 1912 and 1913 and World War I, 1914–1918, he was a reserve captain in the Supreme Command of the Serbian army and retreated with the army across Albania to the island of Corfu in 1916. He took part in the Battle of Kaymakchalan and the breach of the Salonika front. He was an expert at the Paris Peace Conference in 1919. He died in Belgrade at the age of 65.

== Biography ==
Vasilije Simić was born on 22 July 1866, in Belgrade. His father, Mijailo S. Simić (1837–1901) was a prominent member of the General Auditor's Court of the Principality of Serbia who took part in various departments in the administration of the Town of Belgrade and was president ("Mayor") of several Belgrade municipalities (the Varoš, Terazije and Palilula boroughs. Simić's mother Mileva (née Stojković) (1843–1910), was an Aromanian from Šabac, originally from Kruševo, Macedonia. From 1860 on the Simić family became one of the most prominent families in the Principality of Serbia and later in the Kingdom of Serbia. Their family house was located at Obilićev Venac number 28 (today number 22). In 1878, Vasa enrolled in the First Belgrade Grammar School, located in the left wing of the Captain Miša's Mansion. In 1885 he finished the First Male Grammar School in Belgrade. After a stay in Brussels (1885) and London, from 1886 to 1890 he studied law and completed his legal studies in Paris and Geneva on a state scholarship from the Kingdom of Serbia. He then continued his studies in 1891 at the School of Political Sciences in Paris. He returned to Serbia in 1892 and was appointed to his first civil service position, as a judge at the first instance Town Court in Belgrade in 1897, then President of the first instance court in Šabac in 1898, and then president of the first instance Town Court in Belgrade. On 4 November 1900, Simić was appointed judge of the Appellate Court in Belgrade, and soon thereafter appointed deputy president of the same court. In 1898 he married Draga, daughter of Krsta M. Tomanović, hardware wholesaler and owner of the most expensive plot of land ever sold in the history of Belgrade (1936), where the "Kafana Albanija" once stood, and where today stands the homonymous Trading Fund Building (Serbian: Palata Trgovačkog fonda). A neoconservative by political orientation, Vasa, like his father, was an active member of the Progressive Party. Through the Simić family (Jovan Simić Bobovac) he was very close to the Obrenović dynasty, particularly to the King Milan Obrenović and the political circle surrounding Milutin Garašanin (1843–1898).

== Simić's role in the proceedings following the "Ivandan assassination attempt" on King Milan ==
In 1898 Vasilije M. Simić, as a judge at the first instance Town Court in Belgrade, adjudicated in a case against Nikola Pašić in a lawsuit brought by the Belgrade police on the grounds of offence against the dignity of a reigning sovereign (fr.: "Lèse-majesté") committed by Pašić against King Milan in an article printed in the "Odjek" magazine that year. Despite great respect for the Obrenović dynasty in general, and especially as a personal friend of King Milan, Simić pronounced Nikola Pasić not guilty.

Immediately thereafter, in 1899, V.M. Simić was appointed investigative judge and royal prosecutor in the Ivandan assassination attempt affair, in the Magistrate's Court in the proceedings against would-be assassinator Knežević and his aiders/abettors. The indictment he submitted to the Summary Court was sixty pages long. His contemporaries, firstly his colleague Živojin M. Perić (1868–1953) and his school friend, Slobodan Jovanović (1869–1958) believed that the wording of the indictment was in accordance with the material truth, and also with Simić's assessment of the roles of certain persons qualified in the indictment as indisputable accessories of would-be assassin Knežević. These qualifications made by Simić were not based on his subjective feelings towards the political situation at the time, "and even less towards Serbian radicalism" but on facts systematized in proper hierarchal order and concisely set forth in the indictment document.

== End of a career as a judge due to the fall of the Obrenović dynasty ==
Simić did not escape the fate of those that took part in "exceptional courts": he did not remain with the Appellate Court or in civil service for much longer after the political overturn on 29 May 1903.

In December 1903 Simić was removed from all duties and definitely retired as judge of the Appellate Court, at the age of only 38. As a judge, although unrelenting, V. Simić was still lenient and reasonable; according to his contemporaries and colleagues (Živojin Perić and Slobodan Jovanović), he had compassion for the accused, regardless of their social standing or political orientation.

From December 1903 onwards, for the rest of his lifetime, Simić worked as an attorney in his law firm at Obilićev venac, and towards the end of his life he joined into a legal partnership with his nephew Svetolik Grebenac at the same address. He remains known for his engagement in the sale of the property of Queen Natalija Obrenović (1859–1941) for whom he acted as legal representative for property and legal matters in Serbia and France for over 20 years.

In his marriage with Draga, Simić had two children, daughter Danica (1901–1902) and son Miša V. Simić (1903–1976), who was a professor of constitutional law.

== As reserve captain in the Supreme Command 1912–1918 ==
As a reserve infantry officer Simić fought in both the Balkan Wars and in the Great War. During the First and Second Balkan War Simić was a reserve captain with the Supreme Command of the Serbian army. After the victory of the Serbian army in the Battle of Kumanovo he transferred to Skopje with the Supreme Command. In 1914 World War I broke out and Vasilije Simić was once again sent to serve with the Supreme Command of the Serbian army. From the autumn of 1915 the Serbian army and refugees were in a dire situation in Kosovo and Metohia. The Supreme Command decided on a retreat across Albania and Montenegro to the Adriatic coast to meet up with the Allied forces. After the Albanian Golgotha Vasilije M. Simić ended up on the island of Corfu, which housed the Serbian army, refugees, the national parliament, government and other institutions. With the Serbian army he breached the Salonika front and took part in the Battle of Kaymakchalan. He participated in the liberation of Belgrade, Zagreb and Ljubljana.

== End of life and descendants ==
How much Simić endured in the hardships of war can be summarised from his death on 4 September 1931, in the family home at 22 Obilićev venac street. Until his death he was a tireless associate of humanitarian, philanthropic and patriotic institutions, and was decorated for it with the Order of the Cross of Takovo, the Order of Saint Sava (grade 4) and the so-called Albanian Commemorative Medal of the Great Serbian Retreat. The French Republic decorated him with the order: Officier de l'Instruction Publique.

He was buried in the Simić family tomb in Belgrade New Cemetery, (plot 11, tomb 37). His direct descendants live in France, Belgium and Belgrade (families Krsmanović-Simić and Gillès de Pélichy).
