= Knez Mihailova Street =

Street in Belgrade, Serbia

- Knez Mihailova Street

- Location within Belgrade
- Native name: Улица кнез Михаилова (Serbian); Улица кнеза Михаила (Serbian)
- Namesake: Mihailo Obrenović
- Length: 1,000 m (3,300 ft)
- Location: Stari Grad, Belgrade

Cultural Heritage of Serbia
- Type: Spatial Cultural-Historical Unit of Exceptional Importance
- Designated: 1964
- Reference no.: ПКИЦ 1

Knez Mihailova Street (Serbian: Кнез Михаилова улица, romanized: Knez Mihailova ulica, officially: Улица кнеза Михаила, Ulica kneza Mihaila) is the main pedestrian and shopping zone in Belgrade, and is protected by law as one of the oldest and most valuable landmarks of the city. Named after Mihailo Obrenović III, Prince of Serbia, it features a number of buildings and mansions built during the late 1870s.

One kilometer long Knez Mihailova Street was protected in 1964 as the spatial cultural-historical unit, the first cultural monument of that type in Belgrade. In 1979 it was elevated to the Spatial Cultural-Historical Units of Great Importance, and as such is protected by the Republic of Serbia.

== History ==
=== Roman period ===
The street follows the central grid layout of the Roman city of Singidunum, as one of the main access roads to the city corresponds to the modern street today. The main axis of urban development was along the street, which was the main route of communication (via cardo).

The original earthen and wooden fort stretched around the Studentski Trg and Knez Mihailova Street. The oldest Roman graves were discovered in this section, dated to the 1st and early 2nd century. Thermae were located in the Čika Ljubina Street. Also in the Čika Ljubina, remains of the house from the 4th century was discovered in 2008, which included the part of the floor and doorstep of the main entry door. Parts of the walls were decorated with frescoes. An aqueduct was used to conduct water from the modern Kumodraž area. At some point it was joining the aqueduct from the Mokri Lug and then continued further to the castrum. Both Mokri Lug and Kumodraž are hills, so the natural inclination allowed for the water to flow downhill to Singidunum. Aqueducts passed through the modern center of Belgrade, Terazije, and along the Knez Mihailova.

When digging for the future Rajićeva shopping mall began in 2004, remains of the antique and late antique layers were discovered, so as the remains of the southwest rampart route and double trench in the direction of Kralja Petra Street. The trench from the 3rd century was buried and full of coins, lamps, ceramics and jars. Next to this locality, at the corner of Knez Mihailova and Kralja Petra, an area paved with the cobblestone dating from the 2nd century was discovered. It was a public space, located right before the entrance into the fortress. During almost every construction in Knez Mihailova and the neighboring streets where digging is involved, remains are being discovered. In 2008 in Čika Ljubina Street remains of the house from the 4th century was discovered, which included the part of the floor and doorstep of the main entry door. Part of the walls was decorated with frescoes. Similar findings are discovered in Kosančićev Venac and Tadeuša Košćuškog. Remnants of the Roman castrum from the 2nd century were discovered beneath Tadeuša Košćuškog during the reconstruction in June 2009. They were conserved and reburied. In Cincar Jankova Street, five graves from the late 1st century were discovered so as the three canals. Archaeologists expected to find a southeastern route of the castrum ramparts, but due to the mass wasting in the area and the leveling of the terrain, the route was destroyed in time.

=== Ottoman and Austrian occupations ===
During Ottoman occupation, in the first half of the 16th century, the Ottomans repaired the old Roman aqueduct and built a new one along the street with drinking fountains, as the neighborhoods could not develop without the water. They also built gardens and five mosques with adjoining mahalas. When Austrians occupied Belgrade in 1717 they demolished the old houses and mosques and built new buildings.

=== 19th century ===
Reigning prince of Serbia Alexander Karađorđević, built a drinking fountain (česma), which became known as the Delijska fountain, after the name of the street at the time. It was demolished and built three times in the 19th century. The fourth reincarnation of the fountain, which stands today, was built in 1987 within the scopes of a major reconstruction of the street, which adapted it into the pedestrian zone. The present fountain is not on the same location as the old ones and is not identical in terms of architecture, but kept many elements from the old projects. Today located in front of the "Zora" palace (which hosts the Servantes Institute), it was sculptured by Aleksandar Deroko from the white Venčac marble, and is described as the "monument to the old fountain".

The street wasn't a continuous thoroughfare at the time, but was a succession of smaller alleys. Apart from Delijska Street, which was named during the Ottoman times, other sections were named by the Ministry of the Interior on 8 February 1848: Kalemegdanska (section from the modern Kralja Petra Street to the Kalemegdan Park) and Vojvodina (from the Kralja Petra to the Terazije). A short section of the Delijska Street remained and is today parallel with the modern Kneza Mihaila. It is the only Belgrade street whose name survived from the Ottoman period.

In the middle of the 19th century, the upper part of the street bordered the garden of Prince Alexander Karađorđević. After the implementation of the 1867 city of Belgrade regulation plan by Emilijan Josimović, the street soon gained its current look and architecture. Josimović’s plan marked the beginning of the city’s broader metamorphosis from oriental to the western urbanism. Prior to Josimović, only a short part of what is today Knez Mihailova, called ″Delijska street″, actually existed as a street. Works on construction of the new street began in spring of 1869. Josimović's plan successfully transformed the existing incomplete trail into the proper street which directly connected downtown Belgrade with the fortress, thus establishing a direct communication between the inner and outer neighborhoods. City founded its first street naming commission in 1864. The commission worked for 6 years, and the Knez Mihailova was the first street they named.

Houses were built there by the most influential and wealthiest families of the Serbian society, most of them merchants. In 1870, two years after the assassination of Prince Mihailo Obrenović, the city authorities officially named the street - Ulica Kneza Mihaila (Prince Michael Street) instead of ″Delijska″. The Hajduk Veljko kafana situated on the street, was the first location where the Belgraders could hear the phonograph, in 1896, while in 1906 it became the first cinema in the city.

=== 20th century ===
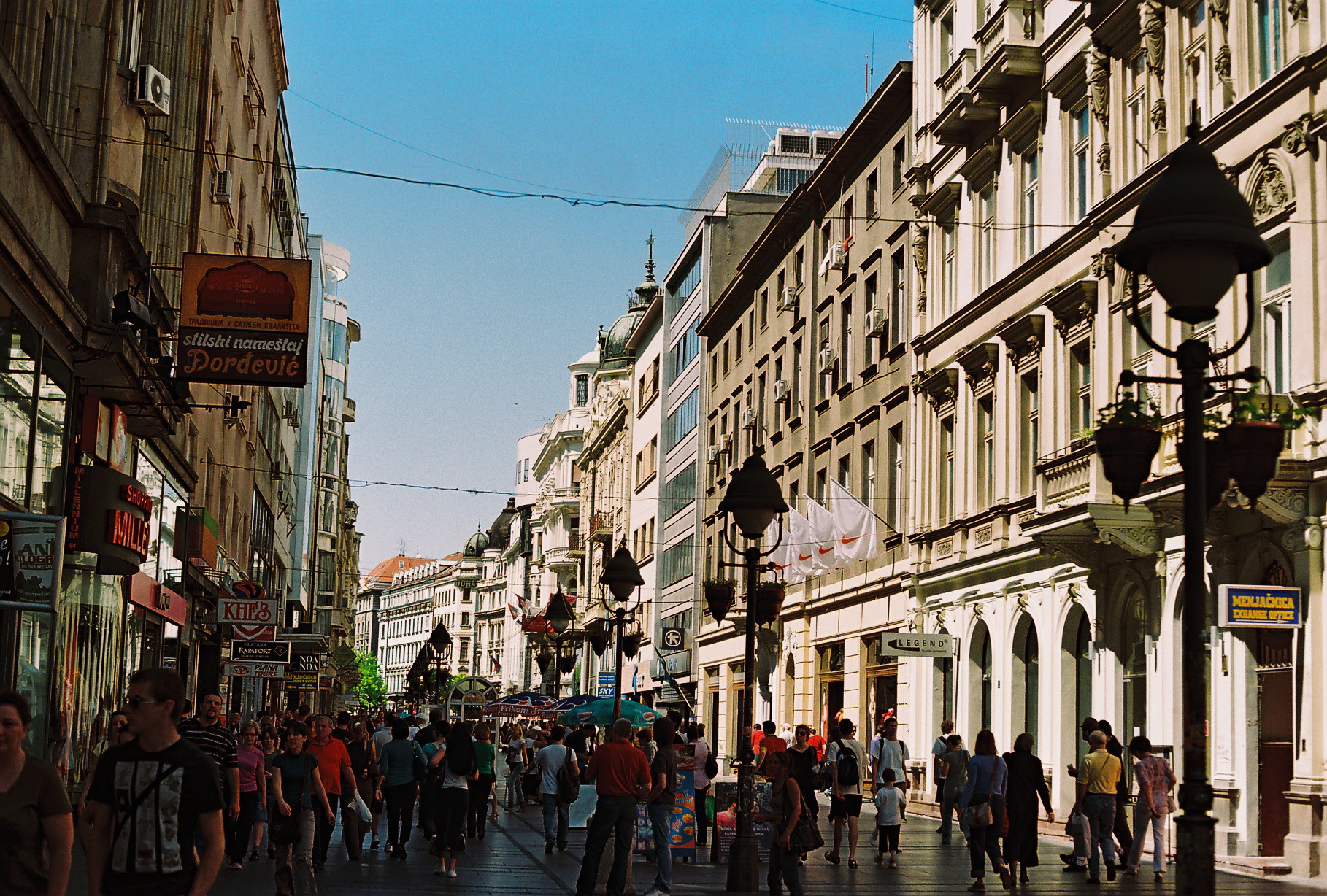
Knez Mihailova Street is converted into a pedestrian zone

In the early 20th century, a wealthy merchant Vlada Mitić opened the first department store in Belgrade at No. 41. It was the first building specifically projected to be a large, modern store. Mitić implemented the novelties like the delay in payment and modernized advertising of the goods.

Few years after the war, new Communist authorities banned religious processions, litije, claiming they are full of "reactionary elements". When Archbishop of Canterbury visited Belgrade in May 1946, huge crowd of people spontaneously gathered in the Knez Mihailova, effectively forming a procession. Seeing this as a hidden anti-regime event, the authorities dispatched the OZNA agents from their headquarters in the adjoining Obilićev Venac. Massive beating of the procession participants ensued, which resulted in dozens of injured and arrested.

Young volunteers, members of the Youth work actions, participated in the street's reconstruction in 1949. In 1980, the detailed regulatory plan for the street and its historical surrounding was adopted, which expired in 2021.

In the late 20th century, from mostly shopping area it evolved into the cultural center of the city. In 1987 there was a major reconstruction of Knez Mihailova and its transformation into the pedestrian zone. After six months of construction works, the street was open on 20 October 1987. It was paved with the black granite slabs from Jablanica, while a drinking fountain, made of white marble from Venčac, was erected in memory of former Delijska fountain which was further down the street. Previously nonexistent oak avenue through the middle of the street was also introduced, so as vintage looking candelabra which resemble the historical, gas ones. Commemorative plaque for Emilijan Josimović was placed near the “Ruski car” restaurant. During the reconstruction, when the old pavement was removed, an old plaque dedicated to the young volunteers who reconstructed the street in 1949, was found and the two plaques are now exhibited next to each other.

The entire project of the reconstruction was developed by architect and urbanist Branislav Jovin. Works began in May 1987, and were finished in six months, on 20 October. They also included introduction of the district heating which shut down 28 individual mechanical rooms in the street. Experts commission tried to change the project, especially paving of the 940 m (3,080 ft) long section from "Ruski Car" to Kalemegdan Park. The section, 16 to 28 m (52 to 92 ft) wide and covering 13,500 m^{2} (145,000 sq ft), was to be paved with the 8 cm (3.1 in) thick slabs of Jablanica granite, but the commission opposed this. City monuments preservation institute, on the other hand, objected to the planting of the oak avenue, with 14 trees, because the street had no trees before the reconstruction either. Jovin managed to push both of his ideas. In 1988 area around the Palace Albania, Hotel Majestic and “Jadran” cinema were also reconstructed, and a new fountain and mini-amphitheatre were placed in the section of the street where it enters the Republic Square.

=== 21st century ===
Reportedly, as of mid-2010s, much of the street's real estate is owned by Serbian tycoons of the day such as Dragan Đurić, Miroslav Mišković, Miodrag Kostić, Philip Zepter, Radomir Živanić, Vojin Lazarević, Tahir Hasanović, and Radivoje Dražević and it houses their respective business holdings.

In October 2020, a new, detailed regulatory plan was announced. The area is bounded by the streets Knez Mihailova, Kralja Petra, Uzun Mirkova, Studentski Trg, Vase Čarapića, Republic Square, Sremska, Maršala Birjuzova, Carice Milice, Cara Lazara, Gračanička and Pariska, and covers 18 ha (44 acres). Art historians and conservationists proposed the expansion of the Knez Mihailova's spatial unit (declared in 1964) to include Republic Square, green area along the Pariska Street and blocks surrounding Palace Albanija.

=== Notable buildings ===
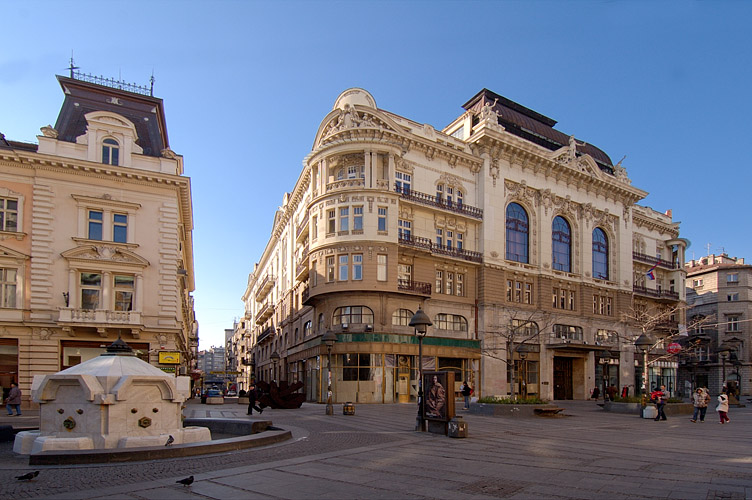
SANU headquarters in Knez Mihailova

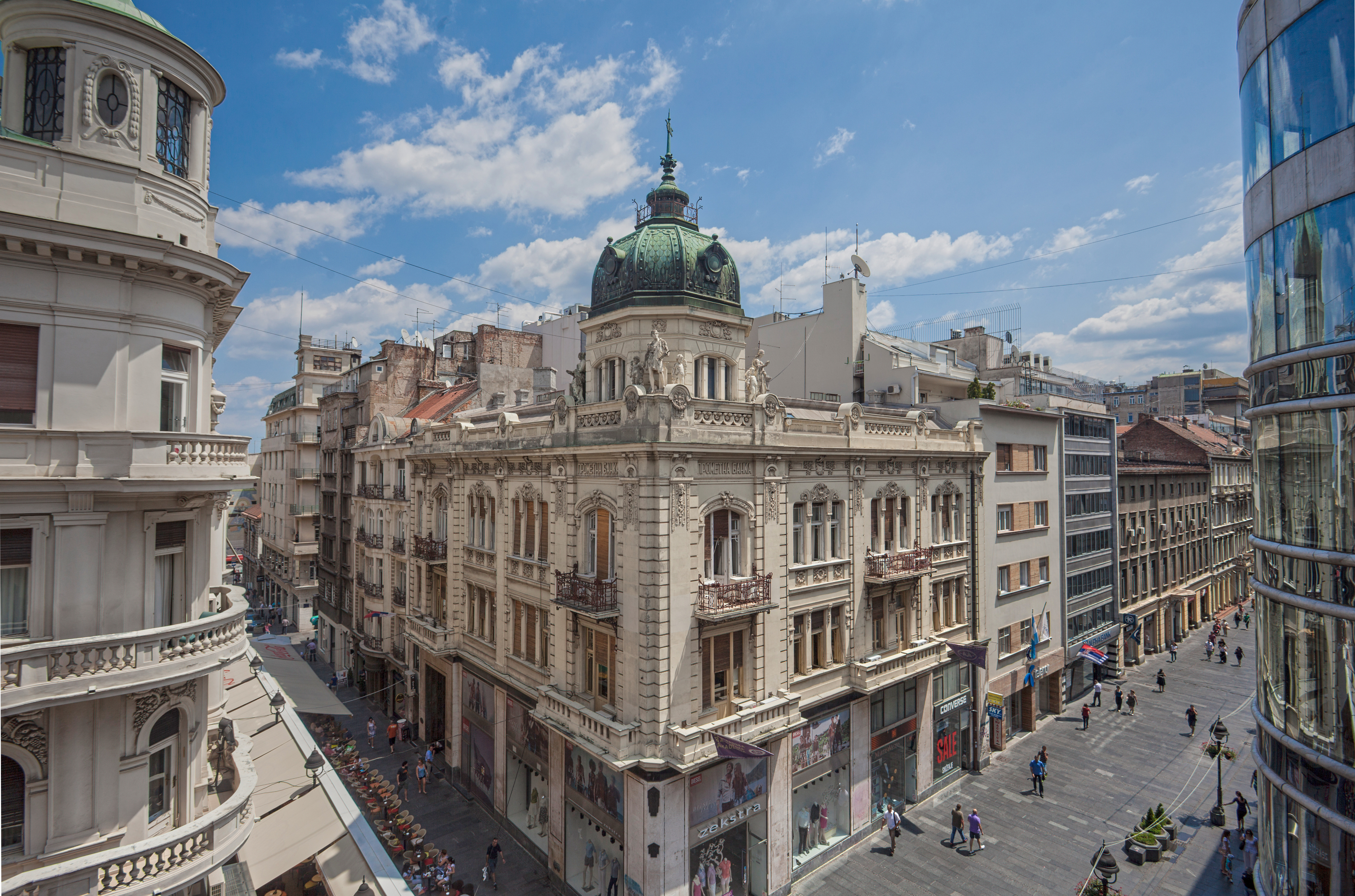
Commercial Bank Building

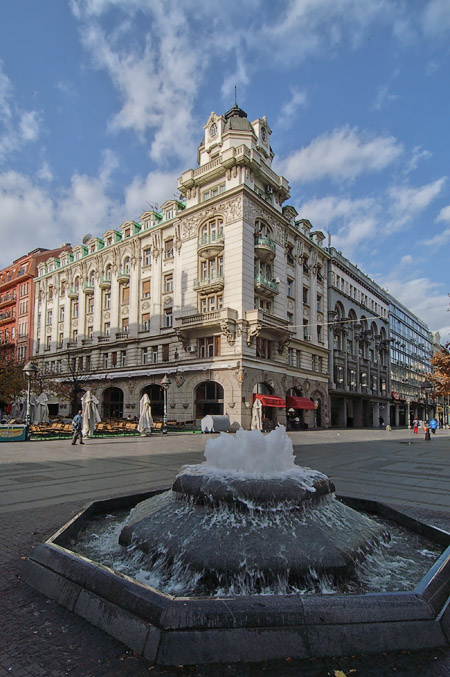
Corner with "Ruski car" restaurant

- Srpska Kruna Hotel, located at 56 Knez Mihailova Street, was built in 1869 in the style of romanticism. At the time it was considered Belgrade's most modern hotel. Between 1945 and 1970 the National Library of Serbia was located in this building. Today, the building houses the City of Belgrade library.
- Marko Stojanović's house, 53-55 Knez Mihailova Street, was built in 1889 as a private home of lawyer Marko Stojanović, in the renaissance style. The Academy of Fine Arts, established in 1937, used to be in the building but now the Gallery of the Academy is located there.
- Block of private homes, 46, 48 and 50 Knez Mihailova Street, built in the 1870s, represented the beginning of discontinuity with traditional "Balkan" architecture. Each of the three buildings are shaped in the same manner, a transitional style from romanticism to renaissance. The block consists of three buildings:
  - Hristina Kumanudi's house, located at 50 Knez Mihailova Street, was built in 1870 as a corner building at the intersection of Kneza Mihaila and Dubrovačka (later renamed Kralja Petra Street) streets by the Serbian merchant and banker of Greek origin Jovan Kumanudi who was also a prominent real estate investor and developer. Before it got built, an existing one-story house at the spot (Jovan Kumanudi's private residence where he also had a shop) got demolished. Kumanudi named the new building after his wife Hrisanta a.k.a. Hristina. The newly erected building housed the National Bank of the Kingdom of Serbia in the 1880s, and later the consulates of Belgium and Great Britain. The building was later purchased by Nikola D. Kiki (1841–1918), a Belgrade merchant of Aromanian origin. After his death, in his testament, he signed the building (along with two other city properties) over to the organization named Beogradska trgovačka omladina (Belgrade Merchant Youth) under conditions that they use the funds generated by the three properties to set up a hospital named The Nikola and Evgenija Kiki Endowment, which Kiki envisioned would provide medical help and services to poor and downtrodden merchants. Between 1937 and 1940, a hospital was built at 9 Zvečanska Street.
  - Kristina Mehana, located at 48 Knez Mihailova Street, built in 1869 as an administrative-commercial building in which Krstić brothers opened a hotel under the same name, and where meetings of the Belgrade City Assembly took place until the construction of the Assembly's own building. Today, the building houses the offices of Serbian Renewal Movement (SPO), Mona clothing store, Plato bookstore, and since 2004 Via del Gusto restaurant.
  - Veljko Savić's house, located at 46 Knez Mihailova Street, built in 1869 as a residential house with shops. It underwent many changes from its original look. Since 1950, it hosts the "Kolarac" restaurant.
- The Serbian Academy of Sciences and Arts' building, located at 35 Knez Mihailova Street, built from 1923 to 1924 according to the 1912 plans by Dragutin Đorđević and Andra Stevanović, in academic style with elements of secession. The building houses the Academy's library, one of the richest in Belgrade, as well as the Academy's archives containing numerous materials about the Serbian history, and furthermore on the ground floor — the Academy's gallery along with a lecture hall, bookstore, and antique shop.
- Nikola Spasić Endowment building, 33 Knez Mihailova Street, built in 1889, by the designs of the architect Konstantin Jovanović in the renaissance style, as a residential house of Belgrade merchant Nikola Spasić (1840–1916).
- Nikola Spasić Passage, 19 Knez Mihailova Street, built in 1912 in Secession style.
- Grčka Kraljica (Greek Queen) coffee shop, 51 Knez Mihailova Street, built in 1835 in style of academism. One of the oldest preserved buildings in Belgrade's old core, it originally housed an inn named Despotov Han until Jovan Kumanudi purchased it and changed its name to Kod Grčke kraljice (Greek Queen's).
- Ruski car (Russian Emperor) caffe & restaurant, angle of Knez Mihailova and Obilićev Venac streets built in 1926 in the late Art Nouveau and early Art Deco styles.
- Hotel Russia, 38 Knez Mihailova Street, built in 1870 and annexed in 1920. Today it houses business offices of the "Rudnap" company.
- Progres Palace, 27 Knez Mihailova Street. Former location of the decades old, famous Belgrade art gallery "Sebastijan". In 1996 city allowed for the "Progres" company to erect a building instead, but the company was conditioned by the city that a section facing the street must remain a gallery. In time, it became known as the "Gallery Progres". In June 2019, the crumbling company decided to sell the building part by part and one of the sequestered parts was a gallery, with company asking €6 million for it. City administration intervened, stating that either the buyer will be obliged to continue with the stipulated use of the space as a gallery, or the city will take over the gallery space as a collectible for the debts that "Progres" has to the city. City also pushed for the gallery to be declared a cultural monument, which was confirmed by the government in August 2019. The bronze statue of Mercury on rotating pedestal, monumental staircase and other features will have to be preserved. City claims that the intention is to open a gambling house or kafana instead and asked for the government to cease the sale. "Progres" reduced the price to €5.3 million, but gave up on selling in May 2020.

== Today ==
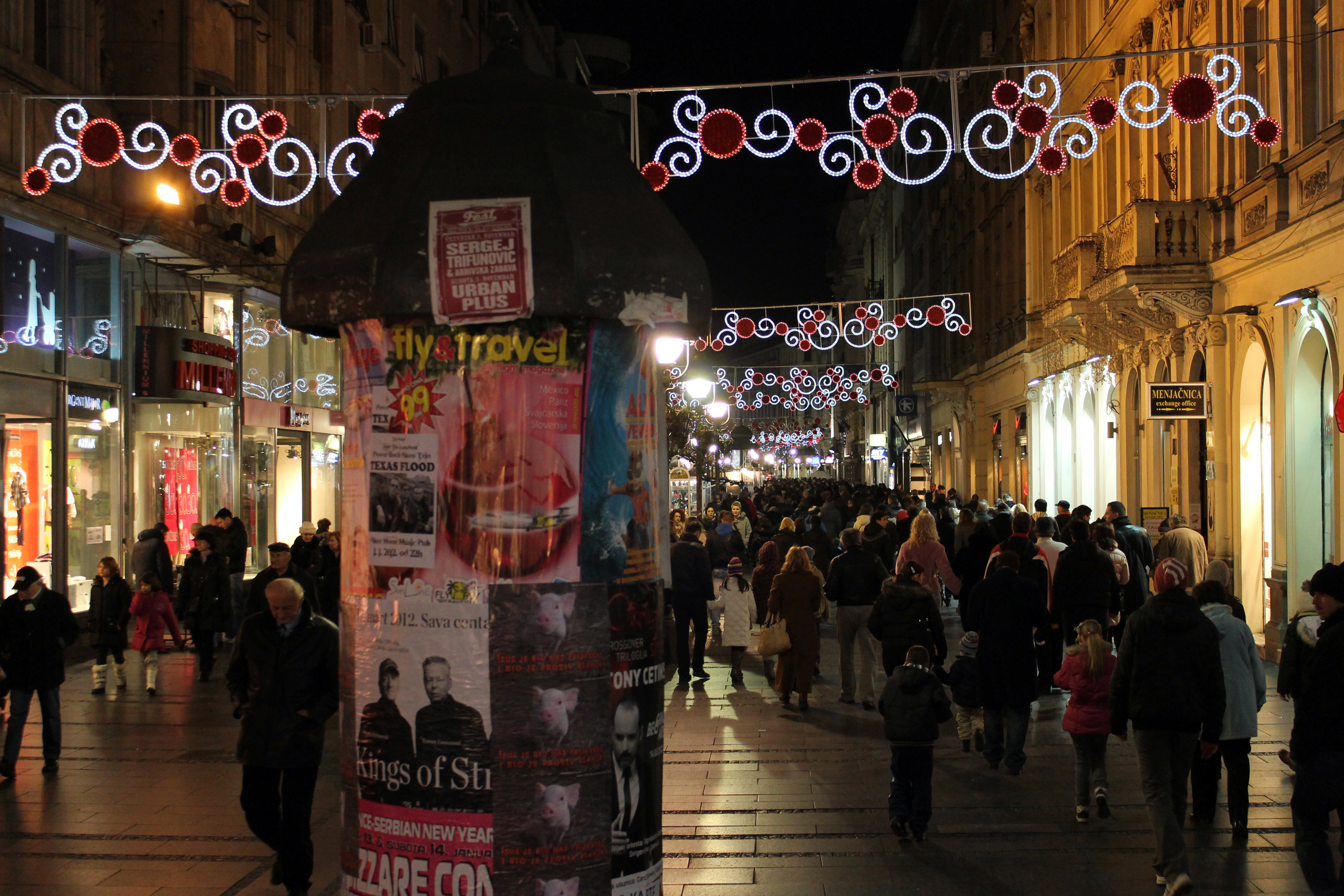
Knez Mihailova Street at night (January 2012)

Knez Mihailova is a common meeting point for Belgraders. The street a popular pedestrian zones in South East Europe and is a frequently filled with locals and tourists. Thousands of people stroll along the street every day as it is the shortest path from Terazije to Kalemegdan park and fortress.

The street is home to Serbian Academy of Sciences and Arts (SANU), Instituto Cervantes, Goethe-Institut, Institut français de Serbie, as well as many other leading shops and several cafes.

In December 2006, BusinessWeek magazine included the street as one of Europe's notable Christmas shopping sites. One can find international clothing brands such as Mango, Zara and Zara men, Gap, Nike men and women, Replay, Diesel, Terranova, Sephora, New Look, Swarovski, Cesare Paciotti, Tally Weijl, Miss Sixty, Bata, Bally, Aldo, Adidas, Vapiano, Monsoon Accessorize and many more shops.

Furthermore, the representative offices of various airlines such as Aeroflot, flydubai, Emirates, Qantas, Turkish Airlines, Qatar Airways, Ethiopian Airlines, Singapore Airlines and Air France are located in Knez Mihailova.

In terms of real estate value, the property in and around Knez Mihailova Street is among the most expensive in Belgrade. The latest confirmation of this occurred in late November 2007 when the 485m^{2} parcel belonging to state owned company Jugoexport was sold for €15 million, which works out to some €32,000 per square meter (~ $35,741 as of August 2016 rates).

=== Rajićeva Shopping Mall ===
Near the end of the street, between Knez Mihailova and Uzun Mirkova, a large complex of Rajićeva Shopping Mall was constructed. It was the location of the house of politician Toma Vučić Perišić. It was demolished in 1950 and the trolleybus roundabout was built, named Rajićeva, after the street. In 2000 an architectural design competition for this location was announced and the winning project was the one by Milan and Vladimir Lojanica. In 2003 the trolleybuses were removed from the location and in 2009 the government's permit for construction was granted. The construction itself was troubled and long. Fellow architects were mostly against the project. Zoran Manević, former president of the Club of Architects, called it a "monstrosity" while member of the Academy of Architecture, Branko Bojović, said there are many cultural issues why it shouldn't be built, naming just one of them, the Roman remains in this entire section of Belgrade, which are shallow and conserved under the ground. Another problem was the restitution as many objects were confiscated by the Yugoslav Communist authorities after the World War II. The construction dragged on for years. Israel investor, "ABD", daughter company of "Ashtrom", cited the reasons for that as the long and complicated process of obtaining permits, unregulated property ownership, archaeological explorations and financial problems due to the 2008 financial crisis. The complex consists of the shopping mall, the first in downtown Belgrade, with 15,300 m^{2} (165,000 sq ft), which was open on 14 September 2017. There is also an underground garage with 450 parking spots. Much larger section, a luxurious Mama Shelter hotel with 60,000 m^{2} (650,000 sq ft) was opened in March 2018.

The criticism of the project continued, both for its location in old section of Belgrade's downtown and the appearance of the building itself, which is described as an unfitting architecture for the location or as a "foreign body in Knez Mihailova". Architect Bojan Kovačević said that the edifice is twice the size of what was allowed in the beginning and that, with its capacity and appearance, it is a synonymous for the violence against the city. He asked: "is Rajićeva bringing any luck to Belgrade? Hardly". Writer and former ambassador Dragan Velikić called it "architectural abomination in the heart of Belgrade - steel jaws of the shopping mall which swallowed the building of the City Library", referring to the edifice as the Rajićeva Cave. Architect Slobodan Maldini said that the project ruined both the archaeological locality and the architectural core of the city, and that the protected zone of Knez Mihailova has been degraded by it.

Famous Serbian architect Mihajlo Mitrović, however, praised the project, saying that it is the pride of the contemporary architecture in the world. The project was awarded the prize for architecture at Belgrade's Architectural Salon and architect Snežana Ristić wrote: "There is lot of arguing about this object. Ones are against the modern object in the old city core and wish to see a polished, eclectic house like the ones with the 19th-century façades; others find lots of quality in this modern edifice for the modern times; third believe that shopping mall shouldn't be built at all and that some cultural venue should have been constructed instead; fourth still have nostalgic memories of an open space and trolleybuses roundabout". Architect Branislav Stojkov also praised the building and the small square on the Knez Mihailova side, stating that the architect beat the investor, as the building is full of light and air.

== Proposed projects ==
For decades, a 200 m (660 ft) long tunnel has been proposed in the ending section of the street. It would follow the route of the Pariska Street, between the streets of Gračanička and Uzun Mirkova, allowing the ground level to be turned into a plateau with a fountain. This extension of the Knez Mihailova Street would create a continuous pedestrian zone from the Terazije, Republic Square and Palace Albania to the Kalemegdan Park, the Belgrade Fortress and the rivers. It was envisioned by the first phase of the planned Belgrade Metro, 1973-1982.

A bit longer version, that would go from the Gračanička Street to the monument of Rigas Feraios in the Tadeuša Košćuškog Street, resurfaced in 2012, in conjunction with the project of connecting the Savamala port and the fortress. In March 2012 it was announced that the construction will start by the end of the year. However, the planners from the 1970s version were against the execution, because they believed that the entire complex could only exist, if there are already functioning subway lines, which as of 2018, are still not built. Due to the price, general halt of the subway construction and constant changes in its routes, the project hasn't materialized yet.

== See also ==
- Belgrade
- Mihailo Obrenović III, Prince of Serbia
- Singidunum
- Spatial Cultural-Historical Units of Great Importance
