= PRIZAD building =

- PRIZAD building
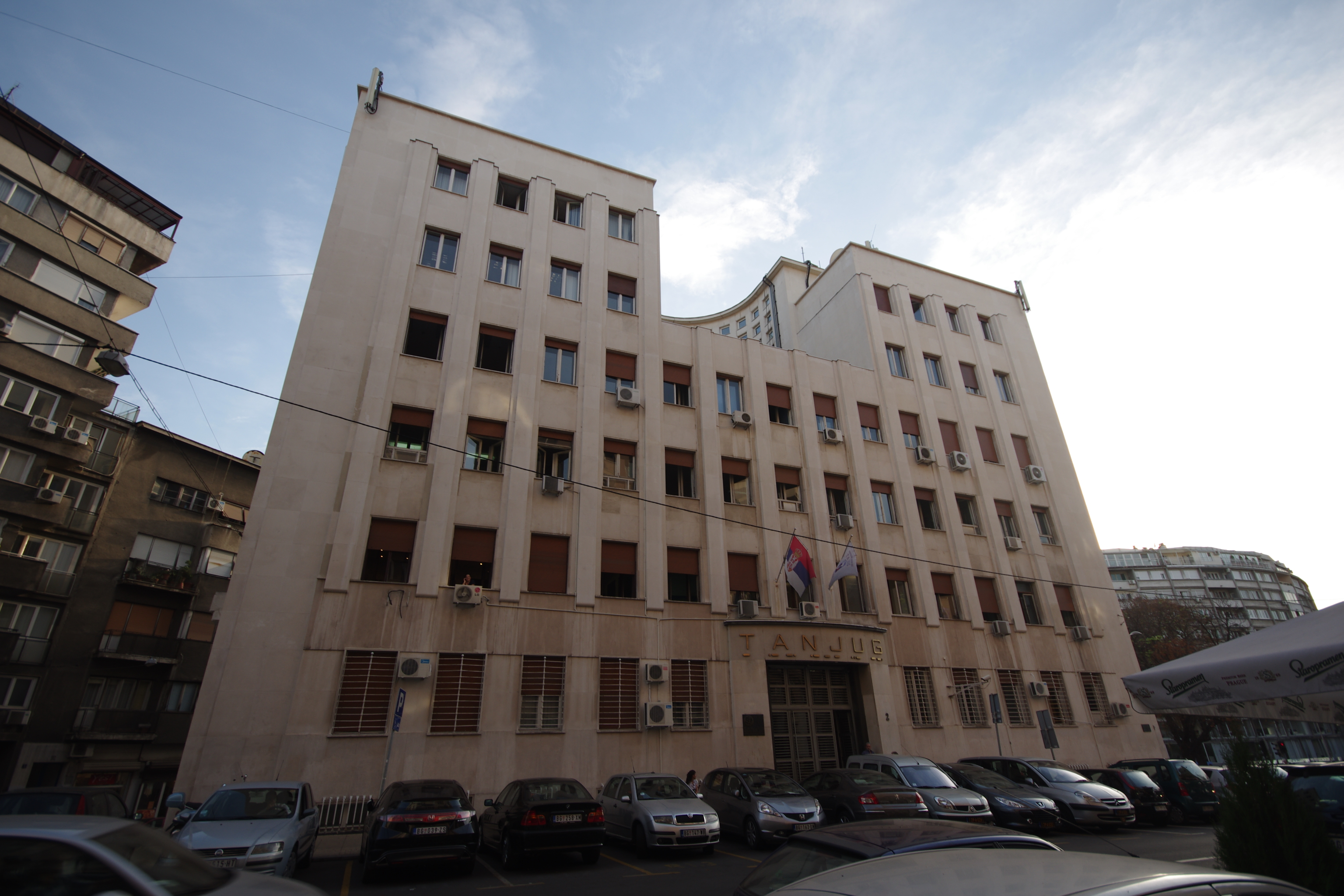
- Interactive map of PRIZAD building
- Location: Stari Grad, Belgrade, Serbia
- Coordinates: 44.8165°N 20.4559°E
- Type: Cultural monument
- Beginning date: 1937
- Competent institution for protection: Institute for the Protection of Cultural Monuments, Head office: Belgrade, Address 14, Kalemegdan, 11000 Official website

The PRIZAD building is in Belgrade, at 2 Obilićev venac. Because of its architectural and urban, cultural and historical value, the building has the status of a cultural monument.

The time before the outbreak of the Second World War was a time of growing instability, inflation and spiritual pressure of totalitarian regimes. The institution which erected the building – Privileged export company – strengthened on the wave of inflation and the need for countries to promote exports. Since it had a special significance for the economy of the country, but until then it operated in rented premises, the company raised its own, luxury, monumental home.

On the basis of a competition conducted in 1937, according to the project of the architect Bogdan Nestorović, the administrative building of the Privileged export joint stock company (PRIZAD) was built. Since the field falls naturally from Obilićev venac to the Sava River, the building found itself in a dominant position.

In designing this building of non-ornamental modernist architecture, there is a visible influence of architecture of totalitarian regimes (Italy and Germany), but also the influence of French monumentalism.
With its harmonious relationship of form and purified non-ornamental facades, the building is identified as a key achievement of Belgrade construction of the fourth decade of the last century, and it has a prominent place in the creative work of the architect Bogdan Nestorović.

After the war, the building was the seat of the OZNA. From the beginning of the 1960s, the building was the seat of TANJUG (Telegraphic Agency of New Yugoslavia), a very important public institution. From this time, a standing sculpture of Moše Pijade, a longtime journalist and publicist, was set in the lobby of the building.

== See also ==
- List of cultural monuments in Belgrade
