= Jovan Simić Bobovac =

Serbian politician (1775–1832)

Knez Jovan Simić Bobovac
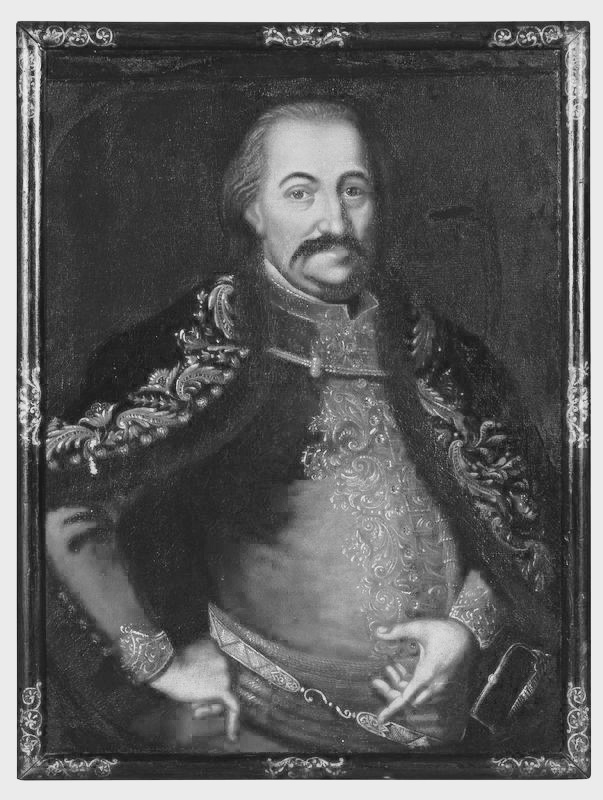
- Portrait, oil on canvas, ca. 1827
- Born: Jovan Simić; 17 August 1775; Bobova, Ottoman Empire
- Died: 26 July 1832 (aged 56) Bobova, Principality of Serbia
- Allegiance: Revolutionary Serbia; Principality of Serbia

Jovan Simić Bobovac (17. August 1775–26 July 1832) was a Serbian politician, who began his career as knez during the Ottoman period, participated in the Serbian Revolution (1804–17), and served as the President of the Serbian Supreme Court. He was one of the closest collaborators of Prince Miloš Obrenović.

== Background ==
He was born in 1775 in the village of Bobova (hence Bobovac), in the "Simić Hamlet" (Засеок Симића). The Simić brotherhood moved to Valjevo's Podgorina around the beginning of the 18th century from Polimlje area, Montenegro-Serbia border. On their way towards the Kingdom of Hungary with other refugees from Old Herzegovina and Old Montenegro, they stopped in Podgorina, at the foot of the Medvednik mountain (probably because the impassable hinterland provided security from the Ottomans). The hill beneath which the "Simić Hamlet" is still located today is called the "Simić peak" (Симића вис).

== Early career ==
It is known that he was a buljukbaša (hajduk commander) under the famous obor-knez beneath the Medvednik mountain, Ilija Birčanin. After the Slaughter of the Knezes Milić Kedić from Suvodanje was appointed the new obor-knez. Bobovac remained buljukbaša under Kedić, until the latter's death in 1809, when Bobovac was appointed a knez (a governor of a knežina, "district") in Revolutionary Serbia. The district was called "Bobovac's knežina" (Бобовчева кнежина).

== Principality of Serbia ==
On 6 October 1823 Prince Miloš Obrenović appointed Bobovac the President of the People's Court in Kragujevac (Deed No. 1932) and then president of the Belgrade People's Court (after knez Milosav Zdravković), at which position he remained until 1828, when he was made commander of the Serbian Army on the Drina sent to prevent the surge of Ottoman Bosnians into Mačva.

After the liberation of Serbia marked by the first Hatt-i humayun in 1830, Prince Miloš's priority became to settle the Drina Valley with Serb population. But due to the increasingly numerous and violent conflicts between the Muslim occupants and the newcomers from the Dinara region, particularly from Grahovo (now in Montenegro), Prince Miloš sent Bobovac from Belgrade to the region of Azbukovica to join knez Jevrem Obrenović and Petar Vasić in supervising and hastening the relocation of the Muslims who did not accept the provisions of the Hatt-i humayun, which unambiguously ordered the compulsory eviction of Ottomans from Serbia, except those registered in the territories of the garrison posts. This decision was particularly opposed by the Muslims in the villages by the Drina and around the town of Soko. Bobovac began his mission together with the abovementioned chiefs at the end of February, 1830. In April he already came into conflict with the Muslims whom Husein Pasha from Belgrade had called upon by decree (buruntia) to return to their former estates and continue to farm them as they had before the eviction. Until August of the same year Muslims returned en masse to the Soko district, and by January 1831 they had practically all returned. During that time Bobovac had several conflicts with these, who wrote to Prince Miloš about it on March 9/21 threatening that they "will not leave until there are dead bodies". Despite the complex situation, Bobovac managed to complete the task entrusted to him by Miloš in 1831, but at the cost of a serious conflict with some of the Muslim chiefs which was to have tragic consequences for him and his life several months later.

== Last years and death ==
Although Bobovac, according to his contemporaries, was an exceptionally "great friend of Prince Miloš", towards the end of his lifetime he supported the defenders of the Serbian Constitution in their wish to restrict Miloš's absolutism. Records suggest that Bobovac fell into disfavour with Miloš. But that fact has to this day failed to shed light on the exact cause of his sudden death on July 14/26, 1832. Namely, after Bobovac was ambushed by a never identified group of people, who could more probably have been Muslims from the Soko district seeking revenge due to Bobovac's role in their relocation to Bosnia, Bobovac died from his wounds, at the age of 67. He was buried on July 15/27, 1832 by the church in Kamenica (Valjevo), his endowment.

== Legacy ==
In the villages beneath the Medvednik is still taught the tale of the "Church built by knez Jovan Simić Bobovac, but burned down by the Turks after the failure of the First Serbian Uprising (1804)", when the local people fled to the mountain. It is also mentioned in the Memoirs of protoiereus Mateja Nenadović, and the letters he exchanged with prince Miloš Obrenović have also been preserved in the Serbian Archive.

Today there are five households in the Simić hamlet in the village of Bobova. The descendants of knez Jovan Simić Bobovac mostly live in Bobova (the Radisav–Simić family), Valjevo, Belgrade and Brussels (the families of Desanka Maksimović, Vasilije Simić and Gillès de Pélichy).

== See also ==
- List of Serbian Revolutionaries

== Bibliography ==
- Miličević, Milan Đ. "Pomenik znamenitih ljudi u Srpskoga naroda novijeg doba", pp. 37 and 38 (1887) and "Kneževina Srbija", I, Beograd (1876), p. 525;
- Ministarstvo Finansija Kraljevine Srbije, "Ustanove i Finansije obnovljene Srbije do 1842", Tom 2, p. 402, 408, 562, 582-589, (1899);
- Stojančević, Vladimir "Istorija srpskog naroda", V, SKZ, Beograd (1981), pp. 24 and 49;
- Jevtić, Milan M. "Podrinje u srpskoj revoluciji", Godišnjak Istorijskog Arhiva VIII, Šabac, (1970), p. 330;
- Perović, Radoslav "Prvi srpski ustanak: Akta i pisma na srpskom jeziku", Beograd, Narodna knjiga (1977), p. 162;
- Arhiv Srbije, Beograd, Fond: "Kneževa kancelarija", (1831), pp. 329–330;
- Group of authors in "Azbukovica, zemlja, ljudi i život", Samoupravna interesna zajednica kulture opštine, Ljubovija, (1985), pp. 119 and 383.

External links
