= Zeleni Venac =

Zeleni Venac Зелени венац
- Urban neighbourhood
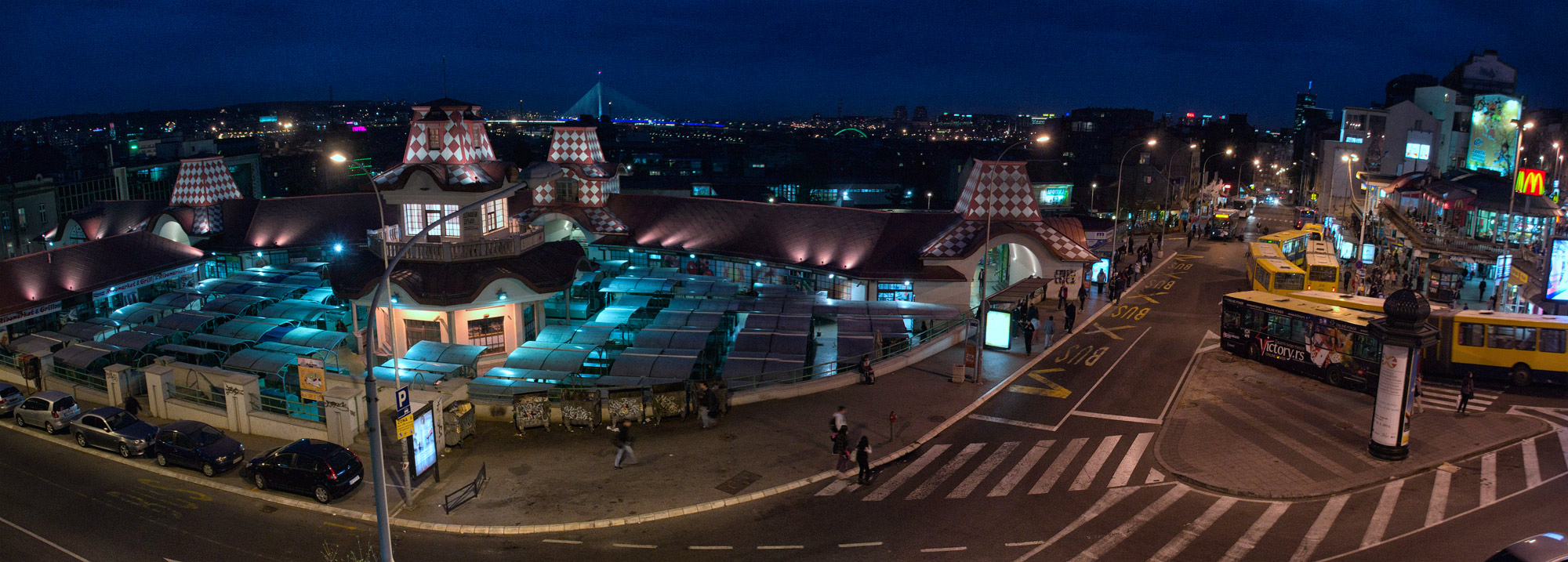
- View of Zeleni Venac and the market
- Etymology: Green wreath
- Nickname: Зелењак (Zelenjak)
- Location within Belgrade
- Coordinates: 44°48′47″N 20°27′09″E
- Country: Serbia
- Region: Belgrade
- Municipality: Savski Venac; Stari Grad
- Local community: Zeleni Venac
- Established: 1828

Population (2011)
  - Total: 2,713
- Time zone: UTC+1 (CET)
  - Summer (DST): UTC+2 (CEST)
- Area code: +381(0)11
- Car plates: BG

Zeleni Venac (Serbian Cyrillic: Зелени венац) or colloquially Zelenjak (Serbian Cyrillic: Зелењак) is an urban neighborhood of Belgrade, the capital of Serbia. It is located in the Belgrade's municipalities of Savski Venac (major part) and Stari Grad.

== Location ==
Zeleni Venac is located in downtown Belgrade, just few minutes away to the east of Terazije, the designated center of the city, down the Prizrenska or Sremska streets. It borders the neighborhood of Savamala to the south, while the northern border is Brankova Street which separates it from the neighborhoods of Kosančićev Venac and Varoš Kapija in the municipality of Stari Grad. The car tunnel (Terazije Tunnel) under Terazije connects it to Republic Square while underground pedestrian passage connects it to Terazije and Prince Michael Street via Prizrenska and Sremska streets, respectively. Park Luka Ćelović is on the southeast border of the neighborhood.

== History ==
=== Antiquity ===
Northern part of modern neighborhood was a Roman necropolis from the 3rd century, the southwestern necropolis of Singidunum, predecessor of modern Belgrade. The remains of the ancient graveyard were discovered during the construction works in the 1930s when the Brankova Street was extended to the Sava river, to make a connection to the King Alexander Bridge, which was finished in 1934. At 16 Brankova Street a Roman tomb was discovered in 1931, with ceramics and coins from the period of the emperors Aurelian and Claudius Gothicus. The grave was made from the reused parts of stele. The sandstone plaque has a niche with a human bust and the inscription naming Valerius Longinus as a builder of the memorial for his son, a veteran Valerius Maximinus. There was another tombstone, crushed into pieces, dedicated by Maximinus' wife. Several other well preserved graves were discovered in the direction of the Pop Lukina and Karađorđeva streets.

Also during the Interbellum, in Kamenička Street, a golden polyhedron shaped earring from the early Middle Ages (Great Migration Period) was discovered. When the foundations for the building of the Medical Association were dug on Zeleni Venac, more than 4 kg of the Late Roman coins were discovered. They originated from the 5th century. Some remains were discovered during the 2018 construction of the hotel at 20 Jug Bogdanova Street.

=== 19th century ===
==== Pond ====
Zeleni Venac is built in the area that was previously part of the trench which surrounded the Kalemegdan fortress in the 18th century. When the trench was covered, a pond was formed. As Belgrade grew around it, the pond became a popular hunting attraction (for fowls, ducks, etc.) for the inhabitants of Belgrade. The pond was filled from the streams flowing down from Terazije (from the springs below modern Hotel Moskva via a modern Prizrenska Street) and Varoš Kapija (via Gospodska, modern Brankova Street). A canal was dug in the 1830s which drained the pond in the direction of Bara Venecija. Only then the area began to properly urbanize. Apart from hunting, the area became one of the favorite excursion sites of the Belgraders, including the royals, like Princess Ljubica Obrenović. There were meyhanes on the shores so as ferrymen with boats for transportation of the excursionists.

==== Cemetery ====
A cemetery, Old Belgrade Cemetery, was located in the area. During the Ottoman period it served as the burial ground for the Belgrade Serbs, until Prince Miloš Obrenović ordered the relocation of the graveyard to Tašmajdan in 1826. The relocation was finished by 1828. The old cemetery was situated along the modern Pop Lukina Street, above the Town's Gate (Varoš Kapija), one of the four gates at the entry points into the town. The cemetery was divided in two sections: Great cemetery (Veliko groblje) on the slope where the modern Brankova Street is, and Plague cemetery (Kužno groblje), close to the Hôtel Palace. However, only the deceased who had descendants, especially if they could pay for it, were relocated. The poor and those without offspring were left on the old location. Works on the relocation were fully stopped in 1835.

==== Name ====
The name of the neighborhood means the green wreath. Venac is usually used in Belgrade's geography in term of a round street (Obilićev Venac, Kosančićev Venac) or a rim of the river (Savski Venac, Dunavski Venac). However, in this case, it is used in the word's initial usage, meaning wreath. One of the first houses built in the neighborhood was a two-storey house at 1 Gospodska Street. It was rented by Sophia Hermann from Saxony, young widow of a hatmaker. The couple migrated to Belgrade in 1838, but after her husband's death, she decided to quit the hat making business, rented the house and turned it into the kafana. The venue had no name on it but had a tin-made green wreath hanging on the façade. She picked the wreath as the kafana still faced at the cemetery. Hermann established the venue around 1840 and operated it with her daughters. During Interbellum, the name Zeleni Venac spread to the entire neighborhood.

Kafana was demolished in the 1960s. and on its location there is a McDonald's restaurant today. Belgrade historians still debate whether the neighborhood was named after the kafana or the opposite. Another well-known kafana in the neighborhood was the "Amerika". It was notorious for the oriental music, belly dancers and prostitution.

==== Theatre ====
The government decided in 1850 to build the National Theatre here. The Theatre Board insisted on this location as it was on the route of the main road which connected Varoš Kapija with Savamala and Vračar. Some public figures objected, and Vuk Karadžić commented that the chosen location is ćorbudžak prema sredini beogradske varoši, the edge compared to the downtown. Italian architect Josif Kasano was chosen because he had experience building on the marshy terrain in Venice. By the middle of the 19th century, the pond was partially drained, but the area proved to be too marshy and unstable. The foundations were laid down but it showed that Kasano wasn't that experienced as the terrain remained rich in underground waters which continued to flow down the Terazije ridge. This required expensive massive deep foundations so the Theatre Board almost went bankrupt and the works stopped in 1857, draining large amount of money. Experts of the day concluded that the draining wasn't done professionally as it drained the pond but turning the terrain into the "underwater" one. The idea was abandoned and the theater was constructed on another site, on the modern Republic Square. Some of the foundation remains were removed when the market was built in the 1920s. However, some parts of the completely forgotten foundations were rediscovered during the 2005-2006 reconstruction of Zeleni Venac. In the early 20th century the pond was drained completely but the remnant of the pond is the large underground water spring under the green market.

==== Square ====
Between the Brankova and Jug Bogdanova streets there was an old farmers' market, while in the south part of the neighborhood, at the corner of the Lomina and Kamenička streets there was a drinking fountain. Named the Gypsy Fountain (Ciganska česma), it was a one-pipe fountain producing 259 gr (16.8 g) of water per second. Area of the modern market was arranged as a square by the 1876 city urban plan, but was later transformed into a park. The main landmark of the neighborhood, the Zeleni Venac green market, was open on this location in 1926.

==== Gathering place ====
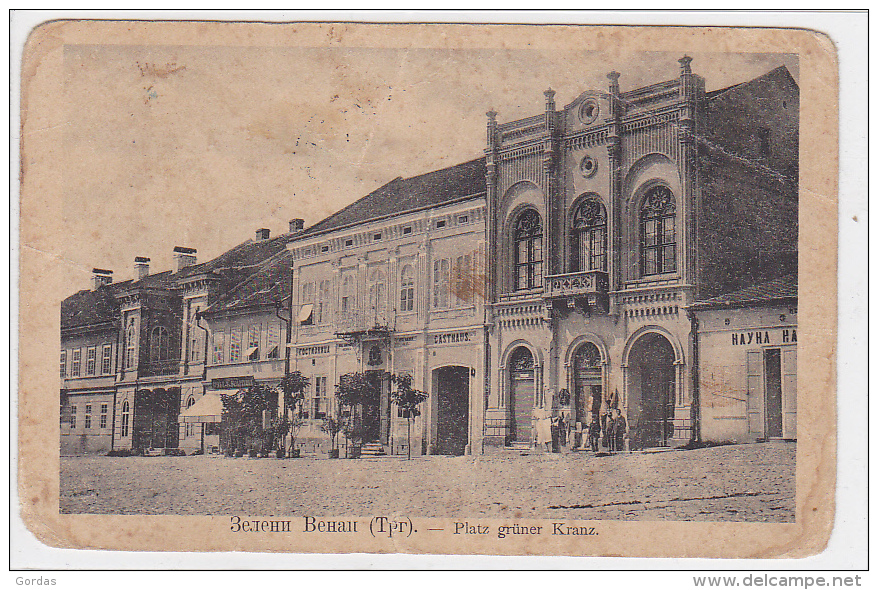
A photo of Zeleni Venac from the early 20th century

Merchant Maksim Ranković from Ostružnica founded a drink store and built a two-storey house after the pond was drained. He sold his house to the state which turned it into the Belgrade District Court, while the drink store was made a jail. The participants of the unsuccessful Katan Rebellion in 1844 were imprisoned here. The area later became a gathering place of the revolutionaries and socialists, as the beginning of the Abadžijska čaršija (Tailors bazaar) was beginning here and the masters had numerous young apprentices who were prone to Socialism. They were gathered and organized by Svetozar Marković, leader of the Socialism in Serbia. In 1871 their newspapers Radnik began to be printed in Zeleni Venac, while another Socialist printing press was installed later. There was also a socialist library. Local kafanas remained the gathering place for the progressive high school and university students, workers, merchants, craftsmen and activists in the next decades. Kafana Zlatna Moruna was a gathering place and an unofficial base of the members of Young Bosnia revolutionary movement, prior to the 1914 Assassination of Archduke Franz Ferdinand of Austria, a prelude to World War I, including Gavrilo Princip and Mustafa Golubić.

A massive building, the Serbian Medical Society House, was finished in the early 1932 at the corner of the Kraljice Natalije and Prizrenska streets.

=== 20th century ===
==== Bus terminus ====
After the farmers market was opened in 1926, Zeleni Venac became a terminus for the omnibuses to the interior (Lazarevac, Valjevo, Banja Koviljača, Zvornik, etc.). After the construction of the King Alexander Bridge in 1934, which directly conducted traffic to Zeleni Venac, number of coach lines increased, while public transportation was also conducted across the neighborhood: tram No. 14 to downtown Zemun, and bus No. 34 to Zemun's Novi Grad. The bridge was demolished during World War II, routes to Zemun disconnected, so after 1947 it was decided to make Zeleni Venac a public transportation hub as downtown Terazije became congested.

Tram No. 14 was replaced by bus, and after Branko's Bridge was finished in 1956 and No. 14 again extended to downtown Zemun, it was replaced with trolleybuses. It was the first line which used Zeleni Venac as terminus. Due to the rapid urban development of Zemun and New Belgrade, it was joined by the bus line No. 15 (Zemun Novi Grad) in 1958 and No. 16 in 1959 (Pohorska Street, New Belgrade). Line No. 14 was extended to Zemun's Gornji Grad and parallel, shortened line, No. 14-A to Zemun's Branko Radičević Square, was also introduced.

The underground pedestrian passage and a platform for the large public transportation terminus was opened on 28 November 1967. Author of the entire project, which regulated one of the busiest crossroads in the city at time with 100,000 vehicles daily, was Olga Divac. The passage is 5 m (16 ft) wide and layered with marble. The exits in the directions of the Prizrenska, Carice Milice and Sremska streets are steps, while it is on the same level as the terminus. Total area of both objects is 5,288 m^{2} (56,920 sq ft).

Number of lines increased, to numerous outer neighborhoods. The trolleybuses were all replaced by the buses, and new, ever-changing lines included No. 16-B (Dr Ivan Ribar, New Belgrade), No. 16-E (Blokovi#Block 45), No. 16-G (Block 70, New Belgrade), No. 36 (Ledine, New Belgrade), No. 36-B (Studentski Grad, New Belgrade), No. 36-V (Heating plant, New Belgrade), No. 52, No. 53, No 56, No. 56-L, No. 60 (New Belgrade), No. 67 (New Belgrade), No. 68 (New Belgrade), No. 71 (Ledine), No. 84, lines for Bežanijska Kosa and Belgrade Airport express lines for Batajnica and Zemun Polje.

In few decades, Zeleni Venac became synonymous with hectic public transportation in Belgrade, and constant traffic congestions. As there wasn't enough place, starting bus stops were moved on the opposite side of the Jug Bogdanova Street for some lines, while for the others the starting points were relocated downhill the street, in the direction of the Branko's Bridge. Plans for relocation of the terminus were made already in to 1970s, but remained on paper.

As of April 2023, 16 lines of Belgrade's public transportation grid starting at Zeleni Venac were: No. 15 (Zemun Novi Grad), No. 52 (Cerak Vinogradi, Čukarica), No. 53 (Vidikovac, Rakovica), No. 56 (Petlovo Brdo, Rakovica), No. 56-L (Čukarička Padina, Čukarica), No. 60 (Heating plant), No. 60-L (same, different route), No. 67 (Block 70-A, New Belgrade), No. 68 (Block 70), No. 71 (Ledine), No. 72 (Belgrade Nikola Tesla Airport), No. 75 (Bežanijska Kosa), No. 84 (Nova Galenika, Zemun), No. 704 (Zemun Polje), No. 706 (Batajnica), No. 707 (Zemun Polje, different route). Additionally, there were 5 lines crossing through Zeleni Venac: No. 16, No. 27E, No. 35, No. 65, No. 77, No. 95, and EKO 1.

==== Murder of Dragan Maksimović ====
Actor Dragan Maksimović was murdered in Zeleni Venac. On 18 November 2000, a group of skinhead hooligans, supporters of FK Rad, brutally attacked him erroneously assuming he was Romani. Succumbing to the injuries, Maksimović died on 4 February 2001. The perpetrators were never apprehended. On the initiative by film director Goran Marković, a commemorative plaque was placed at Zeleni Venac on 18 November 2006. Inscription on the plaque says: On this place, on 18 November 2000, actor Dragan Maksimović was beaten by the bullies. He didn't manage to survive the consequences of this attack. He died on 4 February 2001. We condemn the violence and don't forget. His Belgraders.

=== 21st century ===
In 2015, city announced massive reorganization of the city's public transportation. It included relocation of the large terminus at Zeleni Venac, for numerous city lines. The buses were still planned to pass, but the terminus was to be removed. However, almost nothing of this plan hasn't been done anywhere in the city. In August 2021, city administration announced new plan for the neighborhood. It still includes the relocation of the terminus, and its location will be adapted into the art center with scenic viewpoint. Further plans were announced in November 2021 which envisioned higher structures and reduction of traffic surfaces, even though the neighborhood is one of the most congested in Belgrade.

In June 2022, city announced reconstruction of the Terazije Terrace and the adjoining sections of Zeleni Venac. Project consists of three phases, marked by the streets, of which the latter two deal with Zeleni Venac itself: Balkanska-Kraljice Natalije, Kraljice Natalije-Lomina, and Lomina-Gavrila Principa. The area should be on top of the Sava-Danube tunnel. Construction of this tunnel was tentatively scheduled for 2023, when the first phase of the terrace should also start. Phase two should be finished in 2025. Over a century old idea of making the terrace into the scenic viewpoint, from downtown Terazije, over Zeleni Venac, to the Sava, and across it further in the Syrmia, was discarded by architect and member of the Serbian Academy of Sciences and Arts Milan Lojanica, who stated that "(this idea) is completely disavowed in our time by the gigantic structures in Belgrade Waterfront, erected right between the terrace and the Sava".

== Administration ==
Historical population
Year	Pop.	±%
1981	4,126	—
1991	3,604	−12.7%
2002	3,517	−2.4%
2011	2,713	−22.9%

Zeleni Venac, historically part of Savamala, is organized as a local community (mesna zajednica), a sub-municipal unit within the Savski Venac. According to the 2011 census of population, the neighborhood had 2,713 inhabitants.

== Wildlife ==
It was recorded in 1994 that a bat species of Kuhl's pipistrelle inhabits Zeleni Venac. The species was previously unknown in Serbia. By the 2010s, it became the dominant bat species in all major urban areas in the country.

== Features ==
=== Zeleni Venac farmers market ===
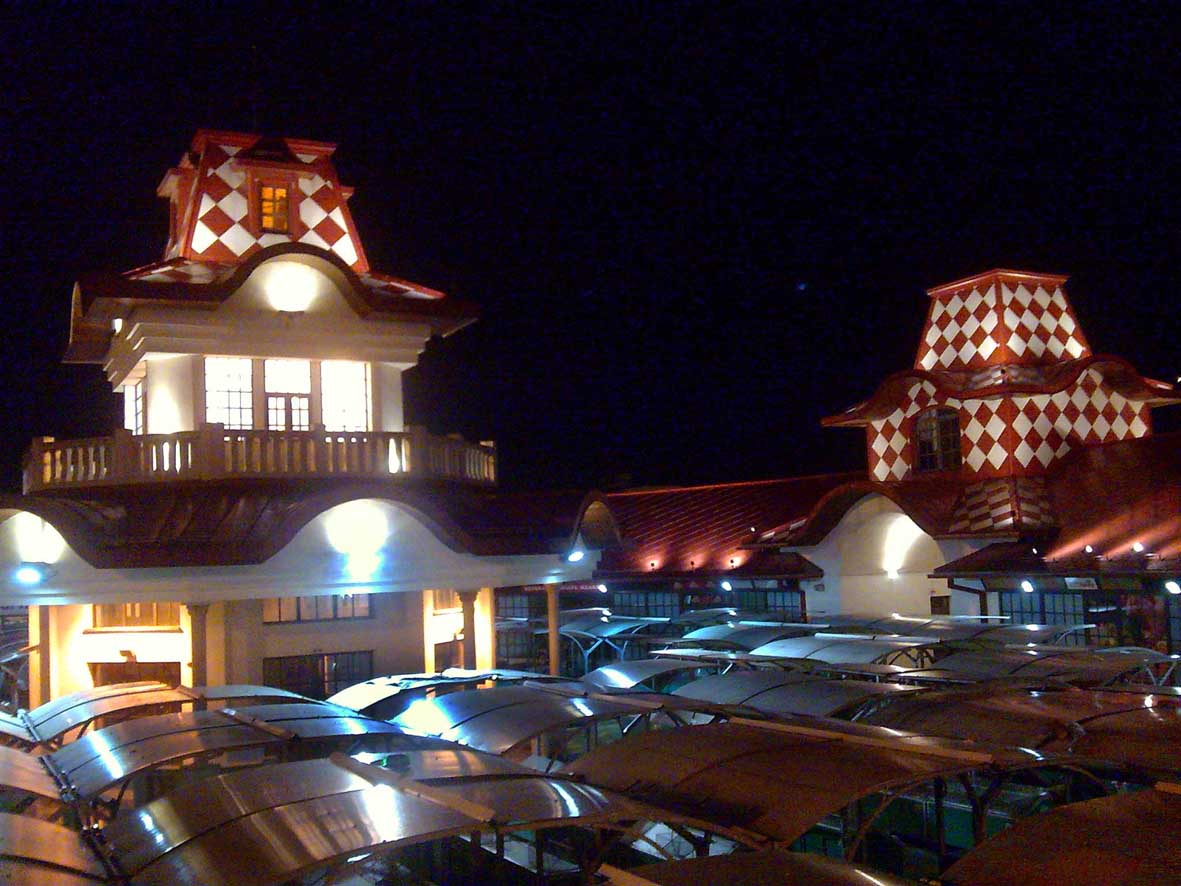
Zeleni Venac Market

The major feature by which Zeleni Venac is known today is the open market of the same name (Serbian: Пијаца Зелени венац, Pijaca Zeleni venac), one of largest in Belgrade. Also one of the major terminal stations of the city's public transportation, with almost 20 bus lines beginning there, is located next to the market.

Originating from 1847, Zeleni Venac is the oldest still active green market in Belgrade and due to its size, longevity and wide varieties of goods that can be bought in it, it has been nicknamed "Queen of the markets" and placed under the state protection. The market was open in 1926 and was intended to be the central city open market, being closest to the city center. It was the most modern open farmers market on the Balkans at that time as it included running water, sewage system, brick-walled shops and stores and gauged weighing scales.

The first assembly of the greengrocers was held in Zeleni Venac in 1918. Construction of the market began in 1920. It originally also occupied the area of the modern bus terminus, on the foundations of the ill-fated National Theatre. One of the reasons why city administration decided to build the market was to remove farmers who were illegally selling goods from the ox-wagons in Terazije, city's downtown. Originally, the market stalls were wooden ones, made by the sellers themselves. Only the wealthiest sellers had trucks to deliver goods to the markets, majority still used the ox carts. The good was transported mostly from the Belgrade surroundings (Višnjica, Slanci, Veliko Selo, Ovča, Borča, Obrenovac). The architecture of the market, which includes the specific and recognizable "broken" roofs, was designed by architect Veselin Tripković. On the side of the Kraljice Natalije Street there is a three-piped drinking fountain embedded into the market's outer wall. There is a memorial plaque, commemorating Vojislav Stojković Keka and his sister Vera, originally from Golemo Selo near Vranje, who donated the fountain to the Belgraders.

A thorough reconstruction of the market, which was supposed to give back the market its original looks, began in June 2005 and was completed in 2007. As the entire Terazije slope, including Zeleni Venac, is very active mass wasting area, it caused much of the public and academic debate during the reconstruction, especially when massive rains resulted in sliding which ruptured the streets around the market as if they were hit by a very strong earthquake. After the completion, the market became a multi-leveled, two-stored complex with the lowest section partially below the ground. The communal infrastructure was completely renewed, a special parking lot was built, and the area was protected from future mass wasting.

Municipal government of Savski Venac began turning the underground passage into an exhibition gallery. For now, it includes 20 exhibition panels set for the official Belgrade holiday, Belgrade Days, in April 2008, but soon individual panel cameras and sound system with loudspeakers for 24-hour-a-day classical music play will be also installed.

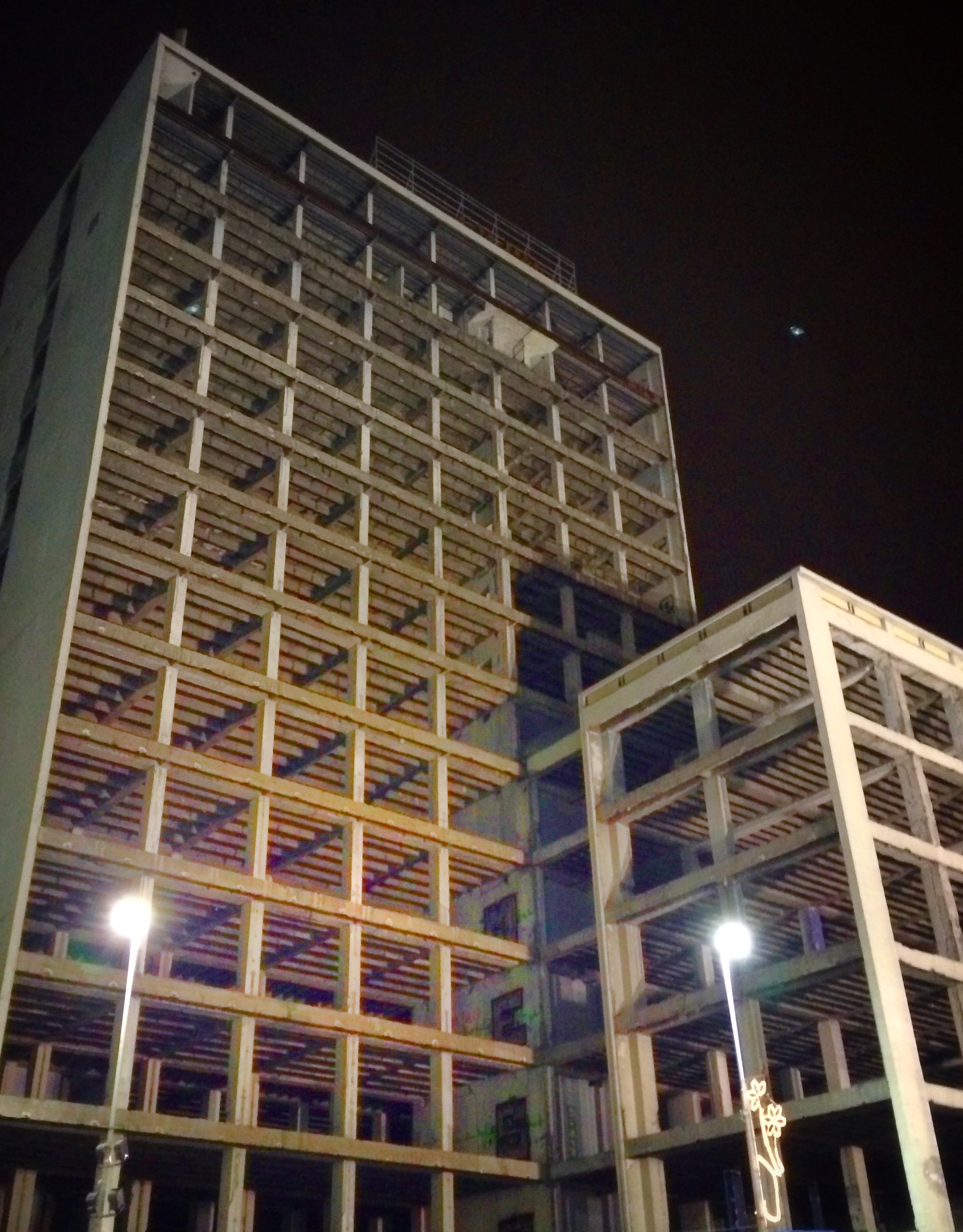
Frame of the Beobanka building

=== Beobanka building ===
The most protruding feature in the neighborhood is the 13-storey Beobanka building, at the corner of Zeleni Venac and Carice Milice streets. The building is described as being on "excellent position" for business, with good commuting connectivity, but also being quite visible in city's landscape and with great scenic view on the city. It was built in 1960 and projected by Milica Šterić for the Energoprojekt holding, but later became the property of Beobanka. Šterić was awarded the Sedmojulska nagrada for the project, the highest state prize in Serbia at the time. The bank filed for bankruptcy in 2002, so the building became property of the state in 2007 and of the city of Belgrade in 2012. It is part of the "Old Belgrade" Spatial Cultural-Historical Unit, which is under the "preliminary protection".

The building has a total floor area of 8,300 m^{2} (89,000 sq ft). It turned out that it has several major inadequacies: it doesn't comply with the modern seismic regulations, the last two floors were added later and are unusable today due to the damages and the entire building has only 5 parking spots. Ministry of justice, which administered the building after 2007, decided to adapt it into the seat of several courts and state agencies. In 2009 the renovation began: the building was emptied, installations and internal walls removed but the works stopped when it was discovered that asbestos has been used for the facade. It wasn't banned when the building was constructed, but in documentation there was no mention of asbestos. Ministry calculated that the reconstruction of the facade and removal of asbestos would cost too much, so they handed over the building to the city in 2012. The building is left in the "stripped" condition, only with outer skeleton. City estimated the value of the building at €5 million and attempted to sell it for the first time in 2014 for €4.9 million but no one was interested. Several other auctions were held, with decreasing price, but they all failed. In the spring of 2016, city lowered the price to €3.1 million, but that auction was postponed and in November 2016 it was announced that the Belgrade branch of the Stuttgart-based Stattwerk architecture firm purchased the edifice for €4,25 million.

In August 2017, Stattwerk has disclosed its plans for the building, saying that it will be the first energy-efficient skyscraper with green facades in Serbia with different commercial and tourist facilities. The official bid for the best project of the completely green building (just sun, wind and geothermal energy) was announced in October 2017, and the winning project was picked in December. The new, "green skyscraper", projected by architect Jovan Mitrović, will include the green façades, automated underground garage for 500 cars, photovoltaic panels, organic recycling and garden, greenhouse, etc. No dates on the construction were given. In December 2017, an artistic installation was placed inside the building. Stretching from top to the bottom for 12 floors, it consists of recycled green canvases which form a tree-like structure. Using decorative lights and natural winds, as the building is without windows, it mimics the real, green tree. It is named Biotop.

All these plans were pushed aside when it was announced in April 2021 that Stattwerk sold the building to Astoria Properties. They claimed the reconstruction will start in the summer of 2021 and that building will be ready for tenants in the spring of 2022. Apart from the central tower, there are two annexes to the building. Stattwerk never acquired them, while Astoria managed to acquire one, lifting the total floor area to 10,350 square metres (111,400 sq ft). However, the building permits were issued only in January 2023. The new building will be fully commercial, called Brankov Business Center ("Brankov BC"). Works began in February 2023, and the deadline is set for July 2024.
