= Zlatna Moruna =

Kafana in Belgrade, Serbia

Coordinates: 44°48′47″N 20°27′29″E

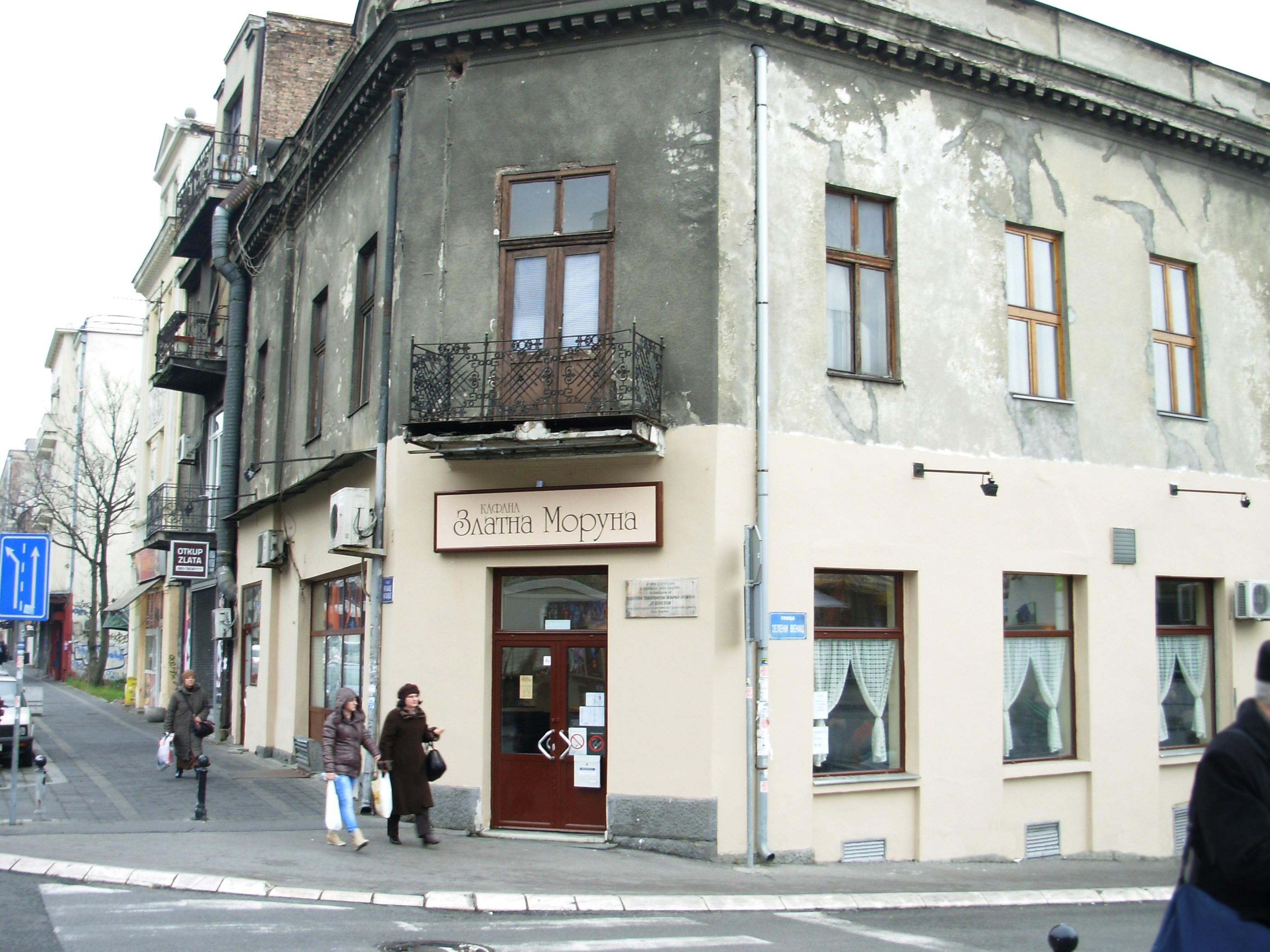
The tavern after the 2013 reconstruction

Zlatna Moruna or Golden Beluga (Serbian: Кафана "Златна моруна") is a kafana in Belgrade, the capital of Serbia. Today considered a "historical kafana", it was a gathering place and an unofficial base of the members of Young Bosnia revolutionary movement, prior to the 1914 Assassination of Archduke Franz Ferdinand of Austria, a prelude to World War I.

== Location ==
The kafana is located in the neighborhood of Zeleni Venac, in the municipality of Savski Venac. It is situated at the corner of Kraljice Natalije and Kamenička streets, just south of the Zeleni Venac Green Market at the foothills of the Terazije Terrace. The official address is 2 Kraljice Natalije Street.

== History ==
The two-storey building was constructed in the 1890s, in the historical quarter of Savamala, and a kafana was immediately opened on the ground level, which covers 239 m^{2} (2,570 sq ft). In front of the building was a fish market, part of the Zeleni Venac Green Market. Closest to the building was the location of the sellers which were selling the fish caught at Iron Gates, on the Danube, like wels catfish and beluga, or moruna, so the kafana was originally named Kod morune ("Beluga's"), which was later changed to Zlatna Moruna. The beluga was known for its great size and quality caviar. They migrated from the Black Sea up the Danube, but they are now prevented from swimming this far, after the Iron Gate I Hydroelectric Power Station was built in 1967–72.

The clientele consisted of workers, merchants, artisans, ferrymen and high-school students. In April 1906 a workers' singing union "Jedinstvo" was founded in the kafana, and commemorative plaque still marks the occasion. The mathematician Mihailo Petrović, whose passion for fishing earned him the nickname Mika Alas ("Mika the Fisherman"), spent a lot of time in Zlatna Moruna. He would bring the fish he caught to the market and then distribute them to the poor.

After World War I, the name of the kafana was changed to Triglav, and the venue kept that name for the next seven decades. The building was a property of the industrialist Đorđe Roš, a soldier at the Salonika front and a benefactor of the Hilandar monastery. The new Communist authorities nationalized the property after World War II, but when the process of restitution began in the 2010s, no one claimed it.

In 1992 the venue was leased by the Madera company. In November 2002 the change of purpose was authorized, so from catering it was switched to trade. In 2007 another change was allowed, this time to betting, so a betting shop, Meridijan, was opened. Even that was changed in 2010, when a Chinese store, Luo Vang Fa, replaced the betting shop. Madera asked for another change in 2013, and the original catering purpose was restored so that the venue could be restored to its pre-1914 look and purpose, commemorating World War I and the gathering of the members of Young Bosnia there. The work began in late 2013. The facility was equipped with memorabilia from the period, including many photos and the old billiard table, along with objects reminiscent of both Young Bosnia and Mika Alas. The restored kafana was opened in January 2014. Unfortunately, this attempt at historical preservation was rather short lived, as on April 27, 2018, a new business, Pocket Caffè & Billiards, opened where the kafana previously was.

=== Young Bosnia ===
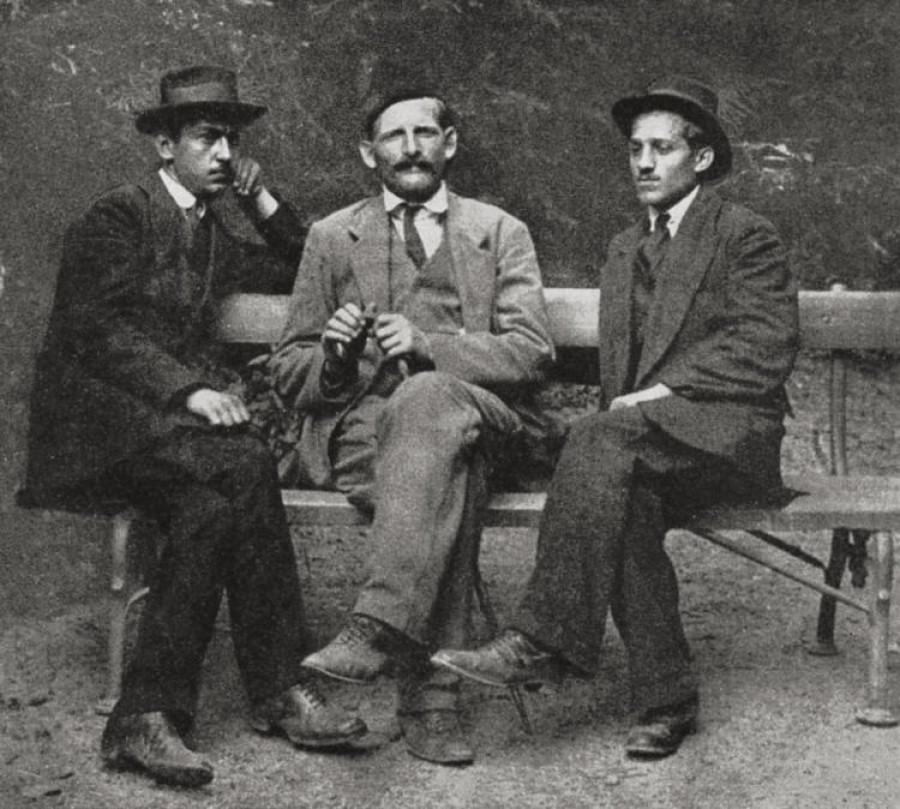
Trifko Grabež, Nedeljko Čabrinović and Gavrilo Princip in Kalemegdan, May 1914

As members of the movement lived as sub-tenants in the surrounding streets, Zlatna Moruna became their gathering place and an unofficial base. From Zlatna Moruna, Trifko Grabež, Nedeljko Čabrinović and Gavrilo Princip, who later assassinated the archduke, departed for Sarajevo. To the kafana's address was delivered a letter for Čabrinović with a newspaper clipping from Zagreb's Srbobran, giving details of the archduke's visit to Sarajevo. They often discussed their plans over the billiard table as they played karambol.

The Zlatna Moruna was also a location where the members of Young Bosnia met with the members of Black Hand, headed by Dragutin Dimitrijević Apis. Behind the building there was an inner yard, in which members of the Black Hand taught Princip how to shoot. In the 1980s, on one part of that lot a post office was built while the remaining part was covered in undergrowth and had become almost inaccessible by the 2010s.

Among the revisionist theories concerning the events which resulted in World War I was one that Princip was an agent of some government, which paid him to kill the archduke. However, his surviving correspondence shows that his financial situation was dire. In one letter he pleads to his landlady not to throw him out of his room even though he owes her 16 dinars. In another letter he admits that, due to the problems with paying the rent, he slept for three nights in the open, in the market in front of the kafana.

Though the claim that the idea of the assassination itself was conceived in Zlatna Moruna may or may not be true, the historiography can't confirm it.
