= Kafana =

Type of bistro or tavern in former Yugoslav countries

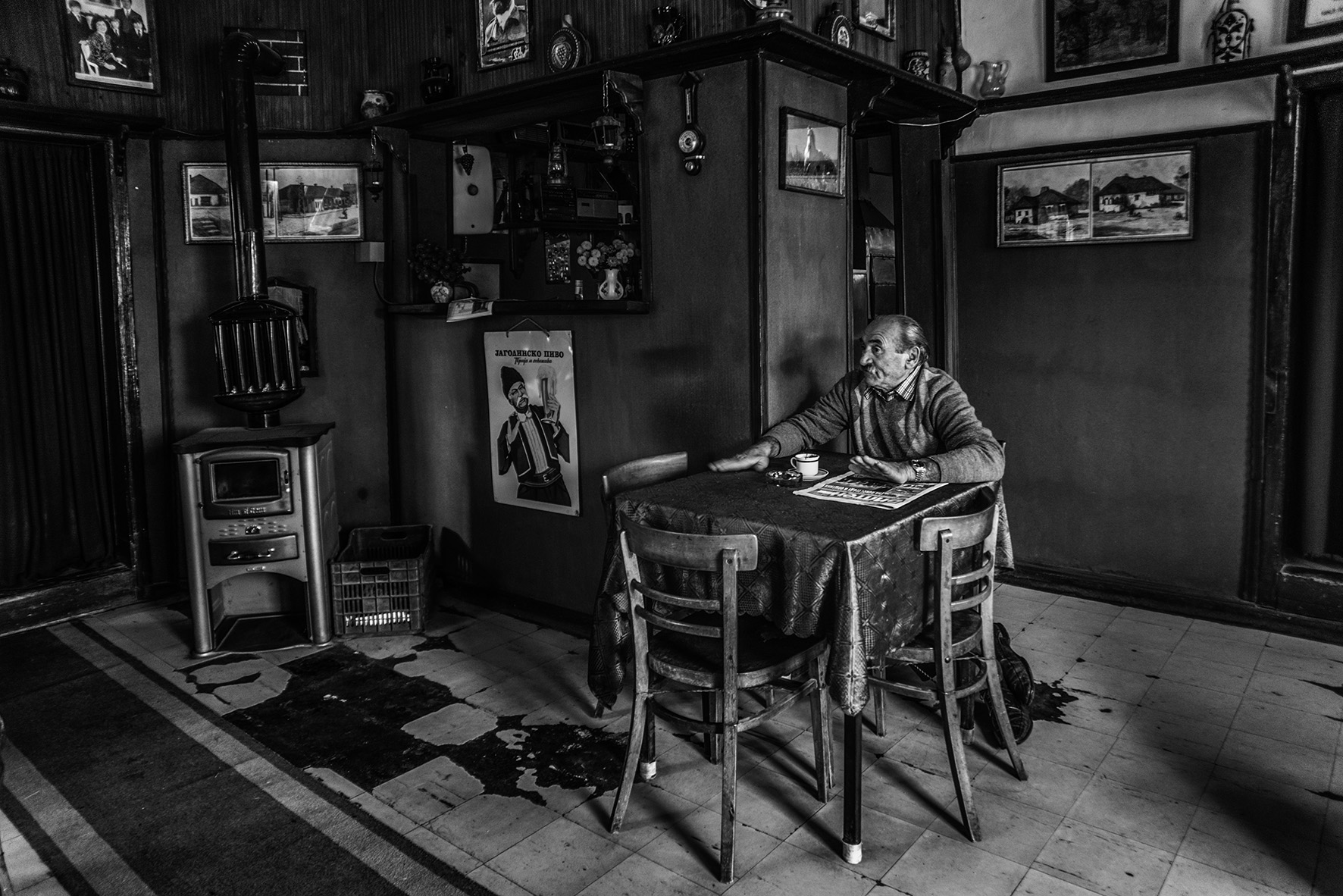
Traditional interior view of a kafana

Kafana (Serbo-Croatian Cyrillic: кафана, кафене (kafene), καφενείο (kafenío), cafenea, kávéház, or kavarna, is a type of local coffeehouse, bistro or tavern, found in the countries of the Balkans or Southeastern Europe, especially those of the former Yugoslavia. They originally served coffee and other warm drinks, while today usually also offer alcoholic beverages and food. Many kafanas feature live music performances or themed nights.

The concept of a social gathering place for men to drink alcoholic beverages and coffee originated contemporaneously in Europe and Western Asia. It became popular in the Ottoman Empire and spread to Southeast Europe during Ottoman rule, further evolving into the contemporary kafana.

== Nomenclature and etymology ==
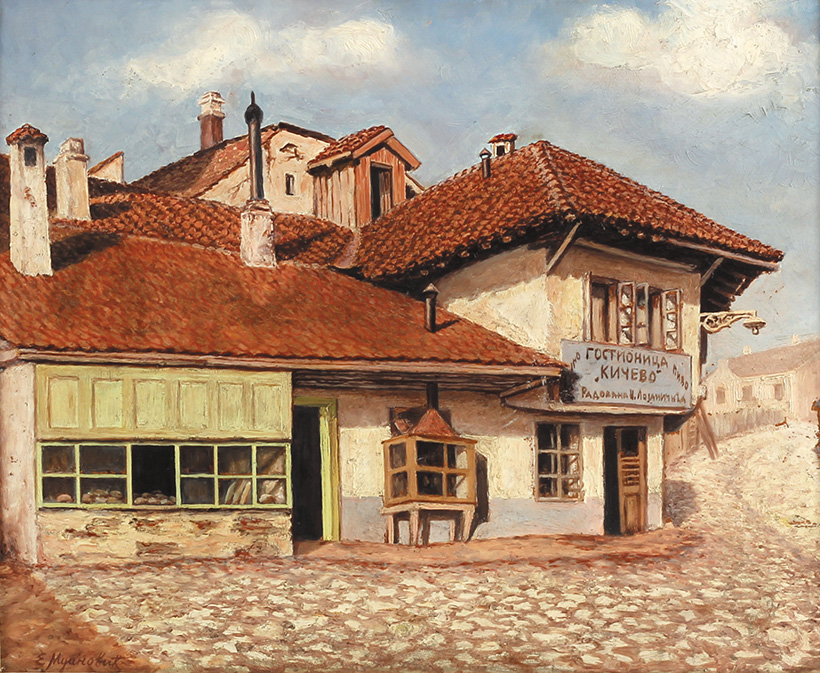
Painting of a kafana in Belgrade, 1925

This distinct type of establishment is known by several slightly differing names depending on country and language:

- Albanian: kafene, pl. kafene
- Bulgarian: кафене (kafene), pl. кафенета (kafeneta)
- Serbo-Croatian: kafana / кафана or kavana / кавана, pl. kafane / кафане or kavane / каване
  - Bosnian: kafana (pronounced [kafǎna]) or kahvana (pronounced [kahʋǎna]), pl. kafane or kahvane
  - Croatian: kavana (pronounced [kaʋǎna]), pl. kavane
  - Serbian: кафана / kafana (pronounced [kafǎna]), pl. кафане / kafane
- Greek: καφενείο (kafeneío) or καφενέ (kafené), pl. καφενεία (kafeneía)
- Hungarian: kávéház, pl. kávéházak
- Macedonian: кафеана (kafeana), pl. кафеани (kafeani)
- Romanian: cafenea, pl. cafenele
- Slovene: kavarna, pl. kavarne

The word itself, irrespective of regional differences, is derived from the Turkish kahvehane 'coffeehouse', which is in turn derived from the Persian term qahveh-khaneh (a compound of the Arabic qahve 'coffee' and Persian khane 'house').

In Macedonia, kafeana is sometimes confused with the more traditional meana, while the variant kafana (adopted from commercial Serbian folk songs and popularized by domestic artists) may be used for the establishment described in this article; however, both terms are used interchangeably by some.

The Slovenian kavarna shares neither its etymology nor its functionality with the Ottoman kahvehane, deriving instead from the coffeehouses of Vienna and thus not offering its guests alcoholic beverages or entertainment in the form of folk music. The term 'kavarna' is of Slovenian origin, like related Slovene terms for shopping or drinking venues such as 'pekarna' (bakery) and 'gostilna' (tavern).

Nowadays in Serbia, the term kafana is similarly used to describe any informal eatery serving traditional cuisine, as well as some other classical kafana dishes like Karađorđeva.

== History ==
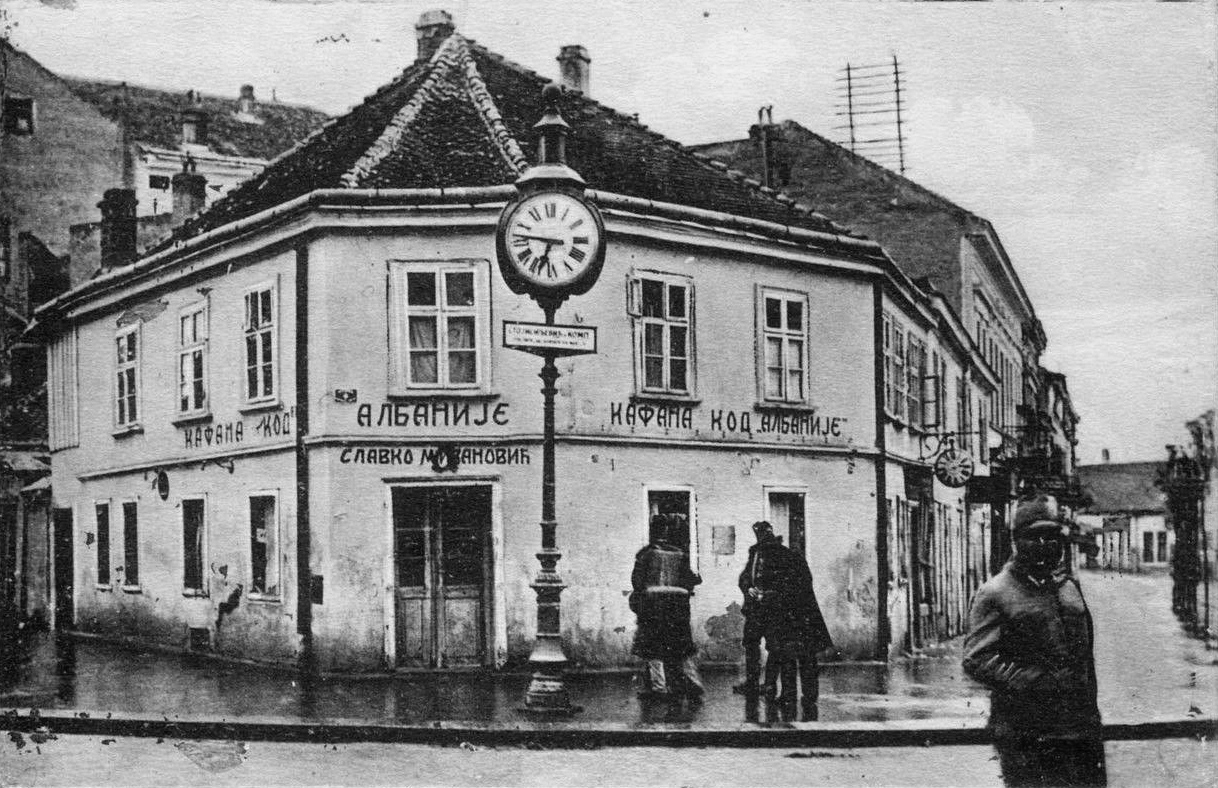
Kafana at Palace Albania, Belgrade, 1910s

The first coffeehouses in the area appeared during the Ottoman expansion in the 16th century, popping up in Belgrade, Buda, Sarajevo and other cities under Ottoman control. Further west, in Zagreb, the first coffee-serving establishments were recorded in 1636. In these kavotočja or Kaffeebuden, coffee and snacks were sold and consumed in a vehicle similar to a circus wagon. The first known modern-day kavana in Zagreb was opened in 1749, and the institution was commonplace in Zagreb and many other Croatian cities by the end of the 18th century. By the 19th century, a distinction arose between the kavane, which were high-society establishments, and the working-class kavotočja.

During the 18th and early 19th century, running a kafana was a family business, a craft, passed on from generation to generation.

As the Balkan cities grew in size and became more urbanized, the kafana changed their business model. Some started serving food and offering other incentives to potential customers to compete with rival establishments. Most bigger towns and cities in this period had a Gradska kafana (City kafana) located in or around the main square where the most affluent and important people in the city would come to see and be seen. Prices in this type of kafana would usually be higher than those charged in establishments without such an exclusive location.

The concept of live music was introduced in the early 20th century by kafana owners looking to offer different kinds of entertainment to their guests. In the absence of mass media these bands had a strictly local character and would only play the folk music that was popular in that region.

Later in the 20th, the population of cities in the Balkans further increased due to the arrival of migrants from rural areas, especially after World War II, and kafane diversified accordingly. Some continued to uphold a high standard of service, while others began to cater to the newly arrived rural population that mostly found employment in factories and on construction sites.

During this time the term kafana slowly began to be associated with something undesirable and suitable only for the lower classes of society. By the 1980s, term kafana became almost an insult and most owners would steer clear of calling their places by that name, instead preferring westernized terms such as restaurant, cafe, bistro, and coffee bar. The terms birtija, bircuz and krčma are also used to stereotype rural or suburban kafane, usually filthy.

== The stereotype ==
During the 1960s, in contrast to the state-sponsored Partisan films, Yugoslav movies of the Black Wave movement started depicting contemporary individuals from the margins of society. Run-down kafane would feature prominently in such stories. Socially relevant films like I Even Met Happy Gypsies, When Father Was Away on Business, Život je lep, Do You Remember Dolly Bell?, Specijalno vaspitanje, Kuduz, etc. all had memorable, dramatic scenes that take place in dilapidated rural or suburban kafana. Soon, a distinct cinematic stereotype appeared.

In Mate Bulić's album Gori borovina, there is a song "Ej, kavano", which describes the common stereotype of the kafana.

=== Social stereotype ===
Kafana is stereotyped as a place where sad lovers cure their sorrows in alcohol and music, gamblers squander entire fortunes, husbands run away from mean wives while shady businessmen, corrupt local politicians and petty criminals do business. As in many other societies, frequenting kafane is seen as a mainly male activity, and "honest" women dare only visit finer ones, usually in the company of men.

As mentioned, it is a very frequent motif of late-20th century commercial folk songs, perhaps the most famous being "I tebe sam sit kafano" (I'm Sick of You, too, Kafana) by Haris Džinović, "Kafana je moja sudbina" (Kafana Is My Destiny) by Toma Zdravković, and the ubiquitous "Čaše lomim" (I'm Breaking Glasses), originally by Nezir Eminovski.

== By country ==
=== Albania ===
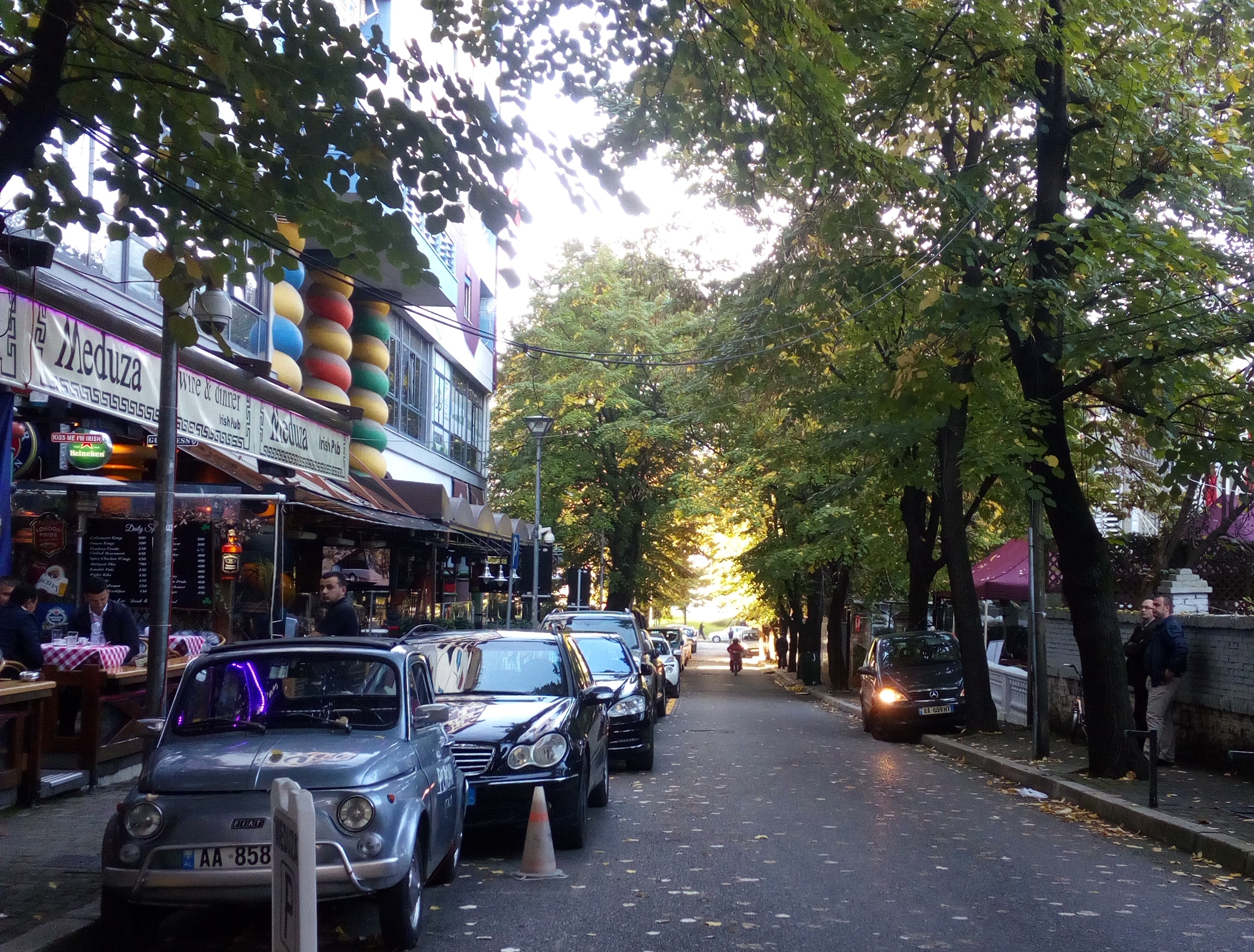
Cafes along Mustafa Matohiti St near Blloku district in central Tirana

In 2016, Albania surpassed Spain by becoming the country with the most coffee houses per capita in the world. In fact, there are 654 coffee houses per 100,000 inhabitants in Albania, a country with only 2.5 million inhabitants. This is due to coffee houses closing down in Spain due to the economic crisis, and the fact that as many cafes open as they close in Albania. In addition, the fact that it was one of the easiest ways to make a living after the fall of communism in Albania, together with the country's Ottoman legacy further reinforce the strong dominance of coffee culture in Albania.

=== Bosnia and Herzegovina ===
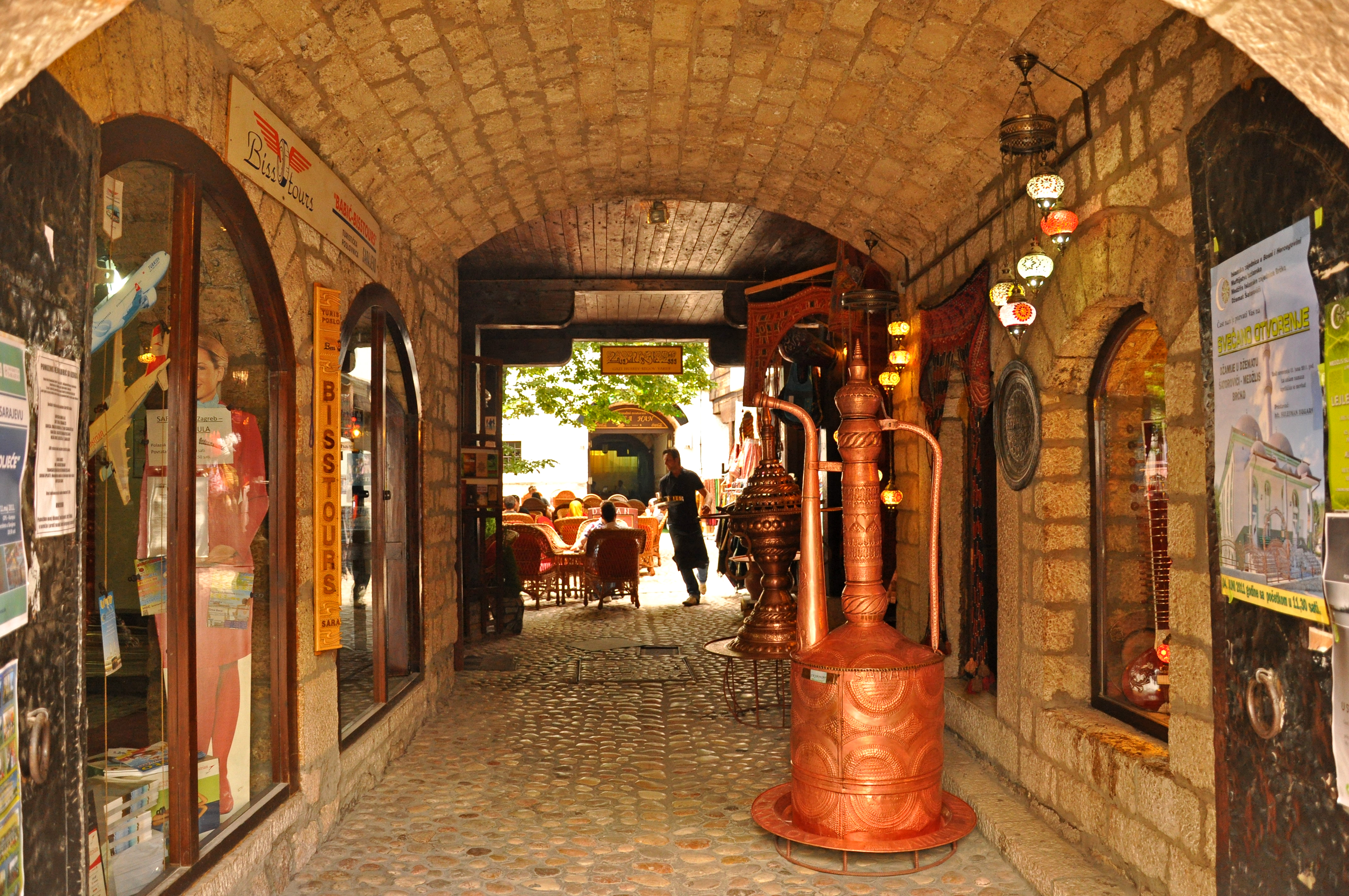
Cafe Bosnian way – Morića Han in the heart of the Baščaršija, Sarajevo old quarter

Probably the purest form of kafana can be found in Bosnia where no food is served (differentiating kafana from ćevabdžinica, aščinica and buregdžinica), staying true to the original Turkish coffee and alcohol concept.

In Bosnian cities with large Muslim populations, one can still find certain old kafane that probably didn't look much different back when the Ottomans ruled Bosnia. They are now mostly frequented by local elders as well as the occasional tourist, and their numbers are dwindling.

Most of the old centerpiece Gradske Kafane have been visually modernized and had their names changed in the process to something snappy and western-sounding. Most other establishments that offer similar fare target a younger crowd and prefer not to use the term kafana. However, stereotypical kafanas hold some popularity amongst high-schoolers and students, as well as working-class men, who frequent them as places to binge drink due to their affordable prices.

=== Croatia ===
In Croatia, the term for kafana is kavana (as coffee is spelled kava in Croatian) and they differ widely between continental Croatia and the Dalmatian coast. Kafić (pl. kafići) is a more general term encompassing all establishments serving coffee and alcohol drinks only, while kavana is the name for distinctly styled bistros described in this article.

=== Hungary ===
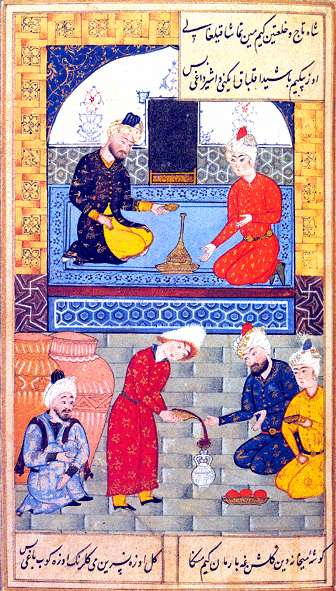
A kávéház (Turkish: kahvehane) in Ottoman Hungary

Korzó Kávéház in Kiskőrös

A kávéház (Turkish: kahvehane) was opened in Nándorfehérvár (present-day Belgrade, Serbia) in 1521, shortly after the city fell to the Ottomans. A coffeehouse opposite the Büyük Müezzin Sinan Pasha Mosque (today the Matthias Church) in Buda was recorded in 1578. The earliest known Hungarian reference to a Serbian-established coffeehouse in Hungary dates back to 1696 in Szentendre. The first known Serbian-established coffeehouse in Pest dates back to 1714 (Balázs Kávéfőző).

The traditional Hungarian kávéház primarily functions as a social spot, where people may hold meetings and play games, such as card games or chess. They typically serve coffee, light food such as pogácsa, toasted sandwiches and pastries, and alcoholic beverages, but it is socially unacceptable to be intoxicated there. They are relatively uncommon in Budapest, where Viennese-style coffeehouses take precedent.

=== North Macedonia ===
Currently, there are 5,206 kafeani in the country. According to the State Statistical Office, there are 989 kafeani (19% of the total number) in the capital Skopje, 413 in Tetovo, 257 in Bitola, 244 in Gostivar, 206 in Kumanovo, 205 in Struga, 188 in Ohrid and 161 in Strumica.

=== Serbia ===
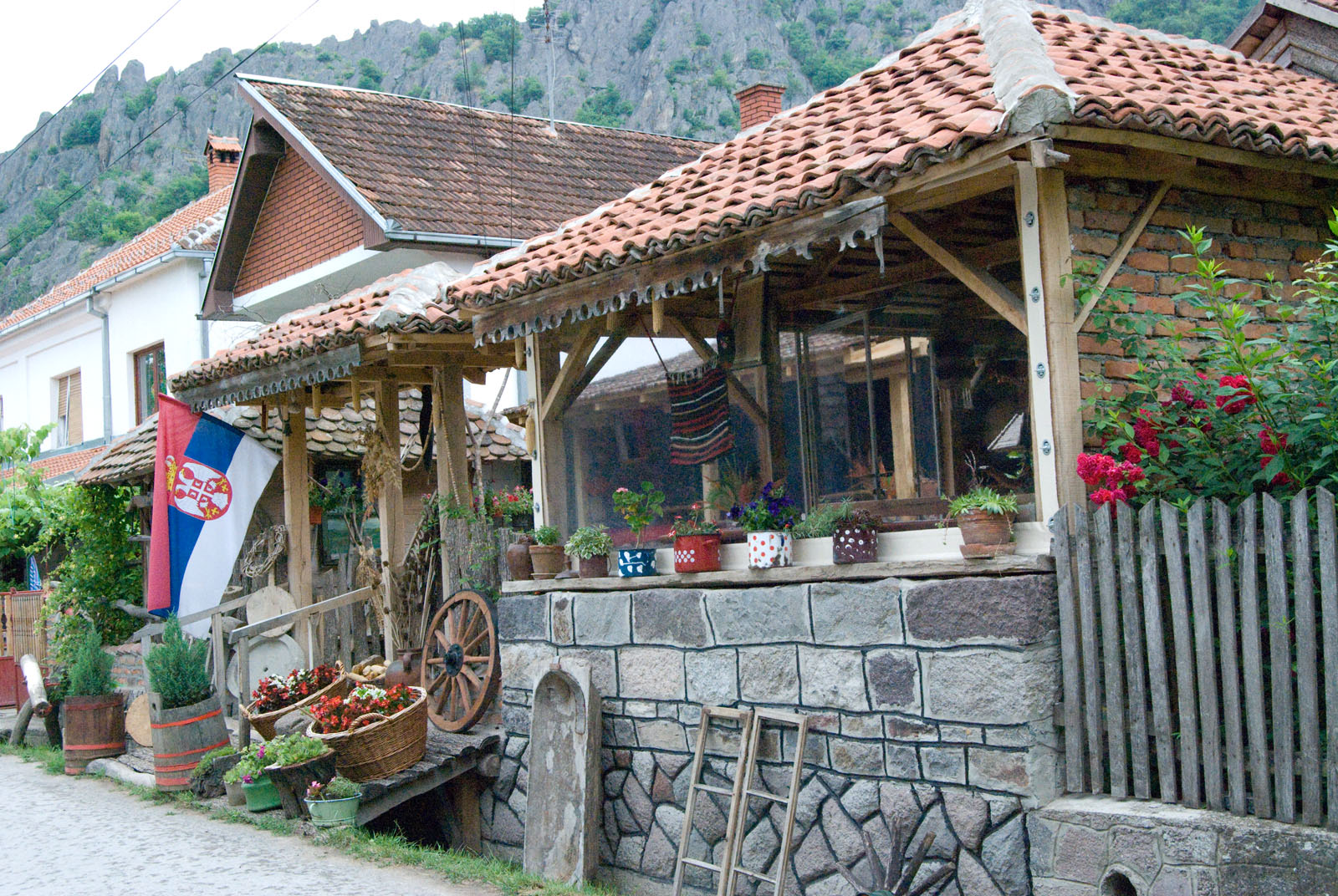
A village kafana in Borač, Šumadija District, Serbia.

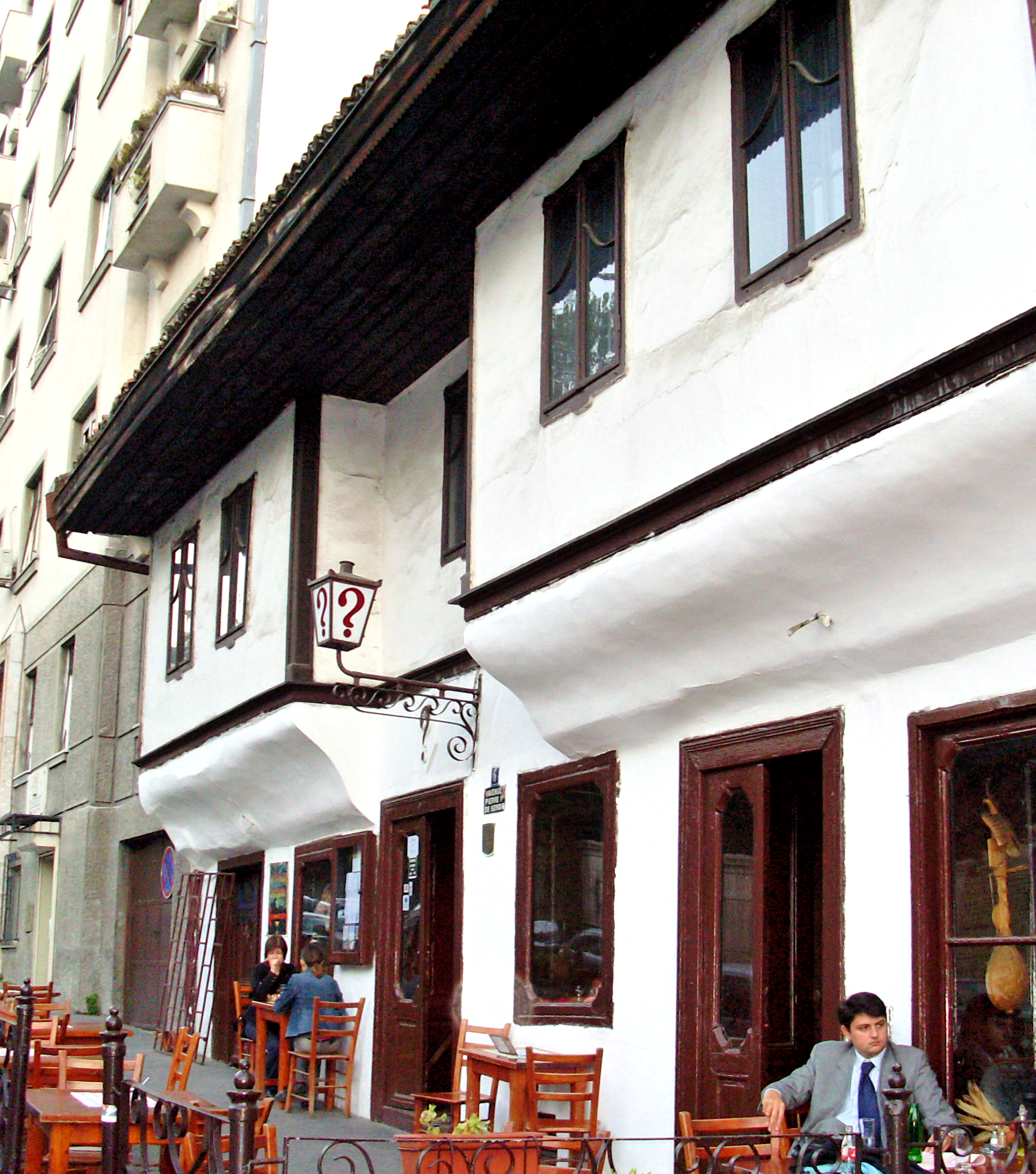
Famous kafana "?" in downtown Belgrade

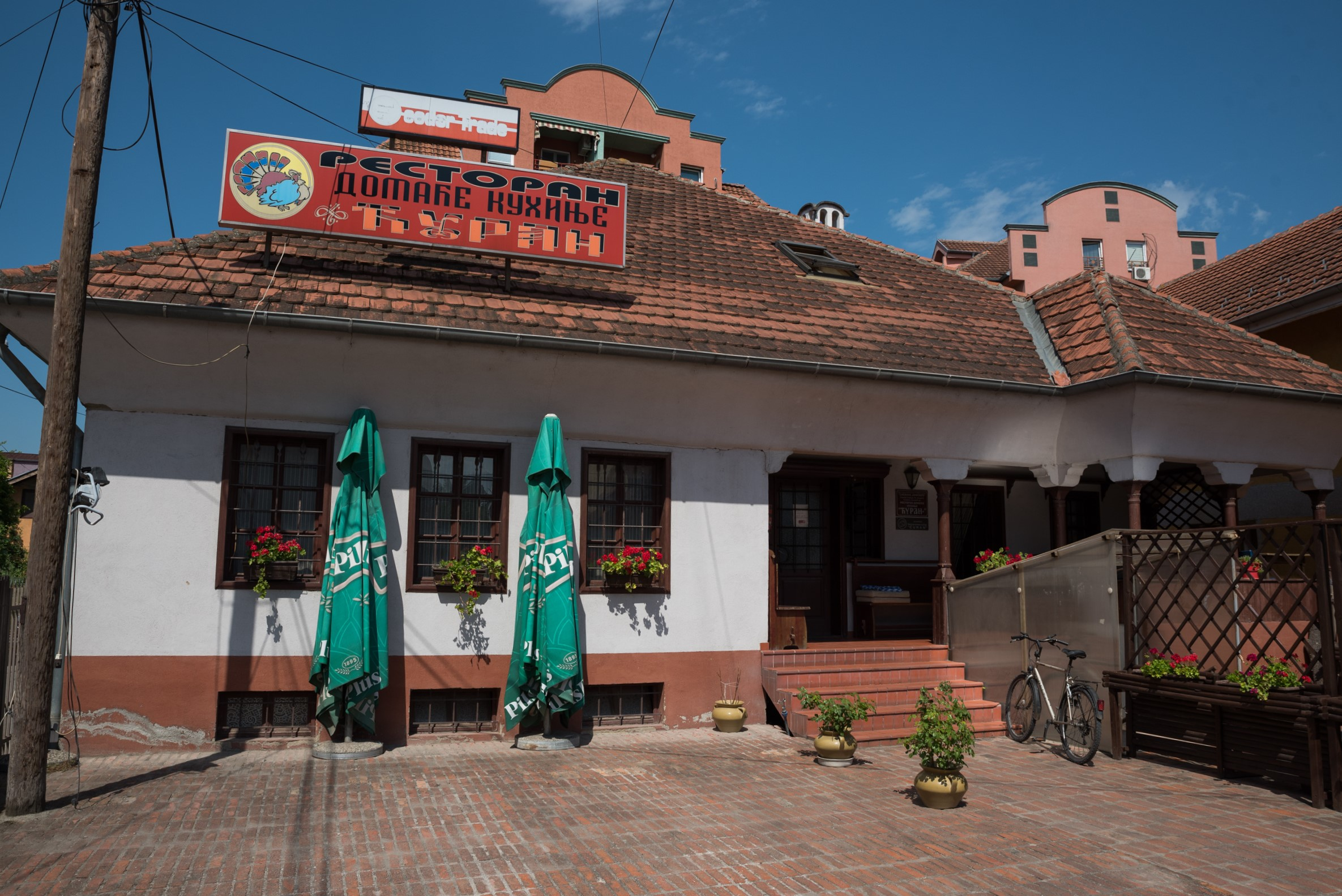
Kafana in an Old house in Jagodina

The City of Belgrade features many establishments equipped with extensive kitchens serving elaborate menus that are officially called restaurants yet most patrons refer to them as kafane.

According to some, the first kafana in Belgrade opened sometime after 1738, when the Ottomans recaptured the city from the Austrians. Its name was Crni orao (Black Eagle) and it was located in Dorćol neighbourhood, at the intersection of today's Kralja Petra and Dušanova streets. Its patrons were only served Turkish black coffee poured from silver ibrik into a fildžan as well as nargile.

The concept of eating in Serbian kafane was introduced in the 19th century when the menu consisted mostly of simply snacks, such as ćevapčići. The menus soon expanded as food became large part of the appeal of Belgrade kafane that originated in the 19th and early 20th century like the famous ″?″ (transl. Question Mark), Lipov lad (transl. The Linden Tree's Shade, opened in 1928), and Tri lista duvana (transl. Three Tobacco Leaves), as well as Skadarlija bohemian spots Tri šešira (transl. Three Hats), Dva bela goluba (transl. Two White Doves), Šešir moj (transl. Hat of Mine), Dva jelena (transl. Two Deer), Zlatni bokal (transl. The Golden Pitcher), and Ima dana (transl. There are Days). Another kafana that gained notoriety during the early 20th century was Zlatna moruna (transl. The Golden Beluga) at the Zeleni Venac neighbourhood where Young Bosnia conspirators frequently gathered while plotting the June 1914 assassination of Austro-Hungarian archduke Franz Ferdinand. Certain kafane had their names preserved through the structures that succeeded them in the same location; Palace Albanija, built in 1940 in central Belgrade got its name from the kafana that used to be there from 1860 until 1936.

Post World War II period gave a rise in popularity to kafane like Šumatovac, Pod lipom (transl. Under the Linden Tree), and Grmeč in Makedonska Street (nicknamed the 'Bermuda triangle'), Manjež, as well as later establishments like Madera, Kod Ive (transl. Ivo's), and Klub književnika (transl. The Writers' Club).

== See also ==
- Coffeehouse
- Kafenio, the Greek equivalent
- Coffee culture in the former Yugoslavia
