= Kafenio =

Greek café

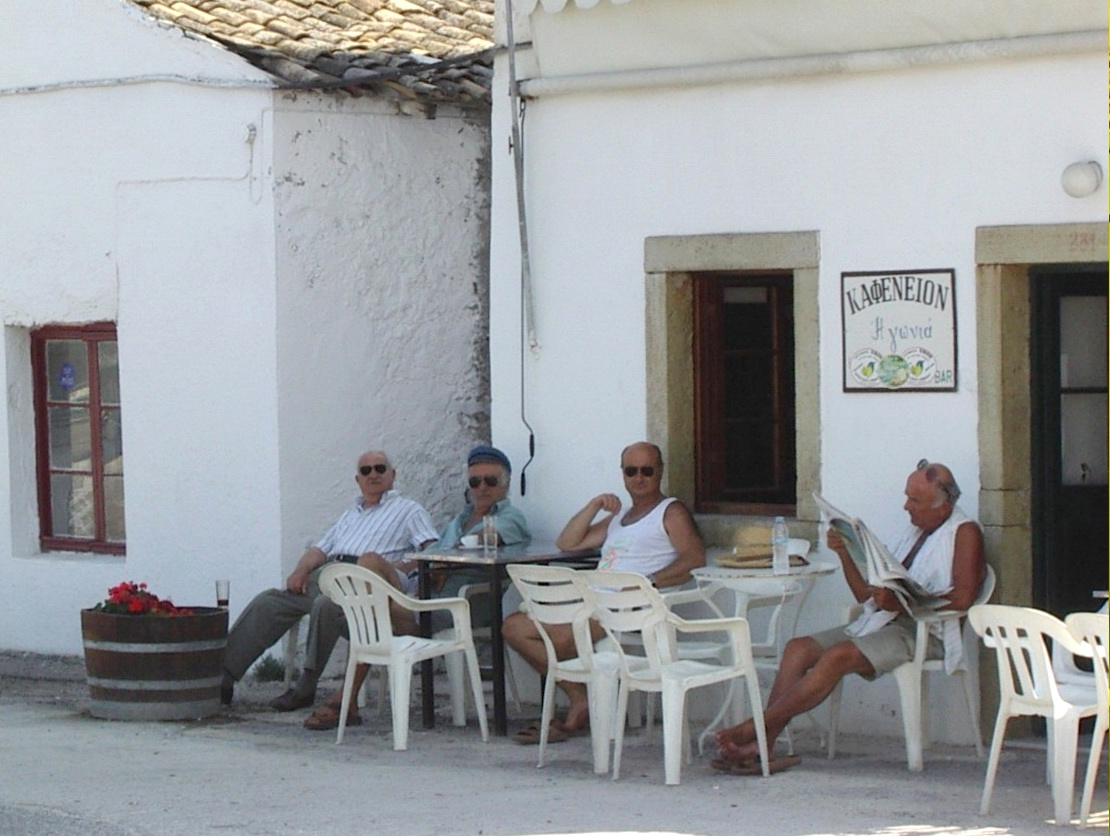
Kafenio in Gaios, 2006

A kafenio (Greek καφενεíο(ν), also rendered as cafenio, cafeneon; plural kafenia) is a Greek café.

A kafenio typically serves various types of Greek coffee, including Greek coffee and frappé, as well as beer, retsina, and ouzo. Most kafenia provide meze or free snacks and rarely serve full meals. Kafenia were traditionally family-run businesses and furnished simply. The walls are often whitewashed. Kafenia often serve as social centers of the villages and islands where they are located. People socialize after work or play a game of cards. In previous centuries, the kafenio was a place where women were not welcome but now kafenia are frequented by girls and women.

== Etymology ==
The word comes from earlier Greek καφενές, which is borrowed from Turkish kahvehane or kahvene ("coffeehouse"), in turn derived from the Persian qahveh-khaneh (< Arabic qahve 'coffee' + Persian khane 'house'). Other Balkan languages have also borrowed the Turkish term, as kafana, kavane, kaveana, etc.

== See also ==
- Coffee shop
