= ? (bistro) =

Tavern in Belgrade, Serbia

Coordinates: 44.817734°N 20.452450°E

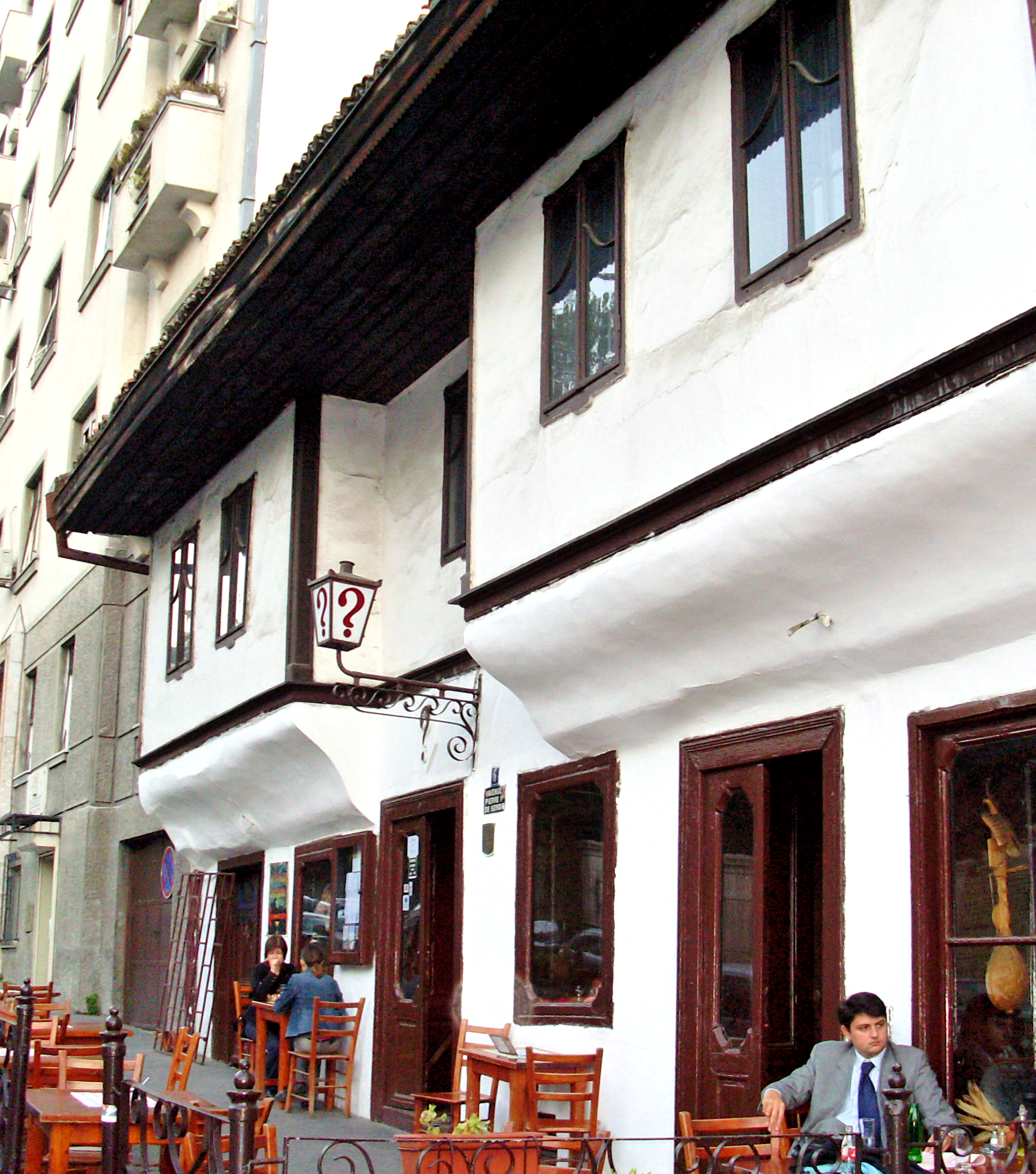
The "?" tavern on King Peter Street in December 2006

"?" (Serbian Cyrillic: Кафана „?”, Кафана „Знак питања”, Кафана „Упитник”; Serbian: Kafana „?”, Kafana „Znak pitanja”, Kafana „Upitnik”) is the oldest, still operational traditional tavern (kafana) in Belgrade, Serbia. Located at 6 Kralja Petra Street, the building is nearly 200 years old. One of the city's best known landmarks, "?" offers traditional Balkan cuisine accompanied by starogradska music.

== History ==
=== 19th century ===
The building in which the kafana is located, was built in 1823. It was built by the diplomat and merchant Naum Ičko, on orders and with funds provided by the Prince of Serbia, Miloš Obrenović I. Ičko was the son of Petar Ičko, a noted diplomat. It was designed by an unnamed Greek architect and was built by the builders from Greece, which is commemorated by the inscription on the wall above the preserved, old table from this period. Later Prince Miloš awarded the building to his personal doctor, Toma Kostić, known as Ećim Toma, for his efforts during the Second Serbian Uprising. Realizing its favourable location, Ećim Toma soon converted the property into a hospitality establishment that became known around town as Tomina kafana, "Ećim Toma's kafana". During early 1830s, the kafana was frequented by Serbian linguist and language reformer Vuk Stefanović Karadžić.

It was also named "Serbian kafana" and in 1878, the name was changed to Kod pastira ("Shepherd's"). It got its present unusual name in 1892, during a dispute with the Serbian Orthodox Church authorities over the new owner Ivan Pavlović's intention to change its name to Kod Saborne crkve (By the Cathedral Church), which the church authorities vehemently protested, not keen on seeing the cathedral referenced as part of a kafana's name. So, as a temporary solution, the tavern's owner put a question mark on the door, and it soon became the official name of the place. For a while, out of respect for the nearby church, smoking was prohibited inside the tavern, but this did not last.

=== 20th century ===
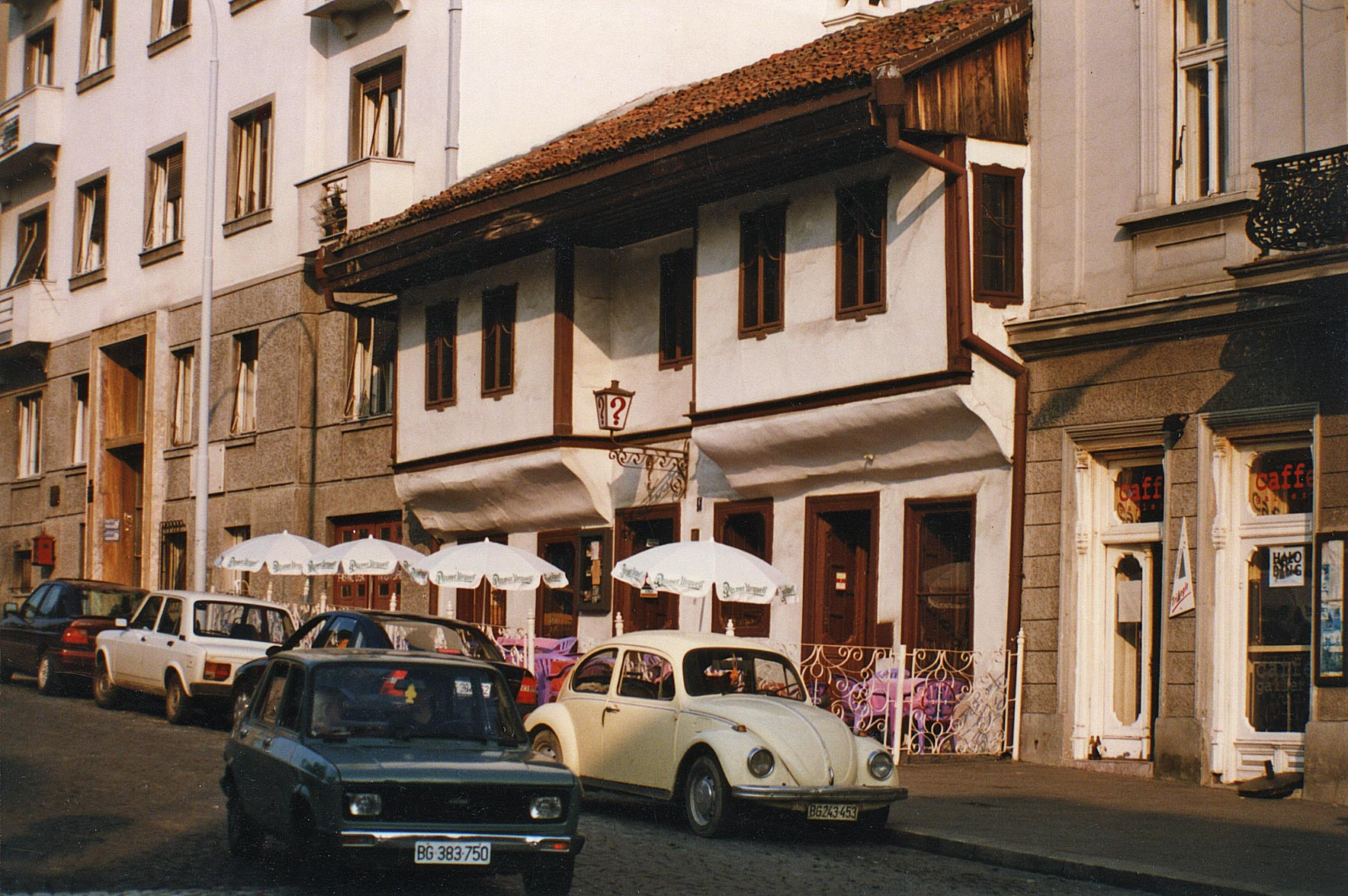
Bistro as it was in 1996

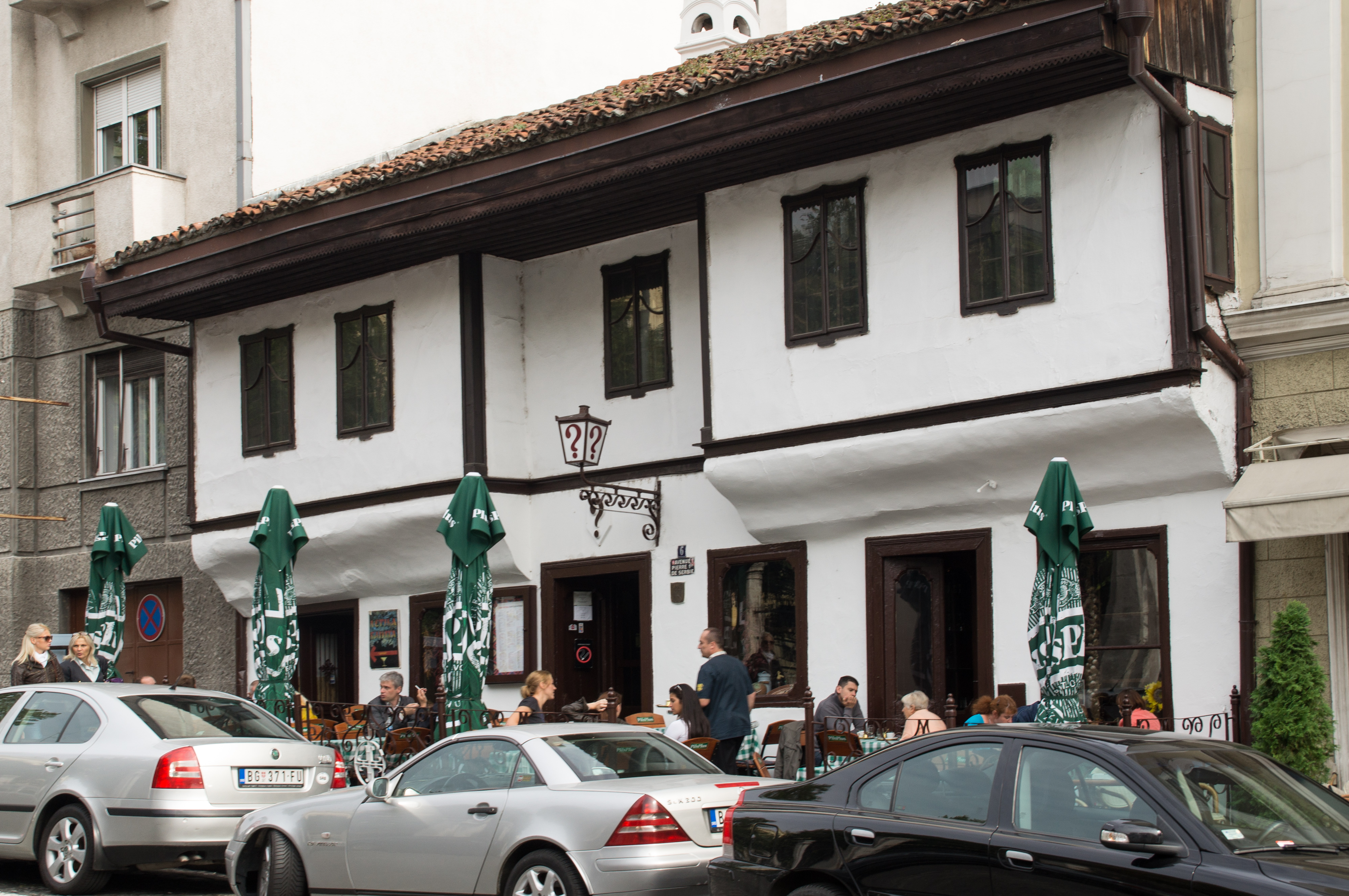

In the post-World War II period, the bistro was still owned by Ivan Pavlović, but communist Yugoslav authorities nationalized the property in 1959, ultimately placing it under the administration of the state owned company UTP Varoš Kapija in 1962. Sometime during the next thirty years it was declared a heritage location and given landmark protection by the City of Belgrade's Landmark Office (Zavod za zaštitu spomenika grada Beograda).

"?" was added to the Protected Monuments of Culture list by the Republic of Serbia in 1981.

=== 21st century ===
Talk of re-privatizing the previously nationalized property first started in 2003. Then the tender auction of UTP Varoš Kapija, which administered tavern "?" was scheduled for 25 November 2004. The starting value of the property was set at €2,500 per square meter. Ultimately, the tender was annulled as the building, in which the restaurant is located, is protected by the state since 1946 and, as such, cannot become a private property.

Strong resistance from the tavern's employees, from various public figures (mostly journalists who frequented the bistro), and from some civil groups, paid off in February 2007 when the Government of Serbia decided to exempt the restaurant from the privatization process and signed it over to city administration as a heritage location. A petition, signed by 2,563 people, called for the privatization to be stopped.

In May 2017, the Serbian Ministry of Finance confirmed the earlier Agency for Restitution's decision to award the ownership of "?" to the descendants of Ivan Pavlovic, the property's owner from 1892 until 1959 when the property was nationalized. One of the descendants said that they do not plan to change the purpose of the building but that he cannot guarantee that none of them will decide otherwise. The Company Varoš Kapija also said that several celebrities and artists wanted to take the kafana from them, either claiming they are the descendants of the original owners or wishing to buy the venue. The company filed a complaint asking for the annulment of the decision, claiming it has legally paid for the premises, partially to the state and partially to the descendants. In July 2019 the Administrative Court rejected the complaint, thus making the decision of restitution to the previous owners final. Initially, the owners refused to disclose what would happen with the venue.

== Exterior ==
The house was built in a Balkan style by Greek builders. It was constructed with an asymmetric interior and two bay windows on the main façade. It has a basement, ground floor and upper storey. It has a frontage onto the street and the site includes a garden and a yard. The basement is built from bricks and consists of two massive vaults. The ground floor is arranged asymmetrically, consisting of three chambers. The upper storey has six chambers. The arrangement of the rooms has remained unchanged despite later partitioning work carried out on the ground floor.

== Gallery ==
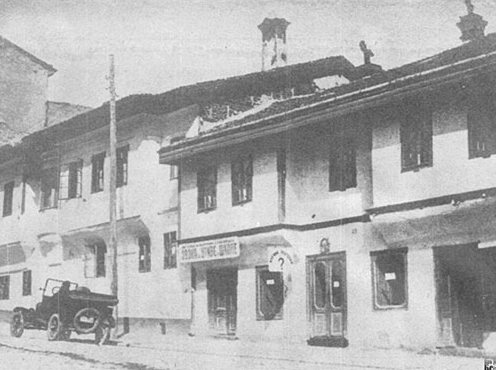
Tavern "?" between 1900 and 1940

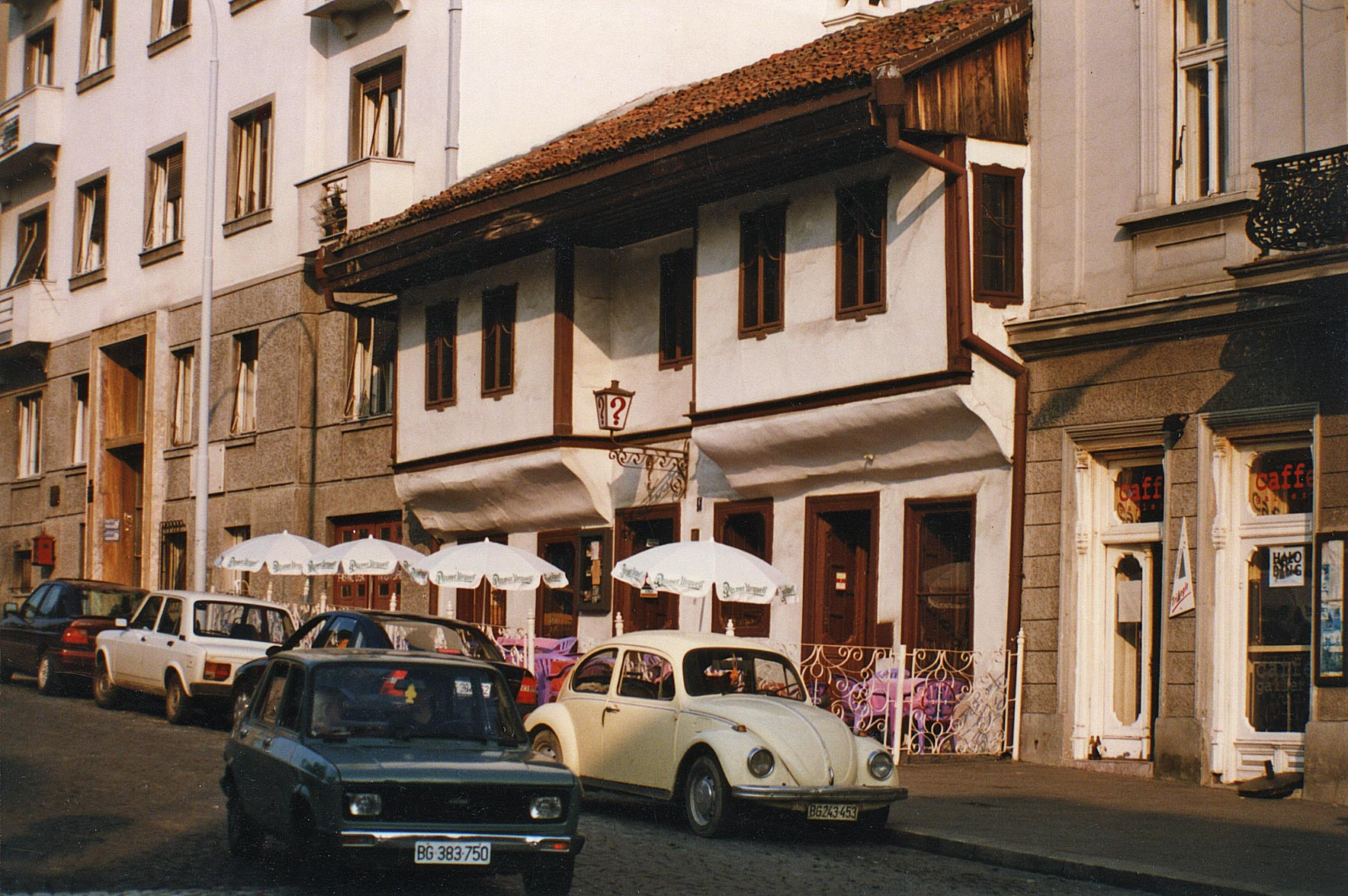
Tavern "?" 1996

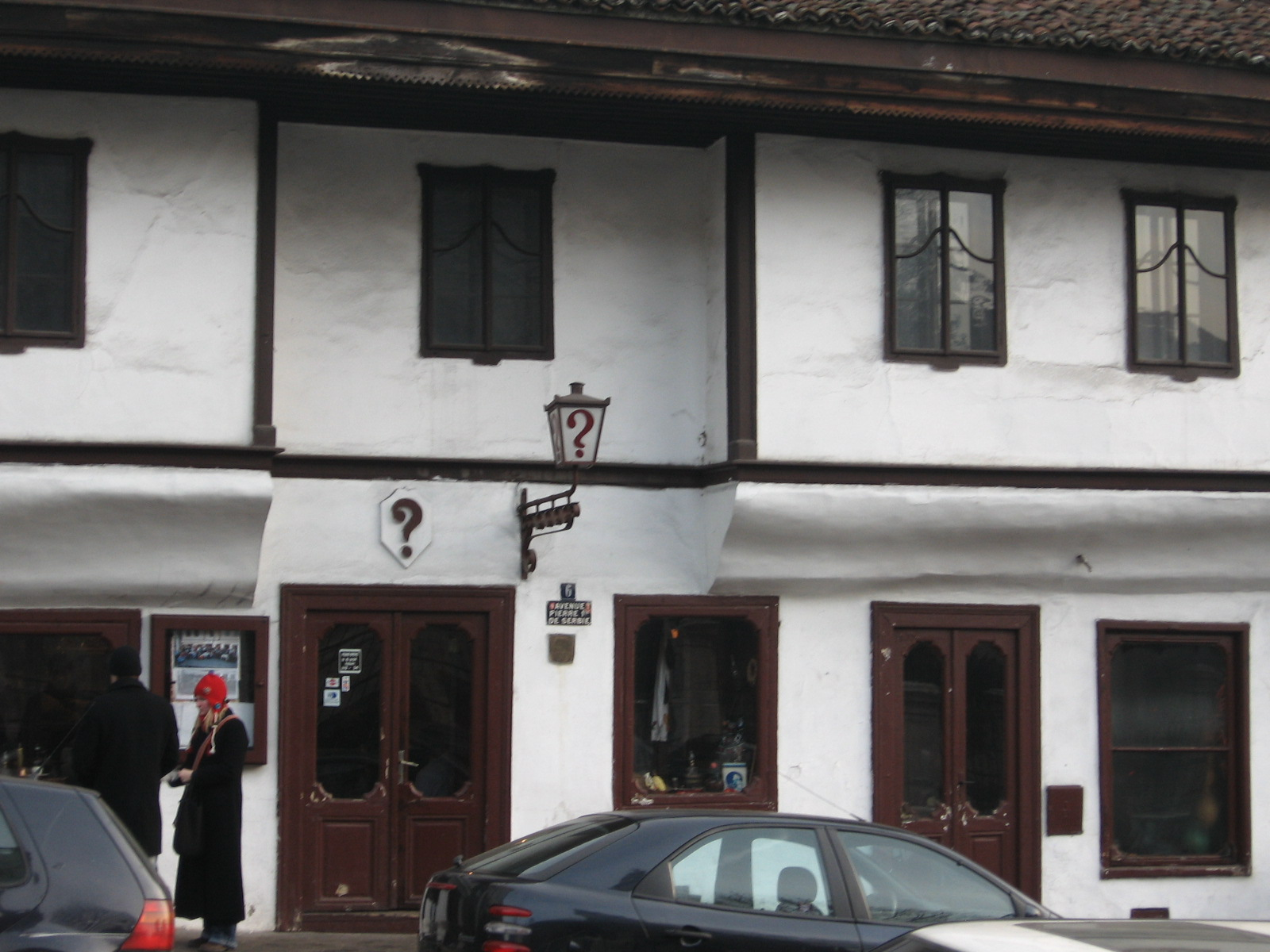
Tavern "?" December 2006

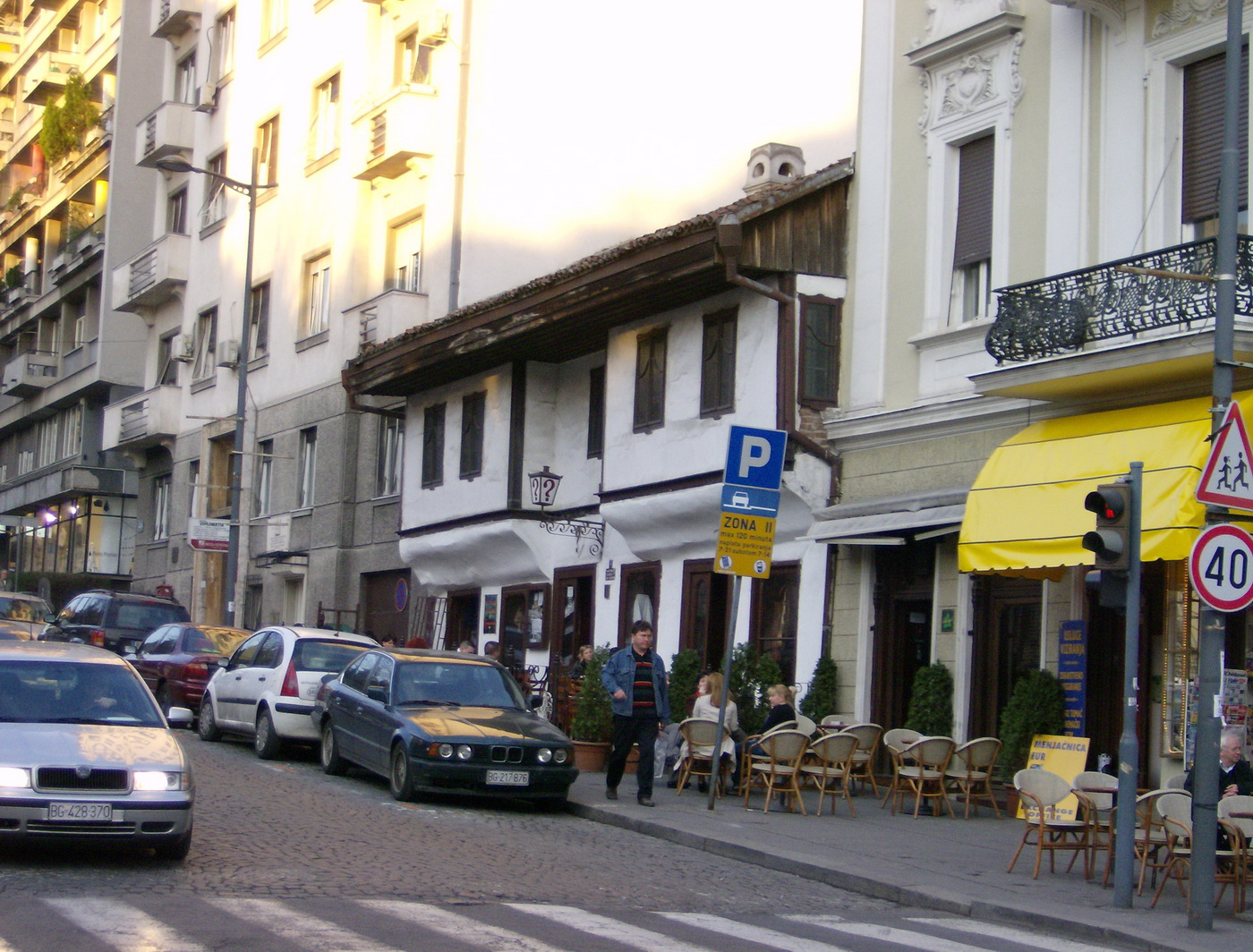
Tavern "?" January 2010

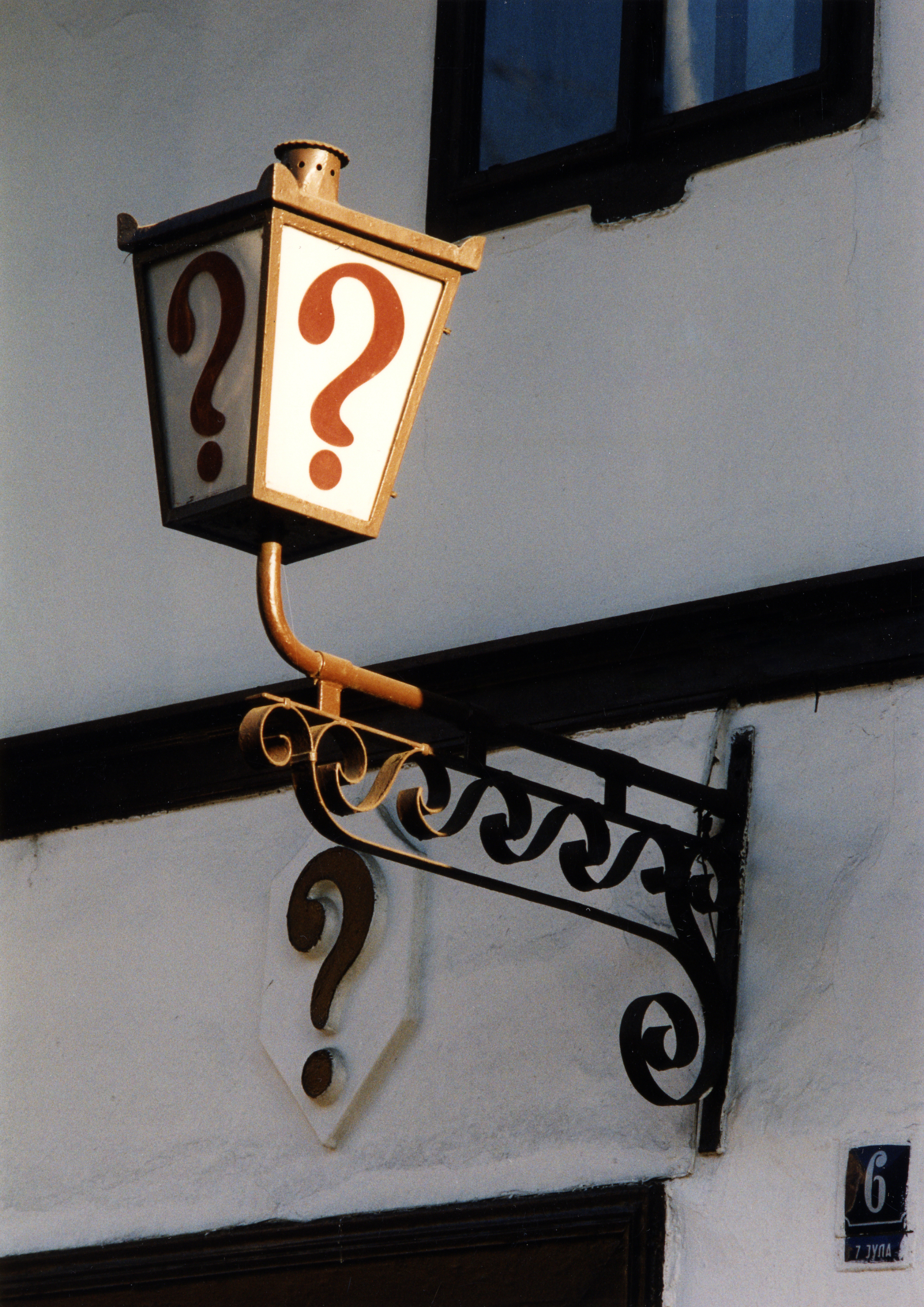
Tavern "?"

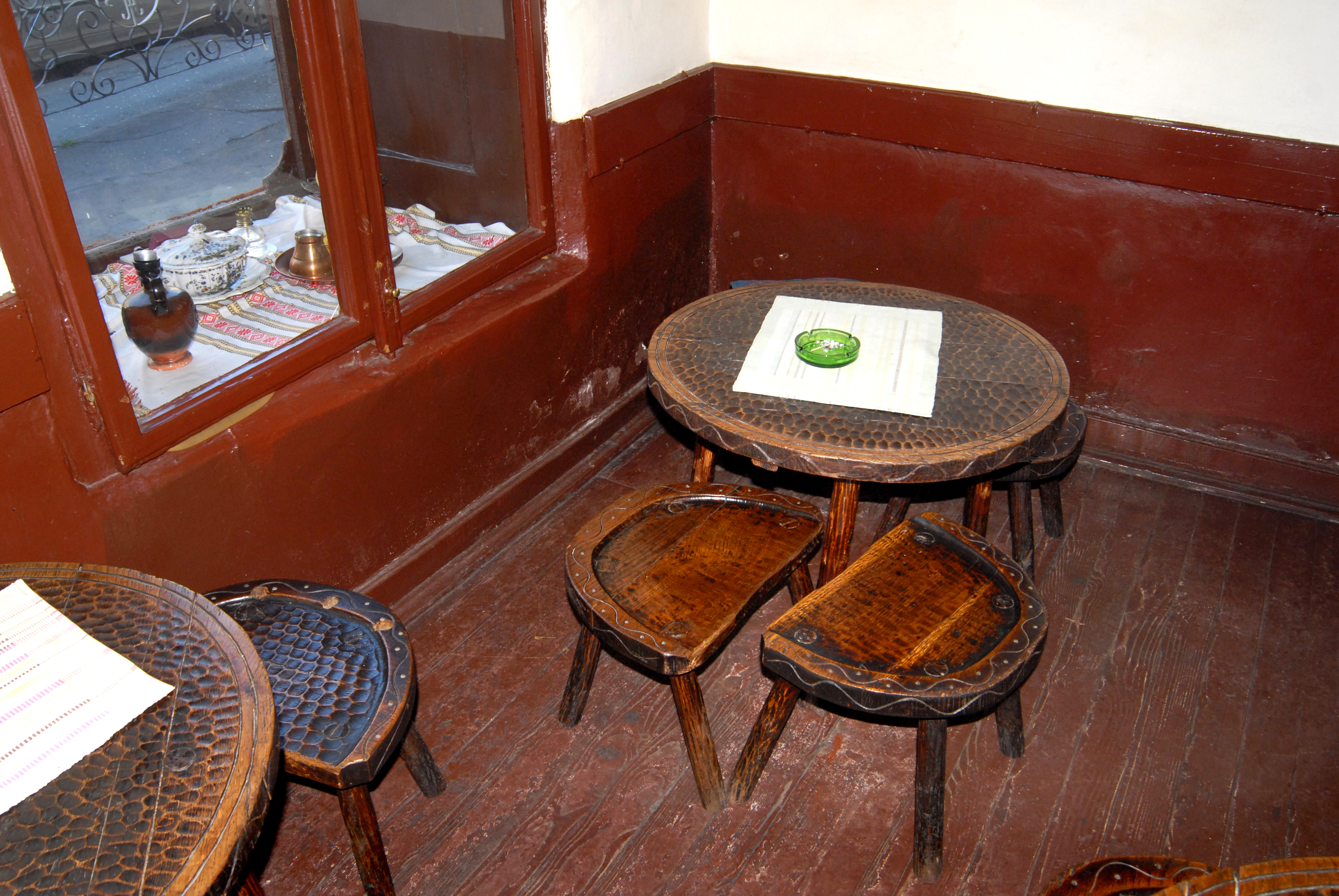
Interior

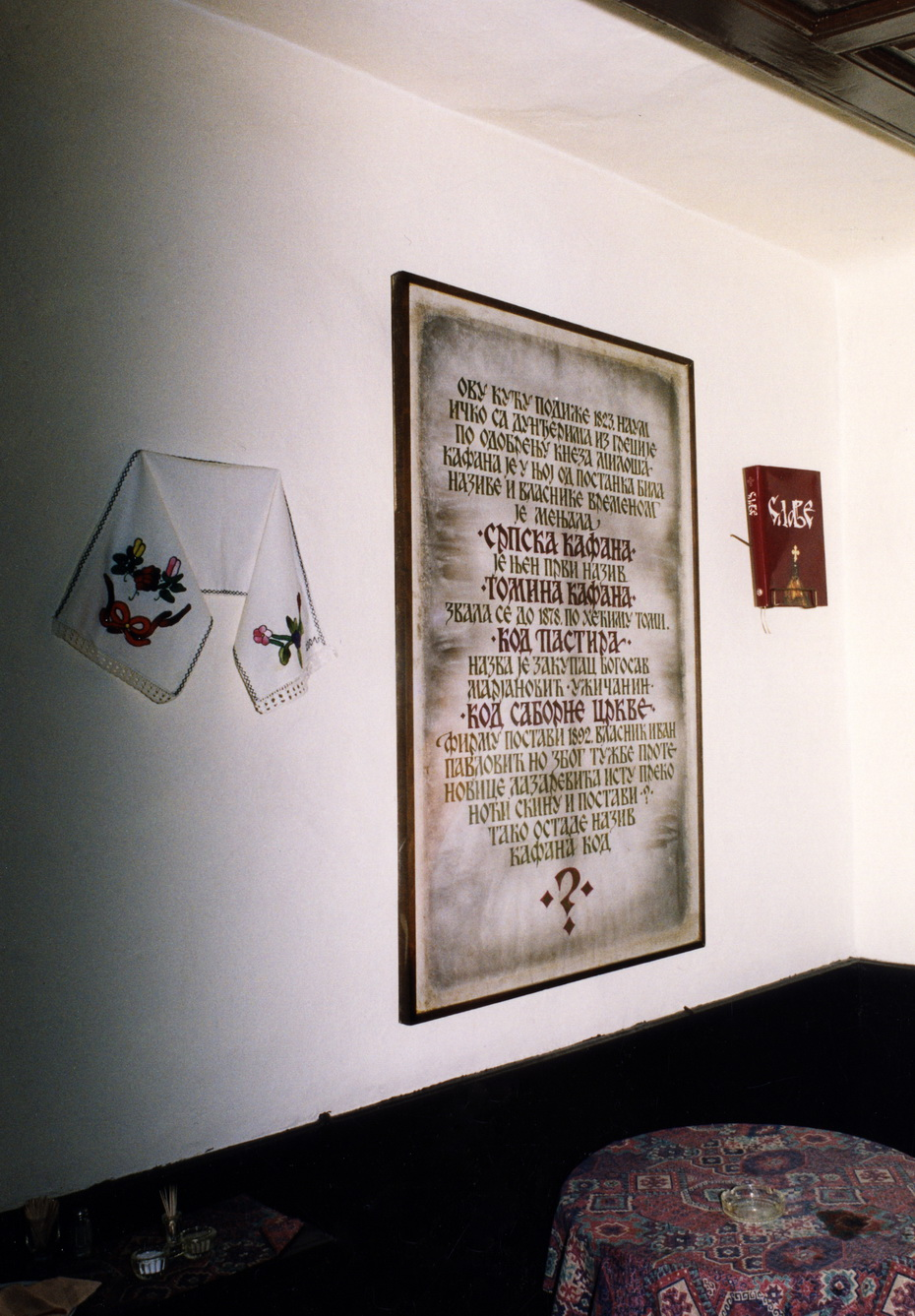
Interior
