= Charles-Éléonore Dufriche-Desgenettes =

French Catholic priest (1778–1860)

The Reverend Father Charles-Éléonore Dufriche-Desgenettes
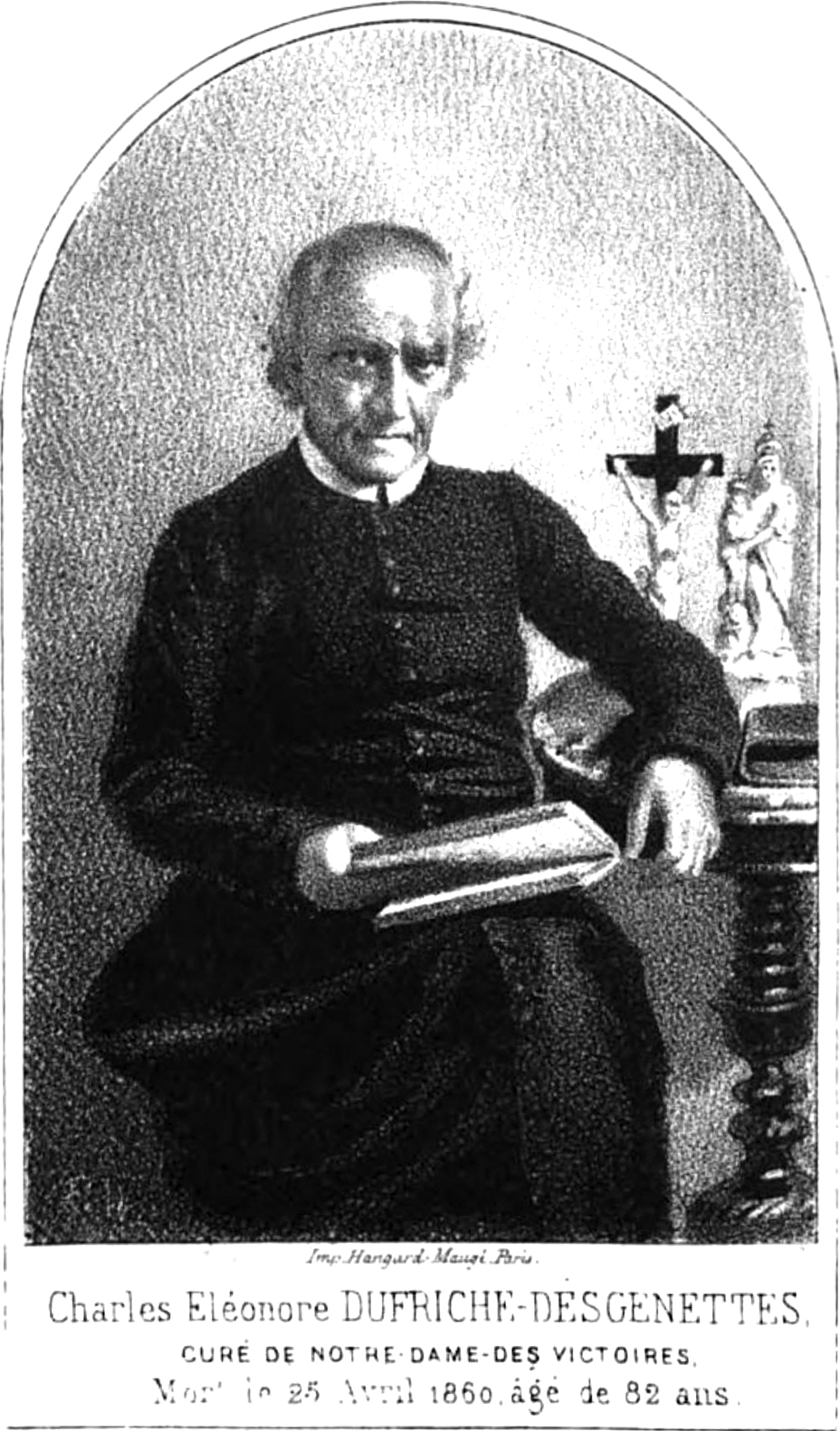

Personal details
- Born: Charles-Éléonore Dufriche-Desgenettes; August 10, 1778 Alençon
- Died: 25 April 1860 (aged 81) Paris
- Denomination: Catholic (Latin Church)
- Profession: Priest, teacher, Missionary, Theologian, writer

Ordination history of Charles-Éléonore Dufriche-Desgenettes
History
Priestly ordination
- Date: June 9, 1805

Charles-Éléonore Dufriche-Desgenettes (August 10, 1778 in Alençon – April 25, 1860 in Paris) is the founder of the Archconfraternity of the Most Holy and Immaculate Heart of Mary.

== Biography ==
During his youth, Dufriche-Desgenettes revealed a character that was difficult to control, while at the same time one of great courage. In 1792, when his father had approved the Civil Constitution of the Clergy, he was barely 14 years old, and he sided with the unsworn (not government authorized) priests. During his studies in Chartres, he refused to be honored in a public distribution of prizes by a constitutional bishop. At night he visited the unsworn priests in their hiding places, and provided for their needs, such that his activities resulted in the imprisonment of his own father. He did not hesitate to appear before the revolutionary tribunal and ask for his father's release, which he obtained, to the astonishment of all those whom this bold action of his had frightened. Alarmed at the dangers to which he exposed himself with such audacity and boldness, his parents retired to their country home in Saint-Lomer/Courtomer, but his conduct was the same. In 1794, during the fall of Robespierre, he launched an assault on prisons to release the prisoners. He also helped to reopen the churches.

Dufriche-Desgenettes had a long-standing desire to become a priest, which his parents had long opposed. Having finally yielded to his call, he began his theological studies after returning from a forced stay in his native city. He entered the seminary of Sées in 1803, he was ordained a priest on June 9, 1805. He was successively vicar of Saint-Lomer currently known as Courtomer, Le Plantis, Gasprée (currently Aubusson) and Ferrières-la-Verrerie, vicar in Argentan and the parish priest or pastor of Alençon.

Dufriche-Desgenettes administered the sacraments to prisoners during the Spanish war and contracted typhoid fever. When Napoleon I first held Pope Pius VII prisoner at Fontainebleau, he risked his life by serving as a messenger between the Pope and the faithful clergy. During the Hundred Days, he had to go into hiding when the emperor returned to power for having rejoiced too openly at the emperor's fall. He thought briefly of entering the Jesuits, but the latter did not receive him.

Soon after, he became pastor of the Paris Foreign Missions Society, and accomplished so much good in this work, and the public acclaim to his honor and reputation increased so greatly that Monsignor Frayssinous thought for a moment to have him appointed a bishop. However, Father Desgenettes' toughness of character made him dismiss the idea. The revolution of 1830 brought Father Desgenettes back to Switzerland, ostensibly under the pretext of healing his weakened health. In Freiburg, where he spent two years, the See (or bishopric) of Geneva and the French See of Moscow were offered to him but Father Desgenettes refused to accept them. Two years later, cholera broke out in Paris, and the archbishop claimed his services to treat the victims. Although ill, he did not hesitate a moment, and returned to his post at the Paris Foreign Missions Society, deploying, as in the past, an indefatigable zeal.

After having refused the Bishopric of Verdun and the Bishopric of Corsica, Dufriche-Desgenettes accepted the worst parish of Paris, the one where impiety and corruption were at their height: "the parish of the Petits-Pères" at the Basilica of Notre-Dame-des-Victoires, Paris (Our Lady of Victories). During the first four years, all his efforts proved to be completely fruitless. He thought of giving his resignation, when he thought he heard one day, while celebrating Mass, a voice in his heart that told him to consecrate his parish to the Most Holy and Immaculate Heart of Mary. After struggling with this thought, which never left him, he believed it to be a divine inspiration and yielded by celebrating, on December 11, 1836, the Consecration of his parish to the Immaculate Heart of Mary.

From then on, the conversions began, and a remarkable change came over those in the parish neighborhood of Our Lady of Victories. On April 24, 1838, Pope Gregory XVI raised the small Brotherhood of Our Lady of Victories to the rank of a Universal Archconfraternity, the Archconfraternity of the Immaculate Heart of Mary. For twenty-three years, Dufriche-Desgenettes faithfully presided over his evening meetings, setting himself up in the pulpit, to make recommendations, to recount the graces obtained and to evangelize the people gathered at the foot of the altars. Father Desgenettes always exhibited patience, kindness and charity, mastering any mood swings that he suffered, but he also asked publicly for forgiveness twice a year. With the energy that characterized him, he had worked to overcome his quick and impetuous character, and he became one of the gentlest, most patient, most affable of men, and also one of the most humble of men. The praise he received afflicted him. When he was told about the high respect others had for him, Father Desgenettes showed his discontent by saying cheerfully: "My name! my reputation! it is the worldly-wise who court the world." His charity equaled his humility: he never met anyone in misery along his way, without helping them.

Consumed by excessive fatigue, his life suddenly began to decline rapidly. On November 4, 1839, he celebrated Mass for the last time, but he continued for some time, nevertheless, to hear confessions and complete all the duties of a pastor and priest, such that he was the subject of great edification to others by his prayerfulness and piety. He spent his last three weeks in his room, received the last sacraments on April 20, 1860, and died on the 25th of that month.

Dying, he bequeathed his papers to one of his priests, Father Defossés, who published them in four volumes containing 146 exhortations, instructions, and sermons.

== Publications ==
- Manuel d’instruction et de prières, 10e|édit., 1844, in-12.
- Vie du Francis Libermann, fondateur de la Société du Saint-Cœur de Marie, Le Mans, 1855, in-8°.
- Œuvres inédites contenant des Sermons, Prônes, etc., avec Notice biographique, Paris, 1860, 4 vol. in-12.

== Sources ==
- Revue du monde catholique, t. 3, Paris, 1862, 96 p. (lire en ligne [archive]), p. 68-70.
- Henry J. Koren (trad. Joseph Bouchaud), Les Spiritains : trois siècles d’histoire religieuse et missionnaire : histoire de la Congrégation du Saint-Esprit, Paris, Beauchesne, 1982, 633 p. (ISBN 9782701010465, lire en ligne [archive]), p. 204.
