= Notre-Dame-des-Victoires, Paris =

Basilica church in Paris

Notre-Dame des Victoires
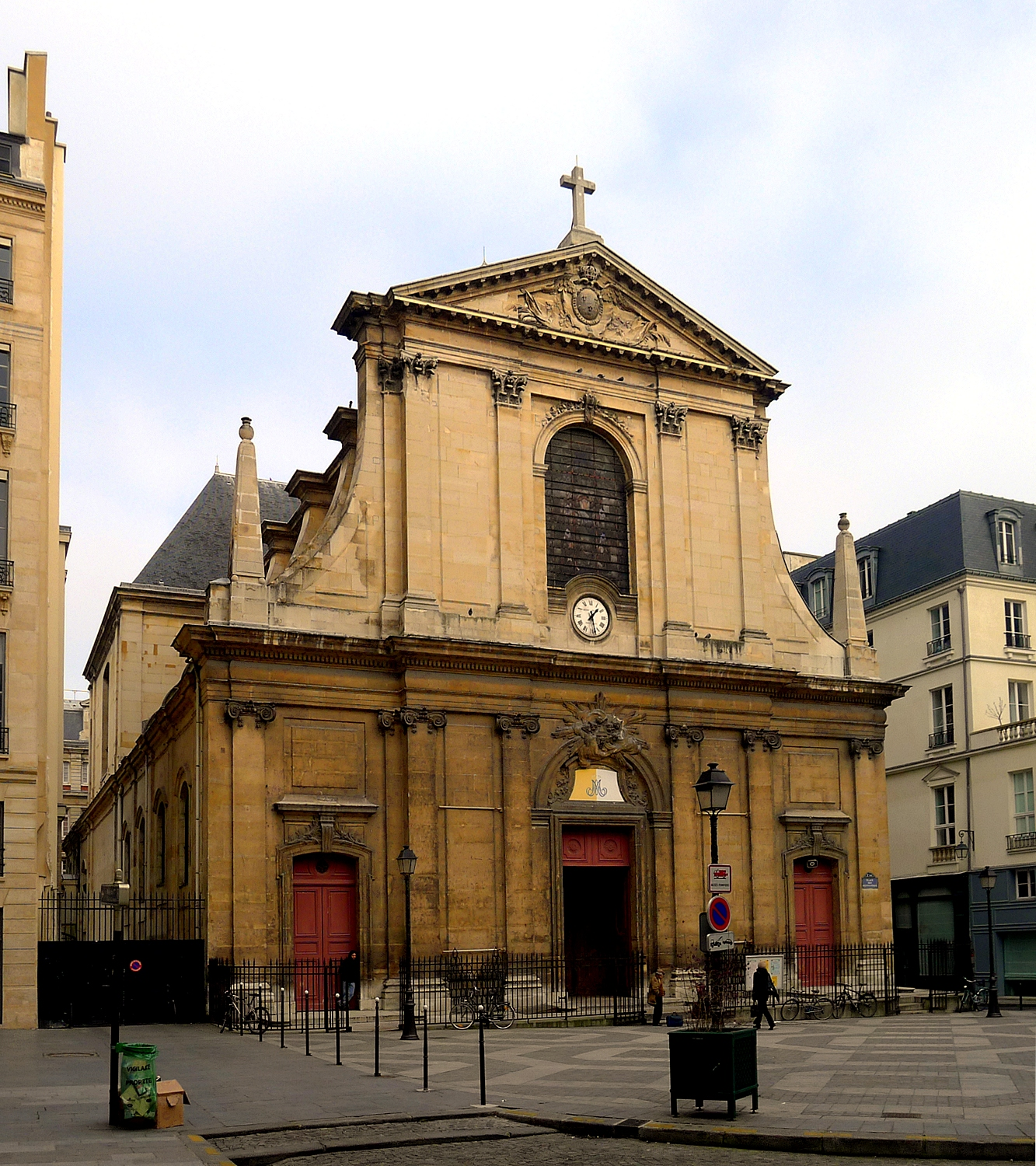
- Notre-Dame des Victoires

Religion
- Affiliation: Catholic Church
- Province: Archdiocese of Paris
- Region: Île-de-France
- Rite: Roman Rite
- Status: Active

Location
- Location: 6 Rue Notre Dame des Victoires, 2e
- State: France
- Interactive map of Notre-Dame des Victoires
- Coordinates: 48°52′0″N 2°20′27″E

Architecture
- Type: Church
- Style: Baroque
- Groundbreaking: 1629
- Completed: 1740

Website
- www.notredamedesvictoires.com

The Notre-Dame-des-Victoires (French pronunciation: [nɔtʁə dam de viktwaʁ]) is a minor basilica located on rue Notre-Dame-des-Victoires in the 2nd arrondissement of Paris. It was begun as an abbey church and constructed between 1629 and 1740 in the French classical style. Its name was given by King Louis XIII, who dedicated it to his victory over the Protestants at La Rochelle in 1628 during the French Wars of Religion. Notre-Dame-des-Victoires is famous for the ex voto offerings left there by the faithful. Over 37,000 devotional plaques, silver and gold hearts, as well as military decorations, have been left at the basilica. The closest Métro station is 'Bourse'.

== History ==
=== 17th and 18th century ===
In 1629 the Discalced Augustinians (so-called because of their embrace of poverty and custom of wearing sandals instead of shoes), colloquially referred to as the "Petits Pères", established a convent, Notre-Dame-des-Victoires, on three hectares of land located at the intersection of the Place des Petits-Pères and Rue de la Banque. 1629–1740. The first stone was laid by King Louis XIII, who dedicated the church as a monument to his victories over the Protestants, particularly the Siege of La Rochelle in 1628.

The first church was soon too small for the rapidly-growing parish, so construction of a larger church began in 1656, with a plan by Pierre Le Muet. One hundred eleven years passed, and four other architects, Libéral Bruant, Robert Boudin, Gabriel Leduc and Sylvain Cartaud were engaged. Cartaud contributed the expanded nave, the facade. and the domed roof. The new church was finally consecrated in 1740. In 1778 Wolfgang Mozart prayed in the church.

=== Late 18th-19th century ===
The church became famous for its library, which had more than forty-thousand works. However, during the French Revolution, the church was closed, and the library was scattered. The church was used as the headquarters of the national lottery, then was occupied as the first home of the Paris Bourse, or stock market, It was not returned to the church until 1809. The other buildings of the monastery were destroyed in 1858 and a police station as well as an office for the mayor of the arrondissement were constructed in their place. The church was closed and pillaged again during the Paris Commune in 1871.

After 1809 Notre Dame des Victoires became a parish church, but as it was located in a business area, it had few parishioners. The curé Charles-Éléonore Dufriche-Desgenettes thought he had failed in his ministry and wanted to resign his functions in Our Lady of Victories when on 3 December 1836, during the Consecration of the Mass, he received what he believed to be an instantaneous and complete intellectual infusion of the requirements, rules and activities for the Archconfraternity of the Immaculate Heart of Mary from the Blessed Virgin Mary who also inspired Fr. Desgenettes to consecrate the parish to her Immaculate Heart and to invite men living and working in the parish area to come to a meeting (500 men came to the first meeting).

White Scapular of the Archconfraternity of the Immaculate Heart of Mary

At the meeting Fr. Desgenettes invited the men to wear a White Scapular with an image of the Immaculate Heart of Mary and the words "SWEET HEART OF MARY BE MY SALVATION" on the front scapular and the symbols and words "REFUGE OF SINNERS, PRAY FOR US" on the back scapular. They initially called this parish men's group: the Confraternity of Our Lady, Refuge of Sinners. Fr. Desgenettes wrote down his entire inspiration and immediately submitted it to the Holy See. Only two years later, in 1838, Pope Gregory XVI approved and established the Archconfraternity of the Immaculate Heart of Mary. By 1870, there were 22 million members of this archconfraternity worldwide and a religious congregation founded by Saint Anthony Mary Claret, the Sons of the Immaculate Heart of Mary, aka Claretians or Claretian Missionary Fathers (CMF).

Many of the famous French Catholics of the period maintained a connection to the church. These included Marie-Alphonse Ratisbonne, Ven. Francis Libermann and the refounders of the Holy Ghost Fathers and a whole host of foreign mission seminarians and priests, including St. Theophane Venard. Cardinal John Henry Newman went there to give thanks for his conversion, which had been the subject of prayer there. Later, the young Therese Martin prayed before the same statue for Our Lady's help in realizing her vocation.

In 1836 the church was rededicated by Abbot Charles Desgenettes to the Sacred Heart of the Virgin Mary. This was formally approved by Pope Gregory XVI. The church was raised to the status of a minor basilica by Pope Pius XI in 1927. The church now serves as a place of prayer for the rector and clergy of the Community of Benedictines of Sacré-Cœur, Paris.

== Exterior ==
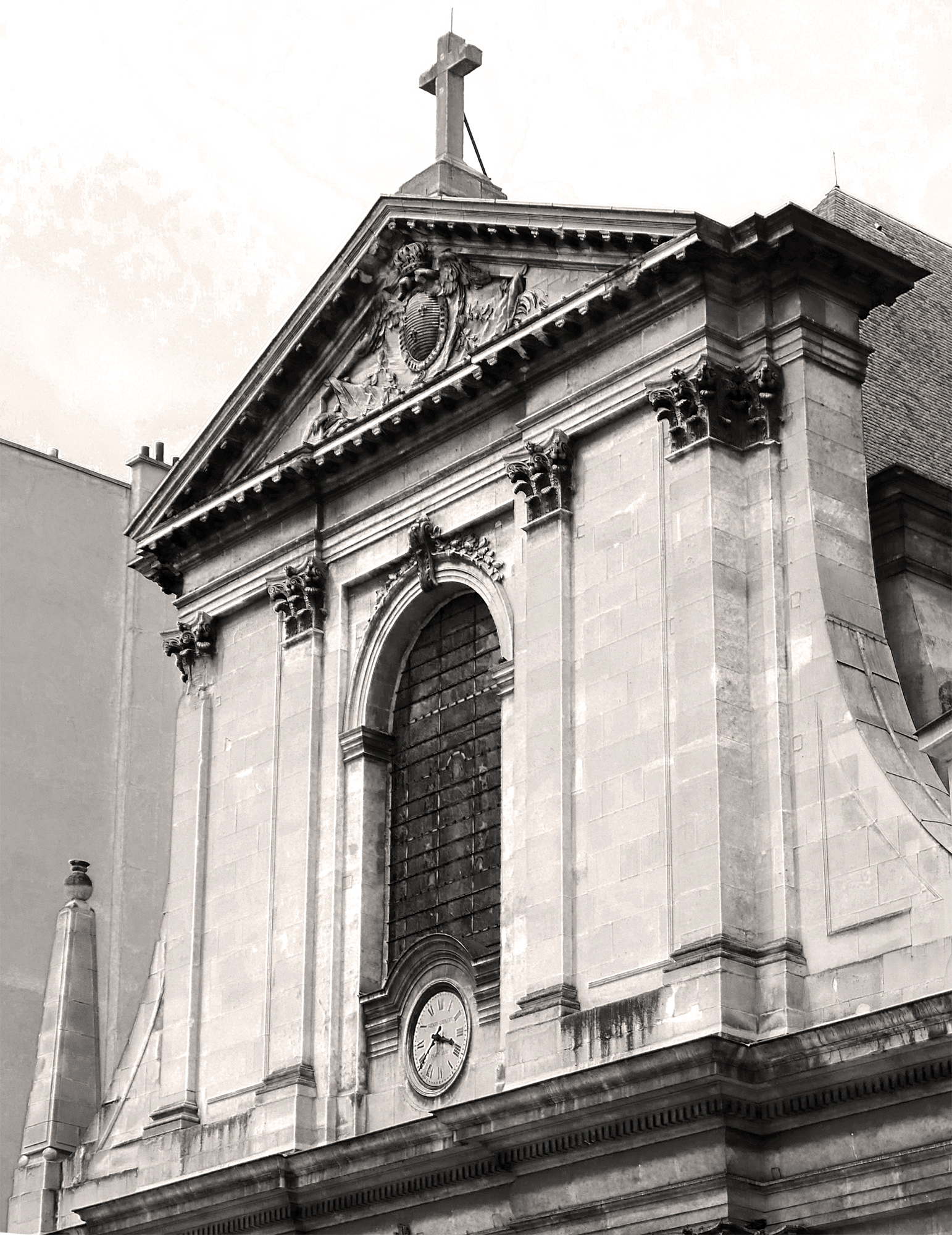
The fronton, with Corinthian capitals on the pilasters

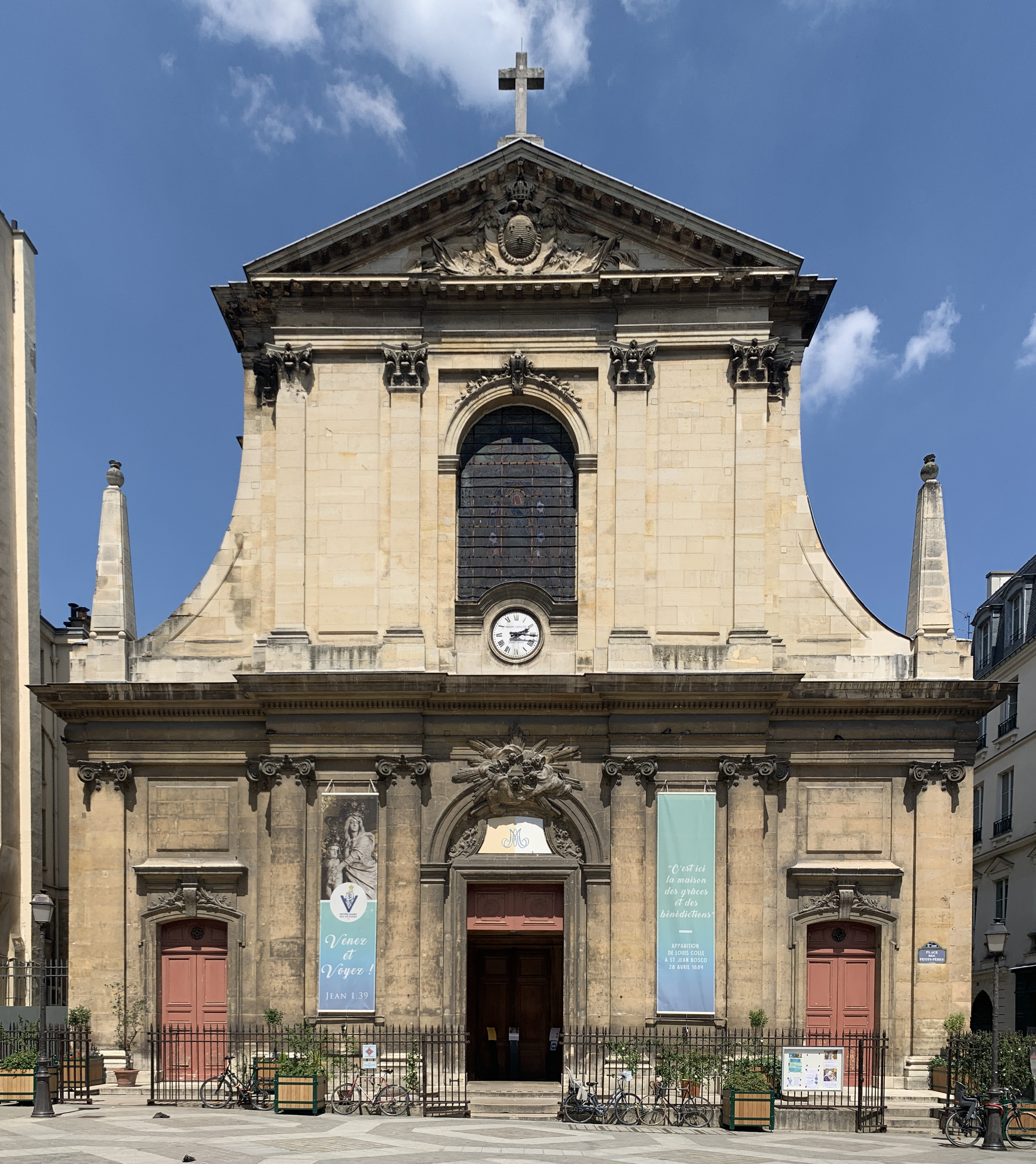
The facade

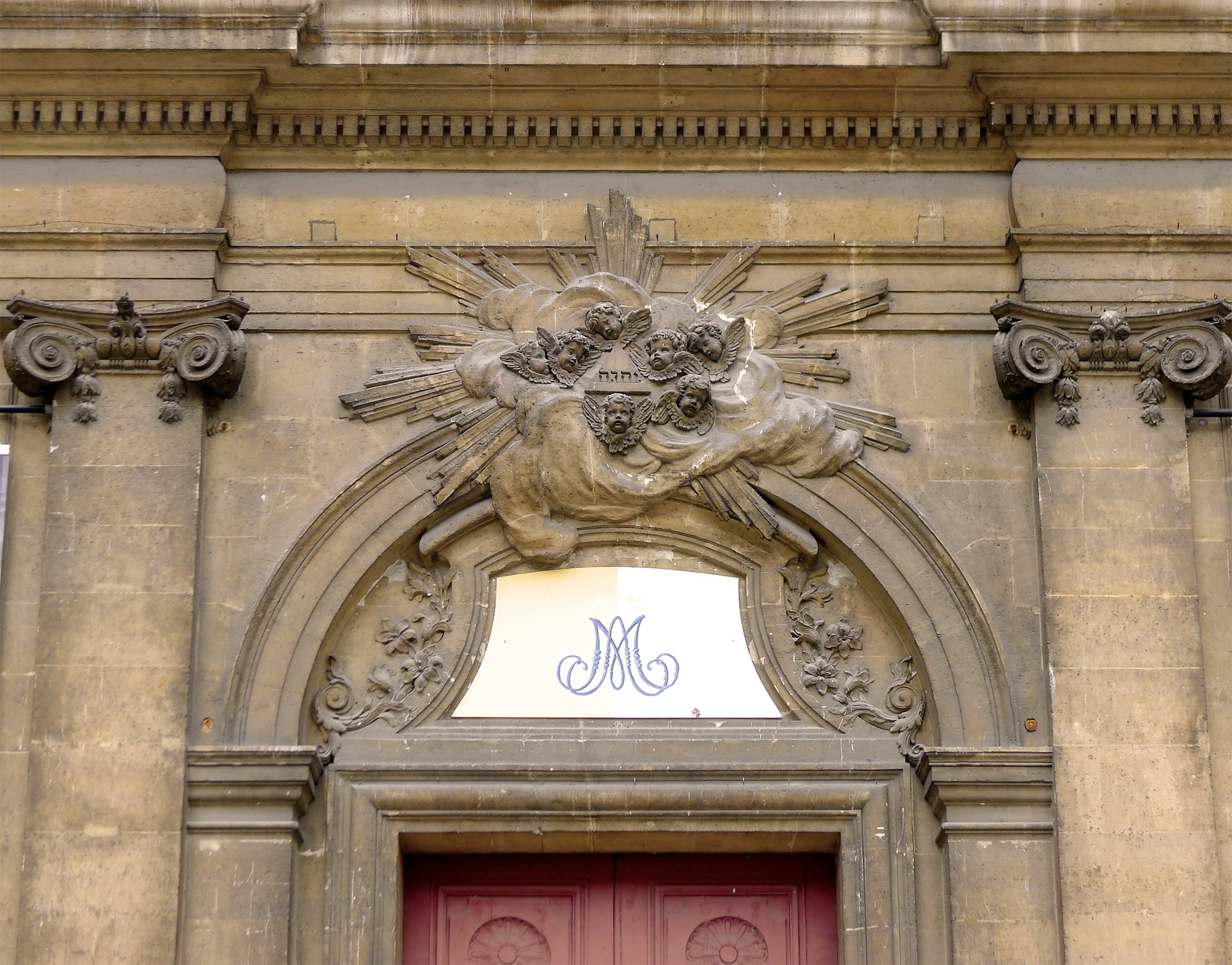
Detail of the portal, depicting a flight of angels

The facade of the church was completed in 1737 by the architect Jean-Sylvain Cartault in the French classical style, borrowed from the Church of the Gesù in Rome, and very popular for churches in Paris in the late 17th century and early 18th century. Built after the model of a Roman temple, the lower level is decorated with pilasters, or shallow decorative columns built into the wall, with capitals of the Ionic order, while the pilasters of the upper level have the acanthus leaf decoration of the Corinthian order.

The corners of the facade are braced with sloping buttresses in the form of reversed consoles, which are topped by obelisks or small towers.

At the top is a triangular fronton with decoration of sculpted palm leaves and drapery. It displays the royal coat-of-arms with fleurs-des-lis, surrounded by a cordon representing the Order of the Holy Spirit. At the top, just below the cross, is a crown representing King Louis XIII and his victories, from which the church takes its name.

The clock on the front of the church was made by Augustin Henry-Lepaute in 1886. It replaced a clock made by Niot & Chaponnel was installed circa 1827 having won a bronze medal.

== Interior ==
=== Nave and Choir ===
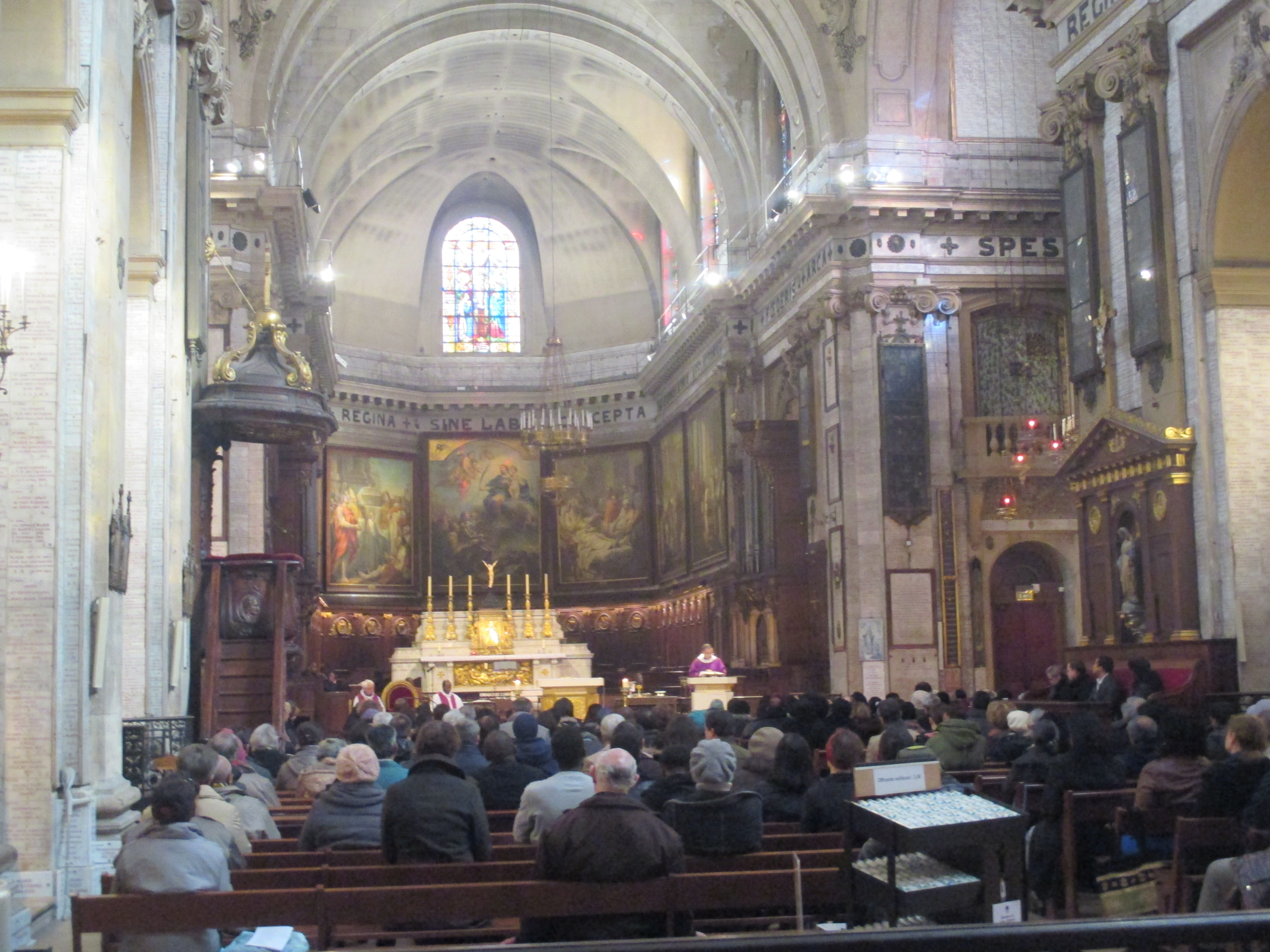
Transept and choir during a mass

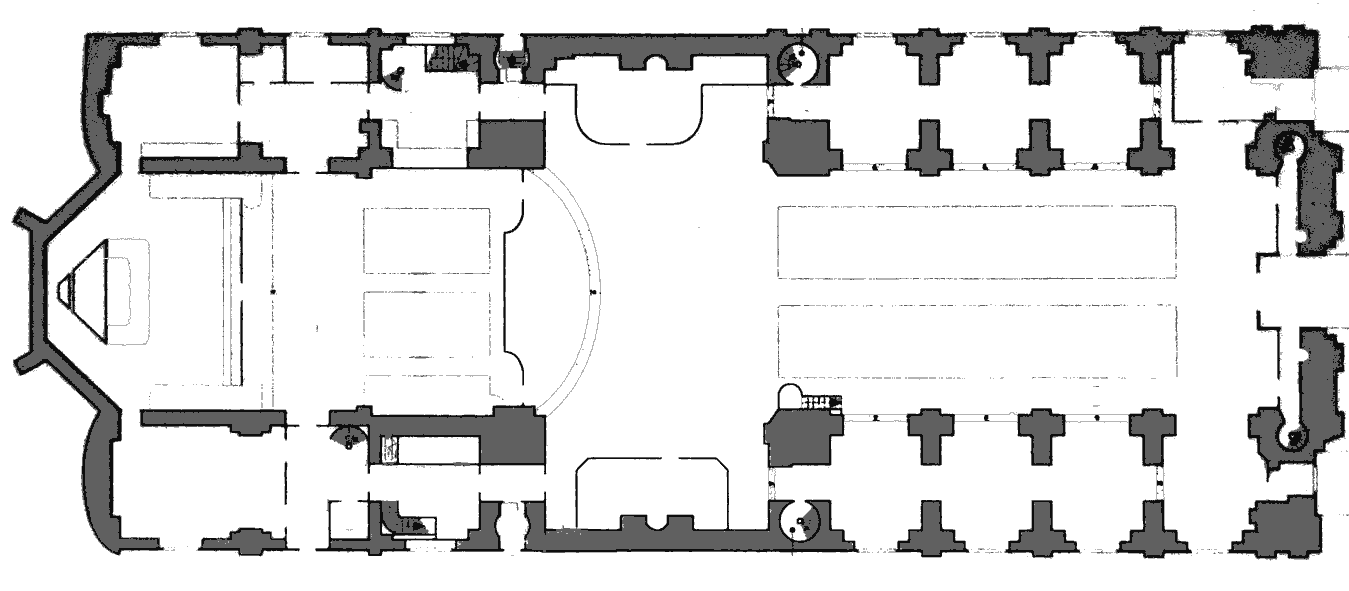
Plan of the church (Choir to left, transept in center, nave and chapels to right)

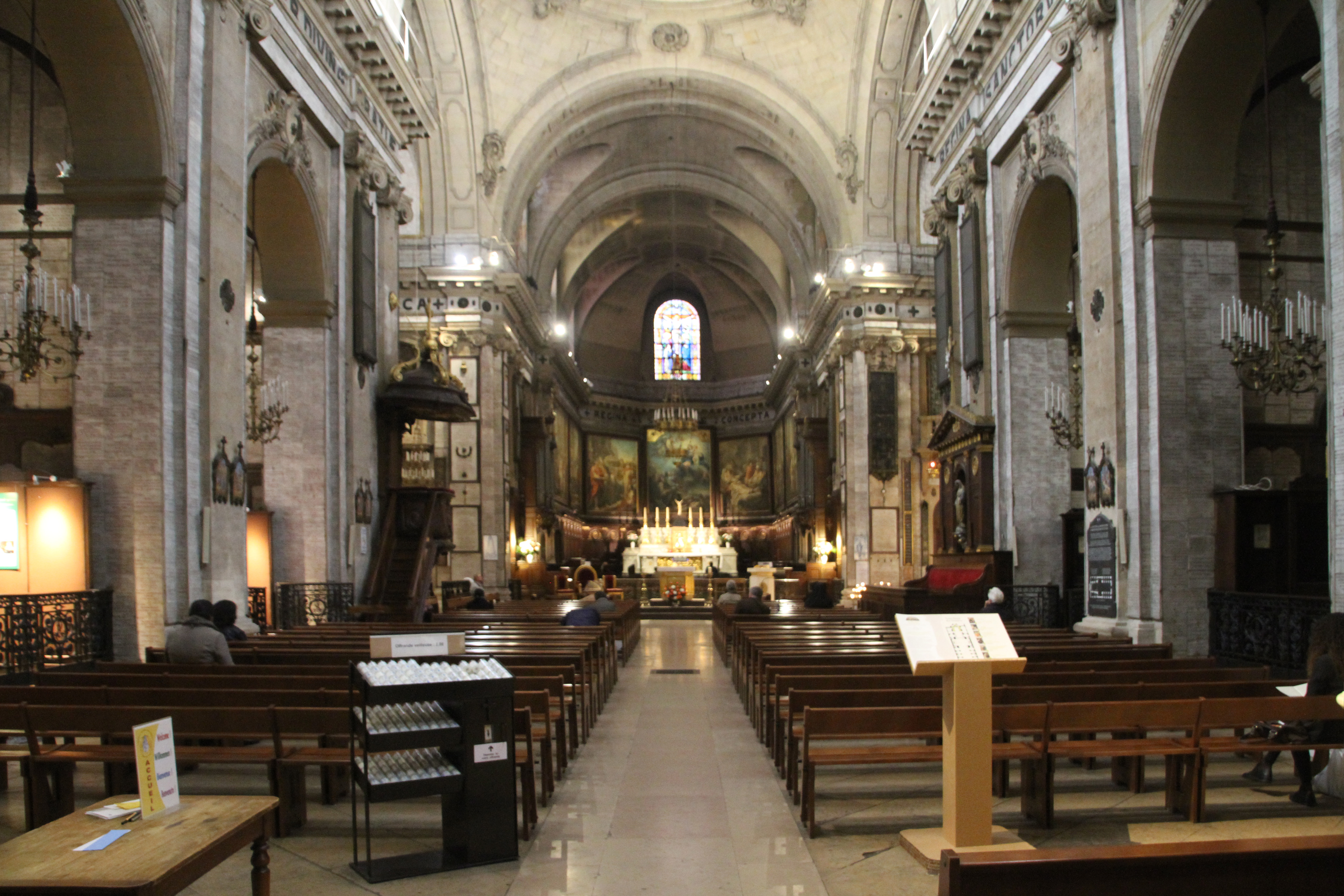
The nave, looking toward the choir, with chapels on both sides

The interior of the church is 62 meters long and 24.5 meters wide, with a height to the vaults of 15 meters.

The long nave is lined with columns creating an arcade with rounded arches. It is inspired by the Church of the Jesu in Rome, bringing the congregation in the nave closer to the altar. The choir, where the clergy are seated, occupies a third of the church, and features finely carved stalls from the 17th century along both sides. The interior decoration combines elements of the classical style, including cornices decorated with sculpted roses and columns with capitals of the Ionic order, with sculptural decoration in the Baroque style; garlands of flowers, seashells and cherubs.

The altar is a 20th-century work, designed by Madeleine Diener (1930–2000). It features sculpted portraits of eleven important religious figures from the 19th century whose work was connected Notre-Dame-des-Victoires, such as Emmanuel d'alcon, founder of the Congregation of Augustins of the Assumption. On top of the altar is crucifix carved from a single piece of ivory in the 17th century.

=== Vaults ===
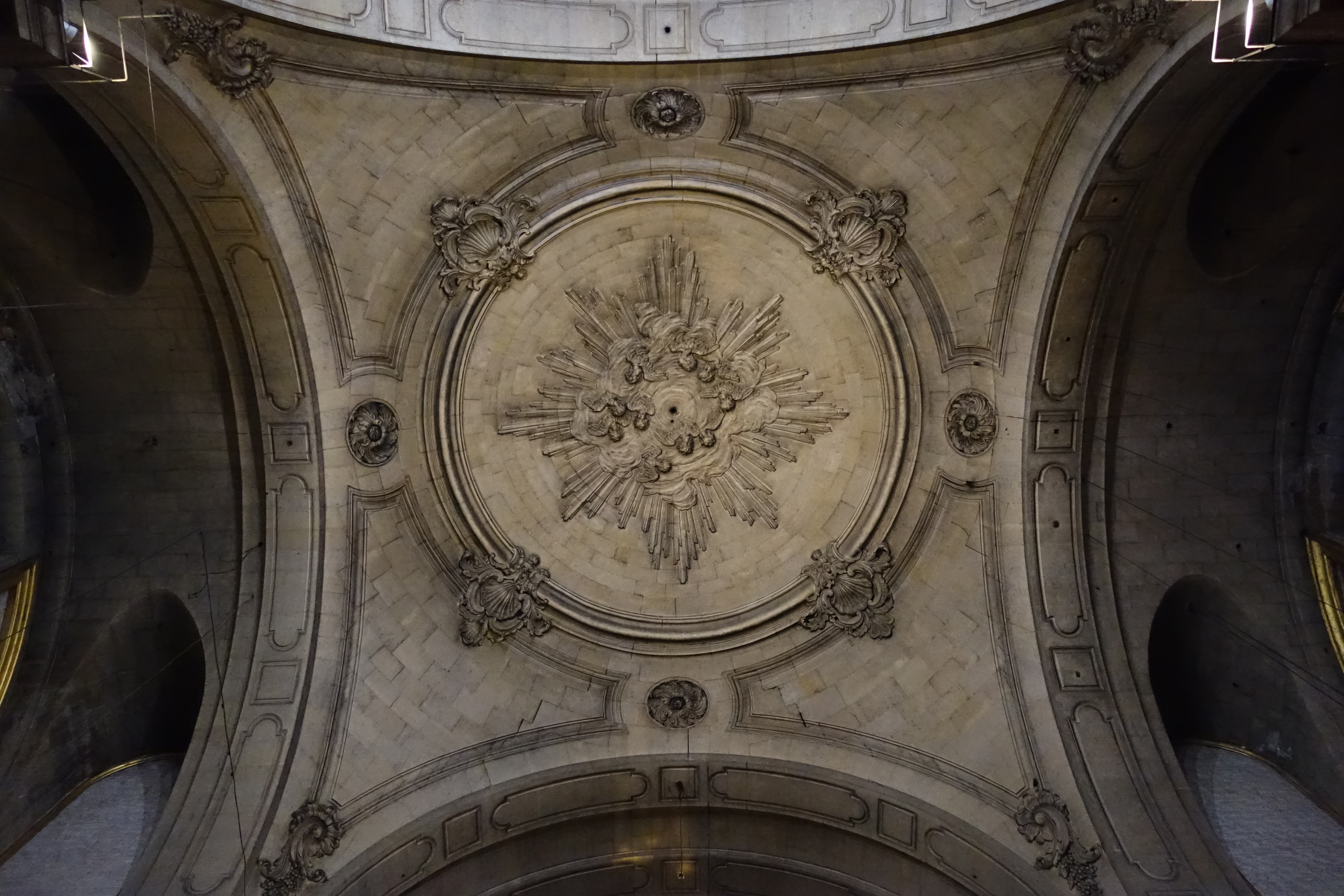
Transept vault - a flight of angels

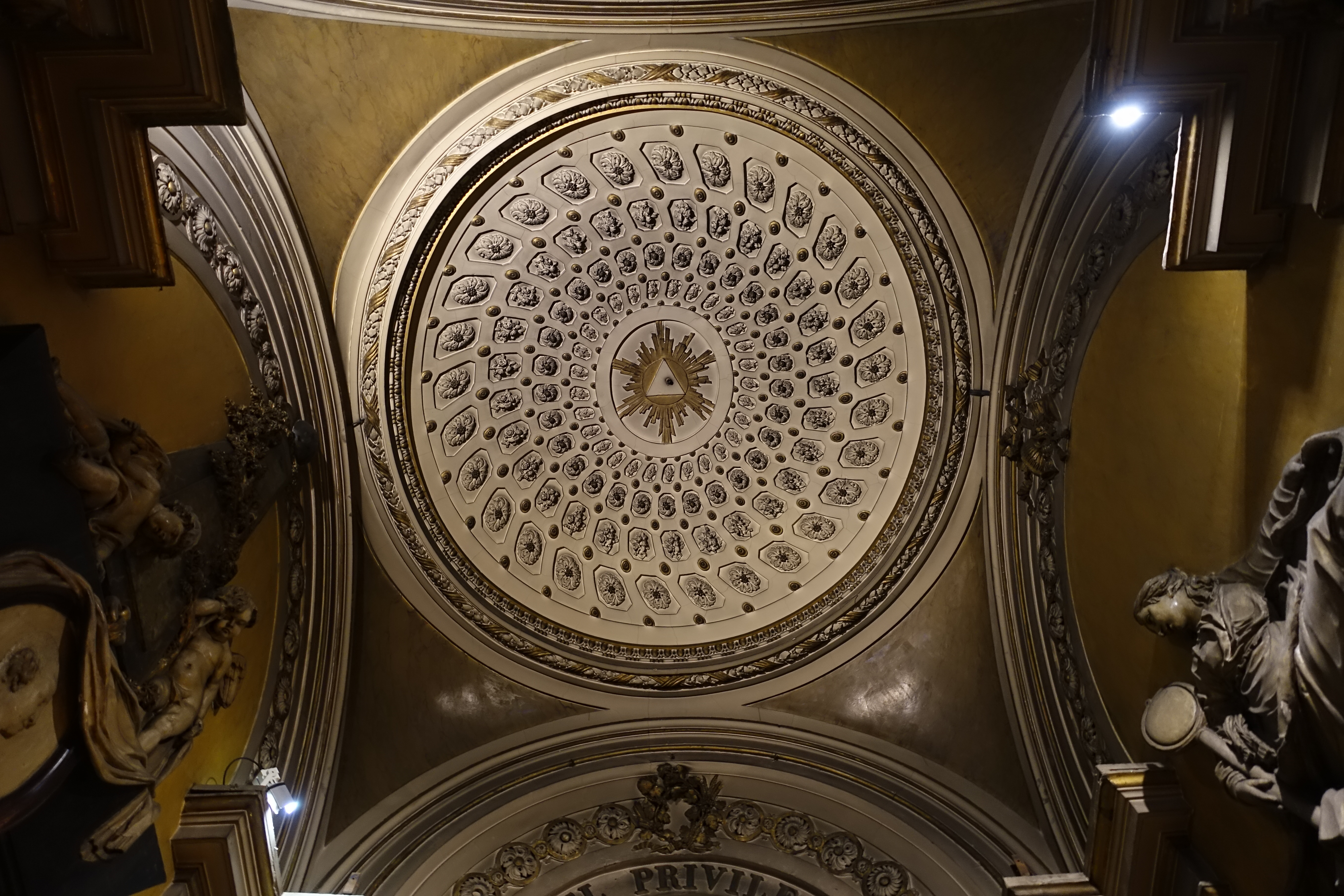
Decoraterd ceiling vault

The ceiling vaults are decorated with very expressive sculpture. The central vault over the transept features a flight of angels, while others merge Christian symbols and decorative designs.

=== Chapels ===
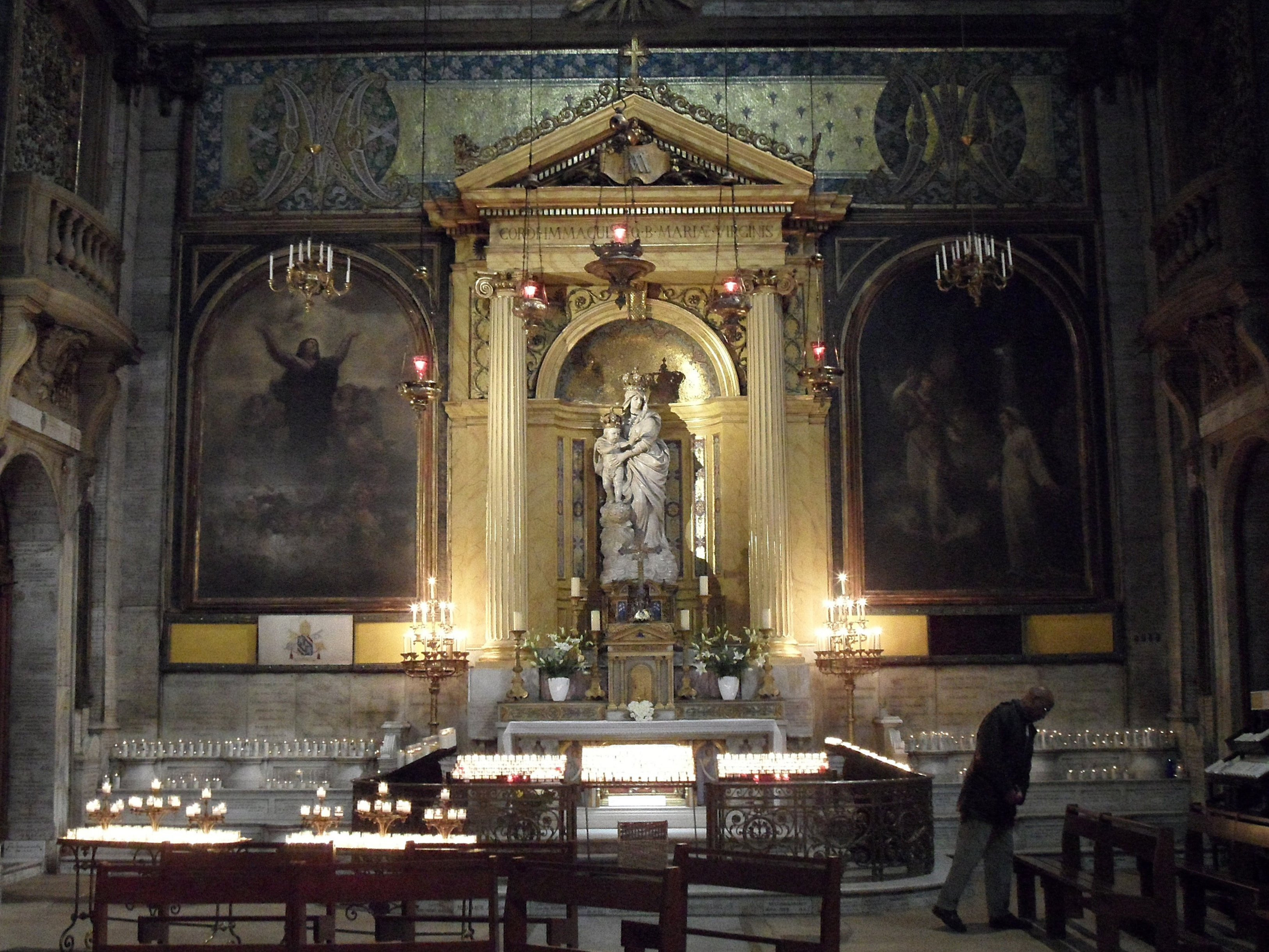
Chapel of the Virgin

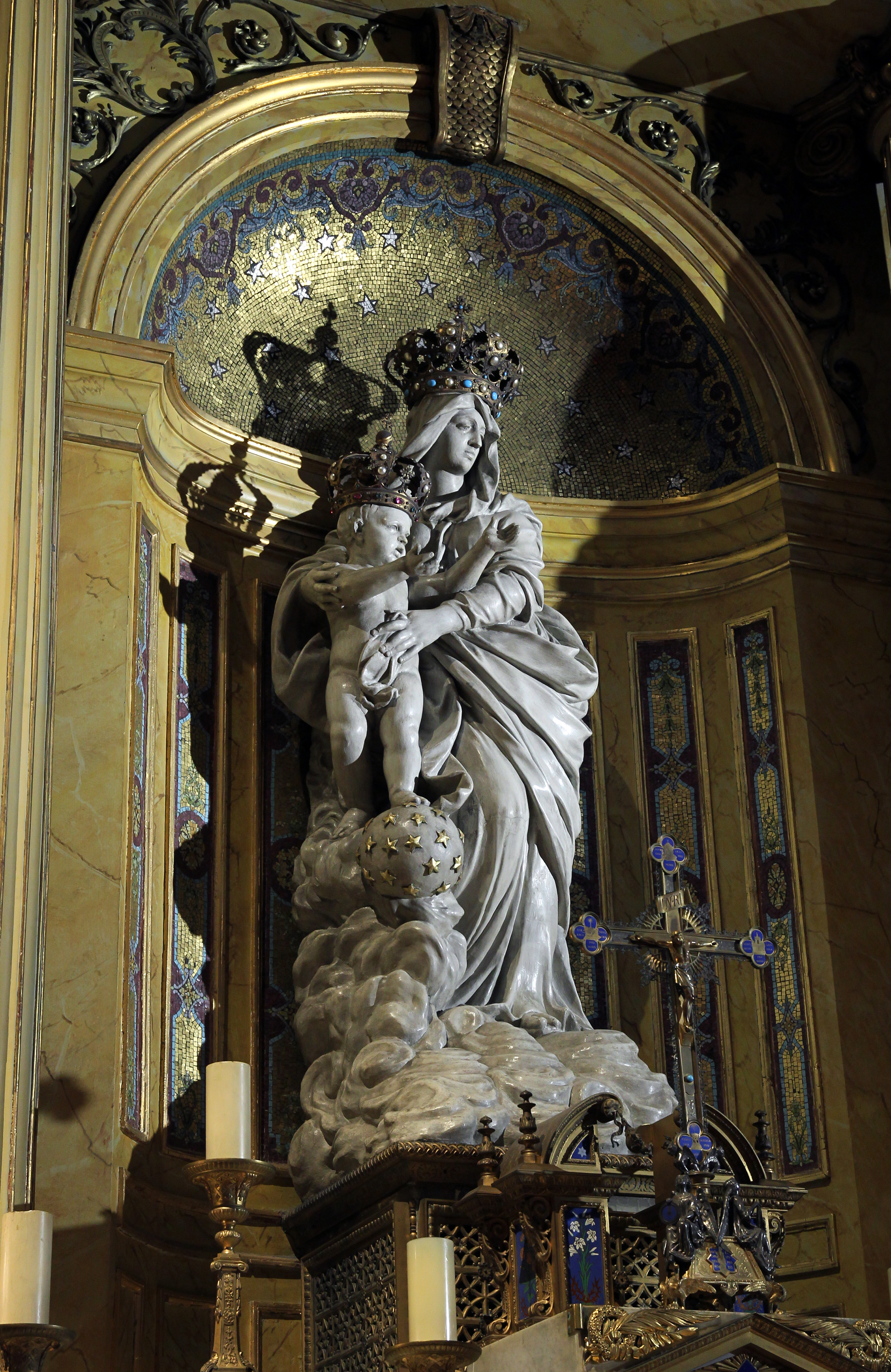
Detail of Chapel of Virgin

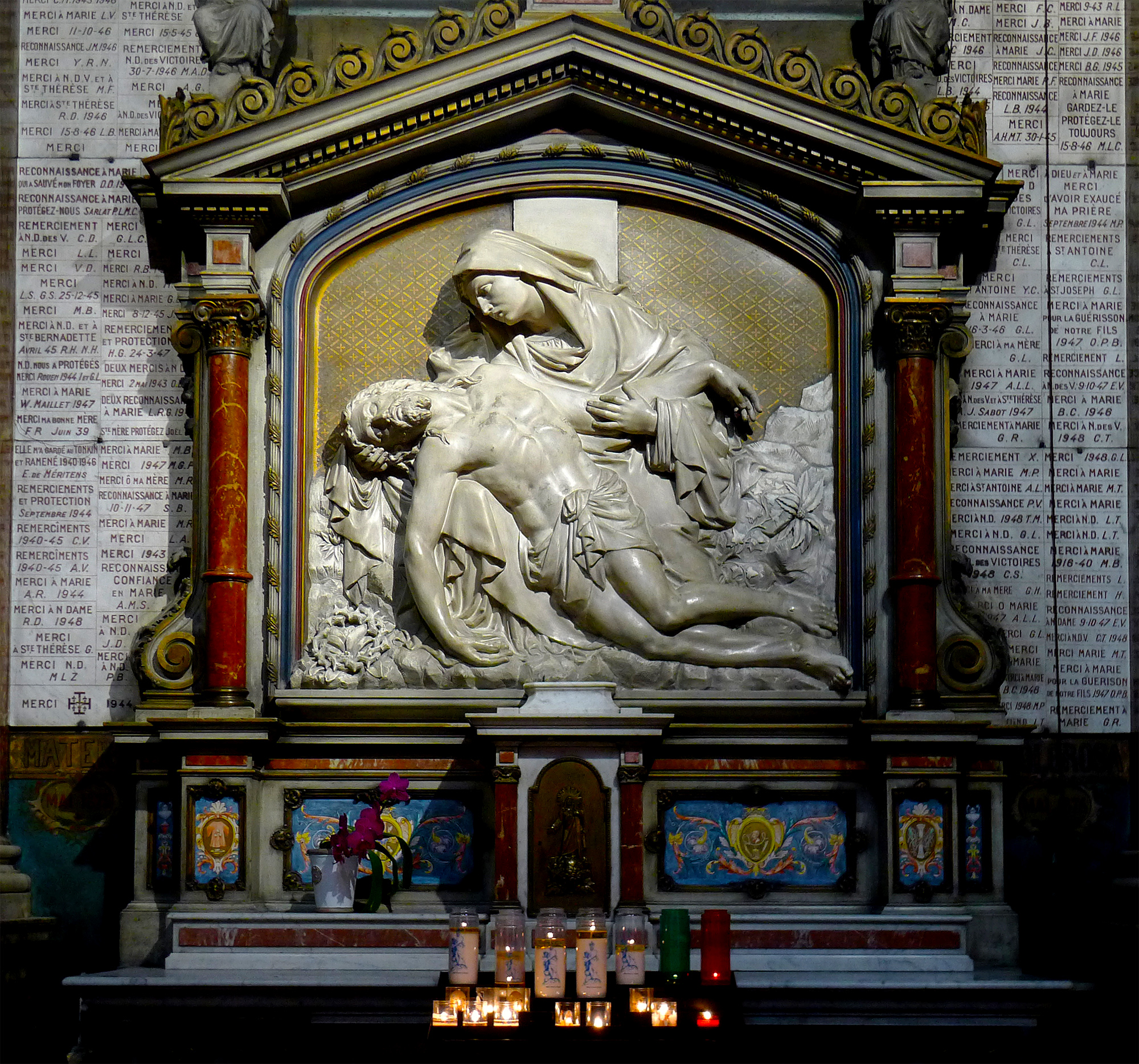
Chapel of Notre Dame of the Seven Sorrows

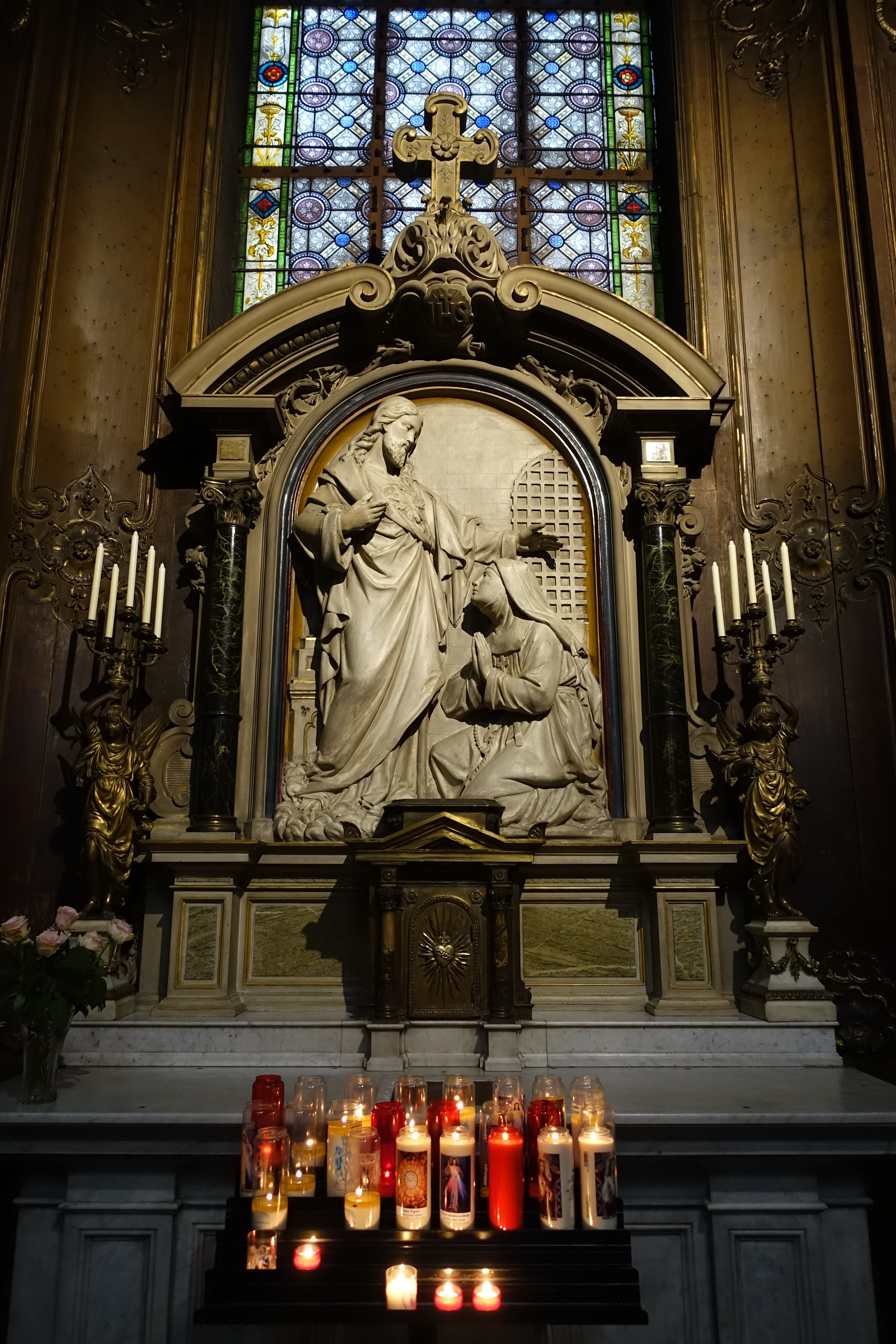
Chapel of the Sacred Heart (1870)

Chapels are located on both sides of the nave and the transept. Each chapelshas a central collateral aisle which makes it possible to pass from chapel to chapel.

-The Chapel of the Virgin is the largest chapel, located at the transept, and is dedicated to the Sacred and Immaculate Heart of the Virgin Mary. It is decorated with a statue of Mary holding the Christ child, both wearing crowns. By tradition, Special permission had to be sought from the Pope to present the figures with crowns. The statues are of plaster, and the sculptor is unknown. The chapel also displays a painting of the Annunciation by Charles-Louis Muller (1815–1892). Above the statue is the largest and most colorful stained glass window in the church, entitled "Our Lady - Refuge for Sinners."

-The Chapel of Saint Anne, the mother of the Virgin Mary, features a Bas-Relief of Saint Anne, "The Education of the Virgin", by Jacquier (1878).

-The Chapel of Saint John features a statue of Saint John made of gilded cast iron.

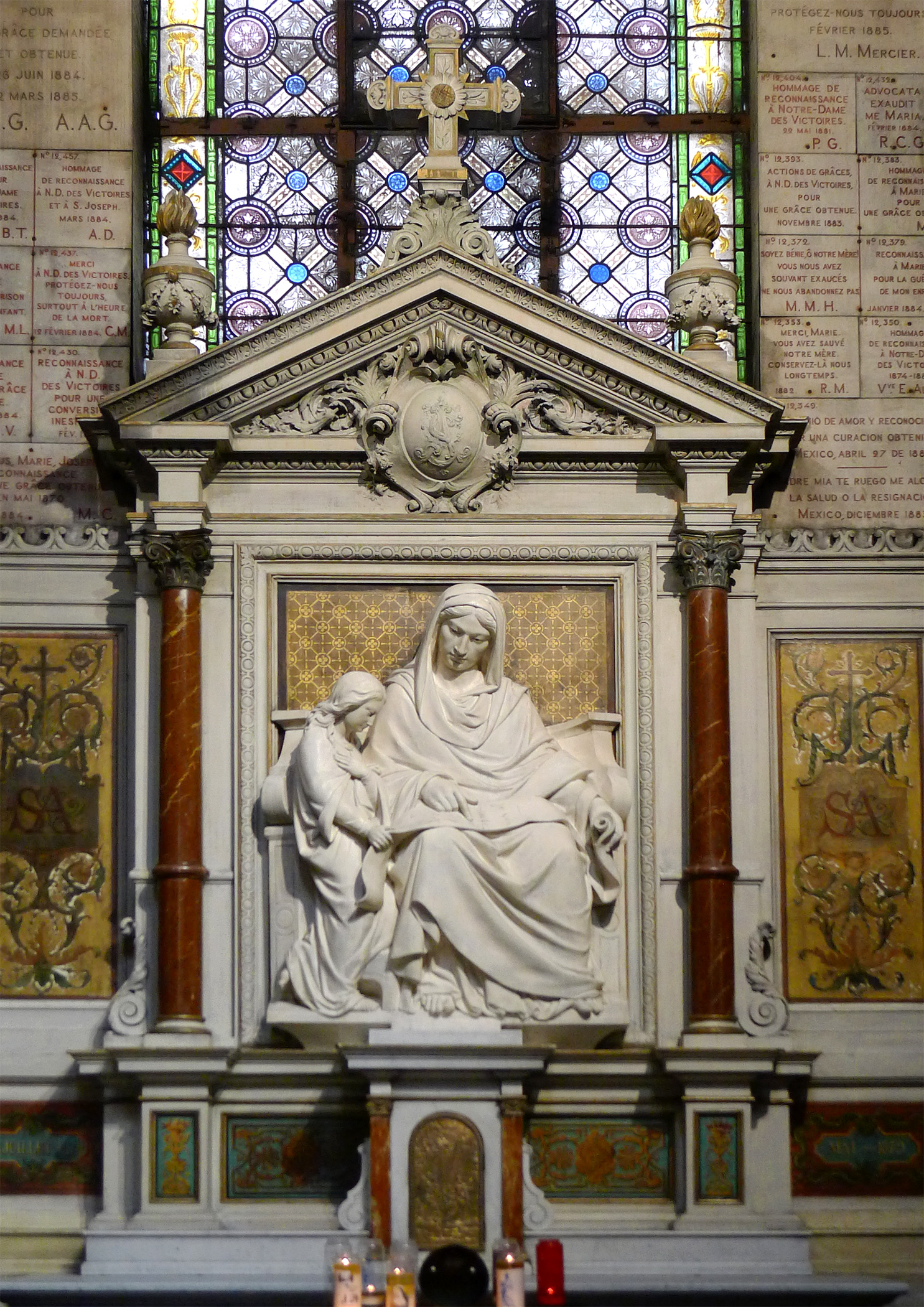
Saint Anne with the infant Virgin Mary, Chapel of Saint Anne

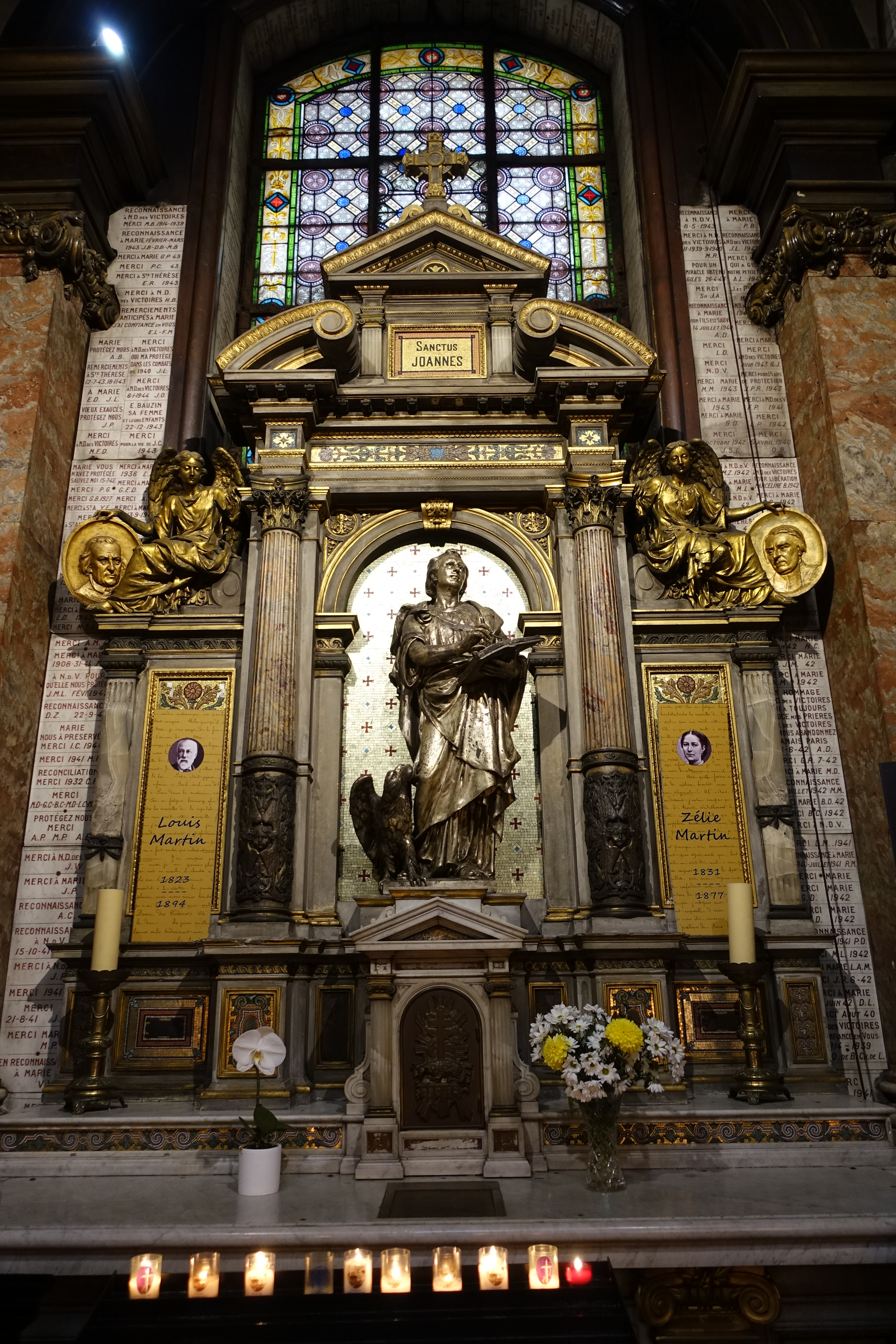
Chapel of Saint John the Evangelist

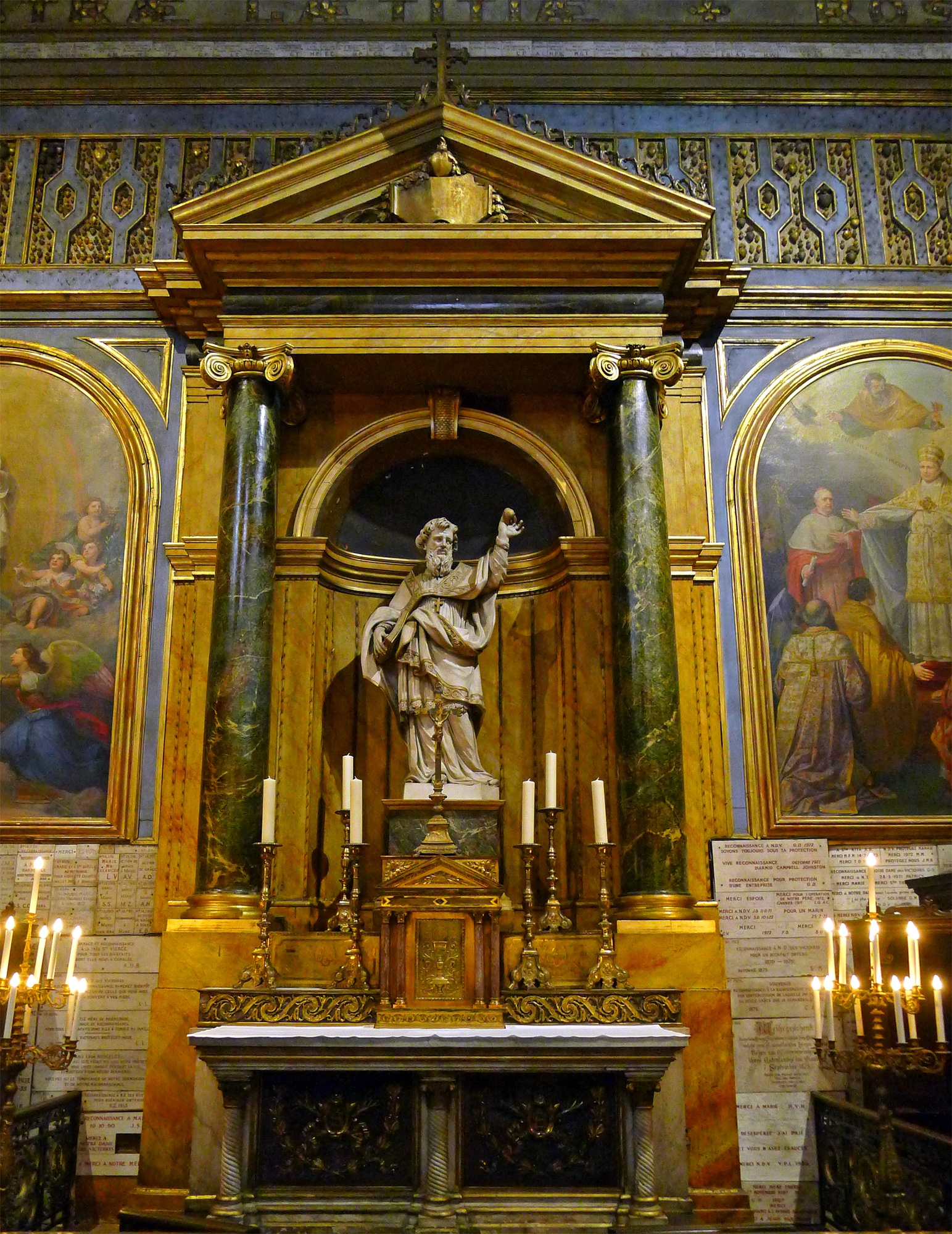
Chapel of Saint Augustine

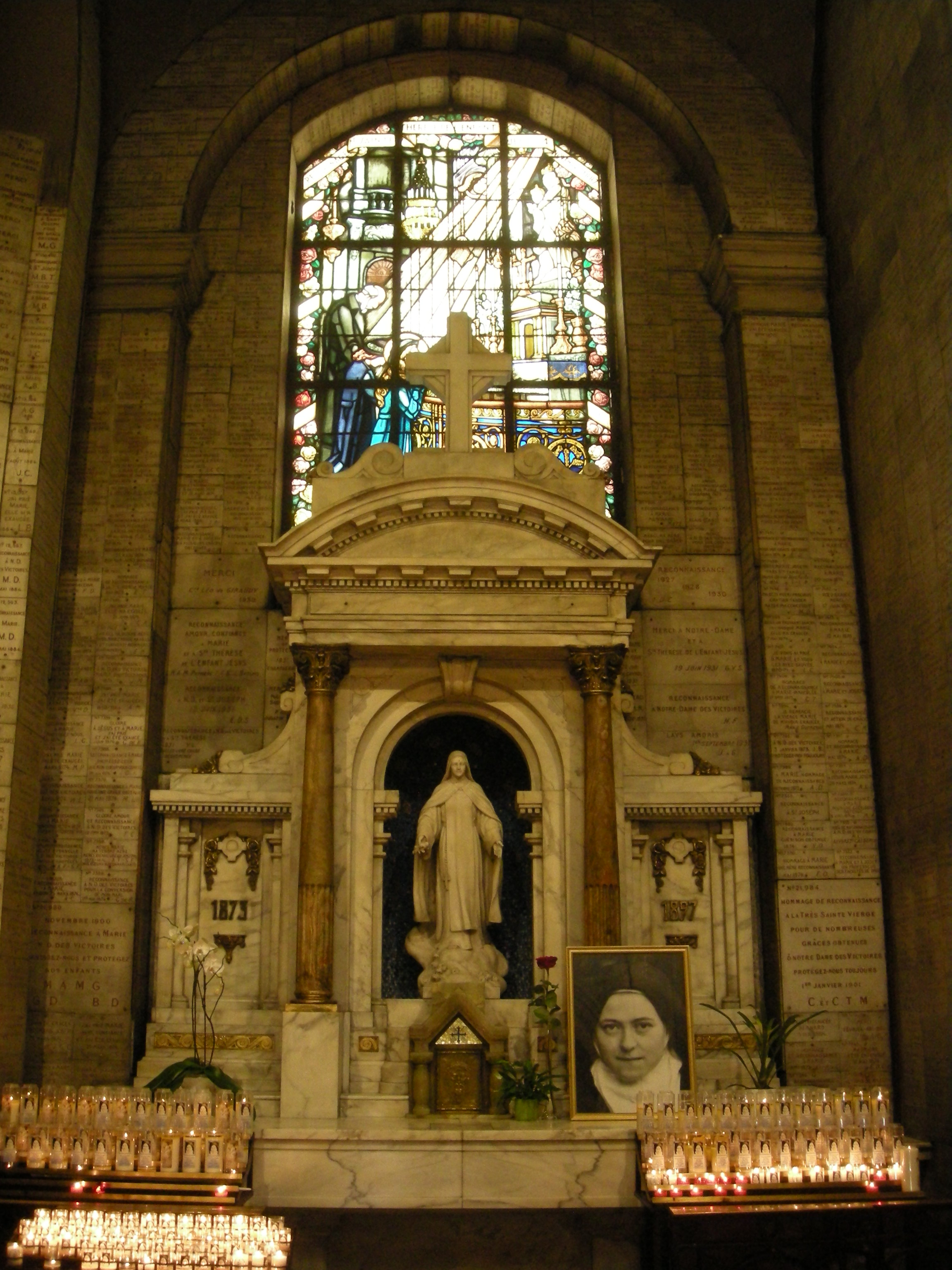
Gallery of Thérèse of Lisieux

- The Chapel of the Sacred Heart features a bas-relief depicting the appearance of Christ and the Sacred Heart to Marguerite-Marie Alacoque at Paray-le-Monail in France in the 19th century. The sculpture was made by Jacquier (1870).

-The Chapel of Notre-Dame of the Seven Sorrows features a Pieta of Christ and the crucified Christ, made of the stone of Caen by Charles Gonthier (1876).

- The Chapel of Saint Augustine presents a statue of the Saint, in plaster, by Jean-Bernard Duseigneur (1849). It took the place of an earlier statue by Jean-Baptiste Pigalle which disappeared during the French Revolution. Above this chapel is another large-scale coloured stained glass windows, "The Vow of Louis XIII", showing the King promising the construction of a church to the Virgin Mary.

A more recent Saint, Thérèse of Lisieux (1873–1897), a young French Carmelite nun of the 19th century, popularly known in English as "The Little Flower of Jesus", is honored in the Chapel of Saint Therese.

== Ex votos ==
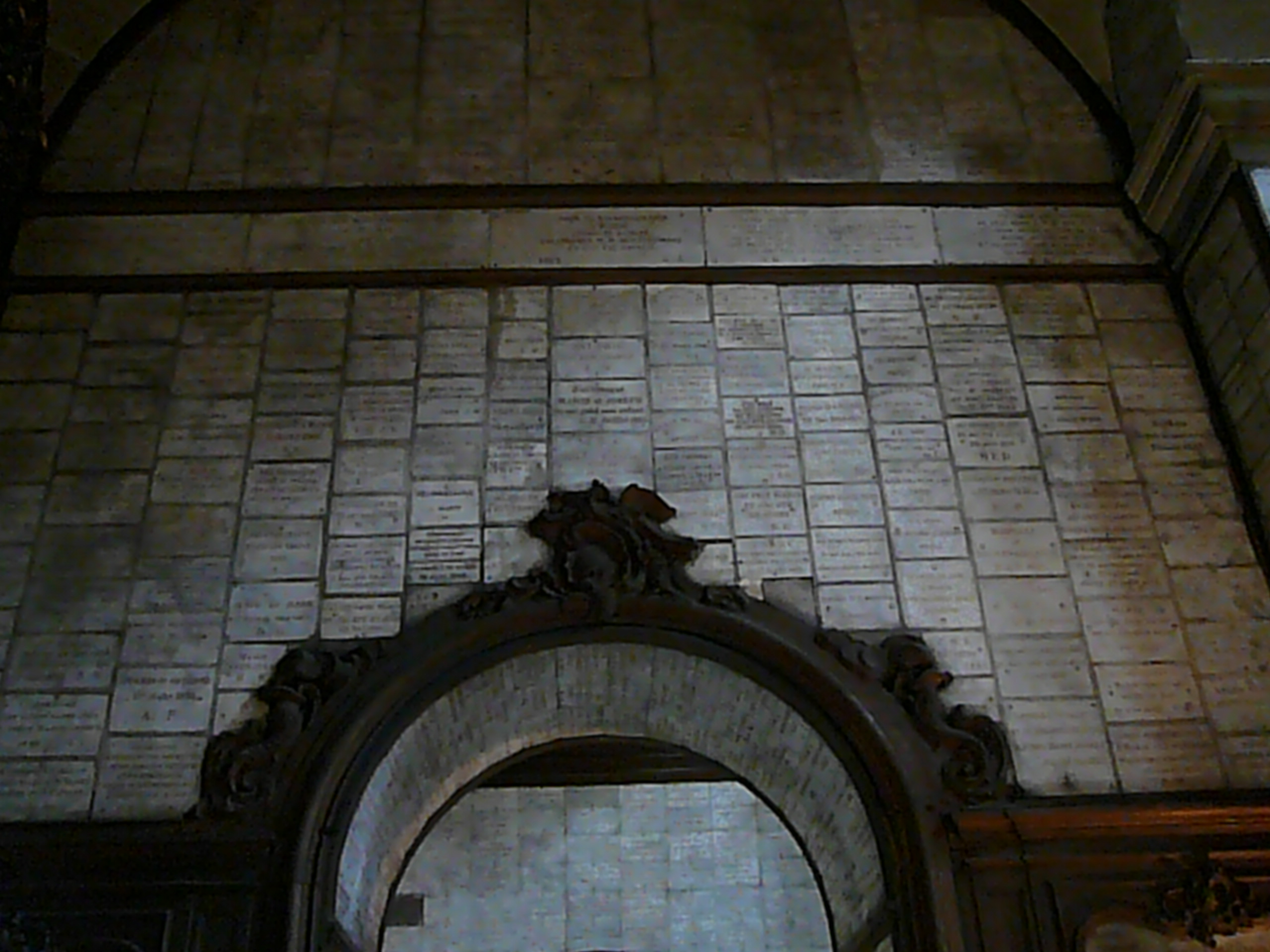

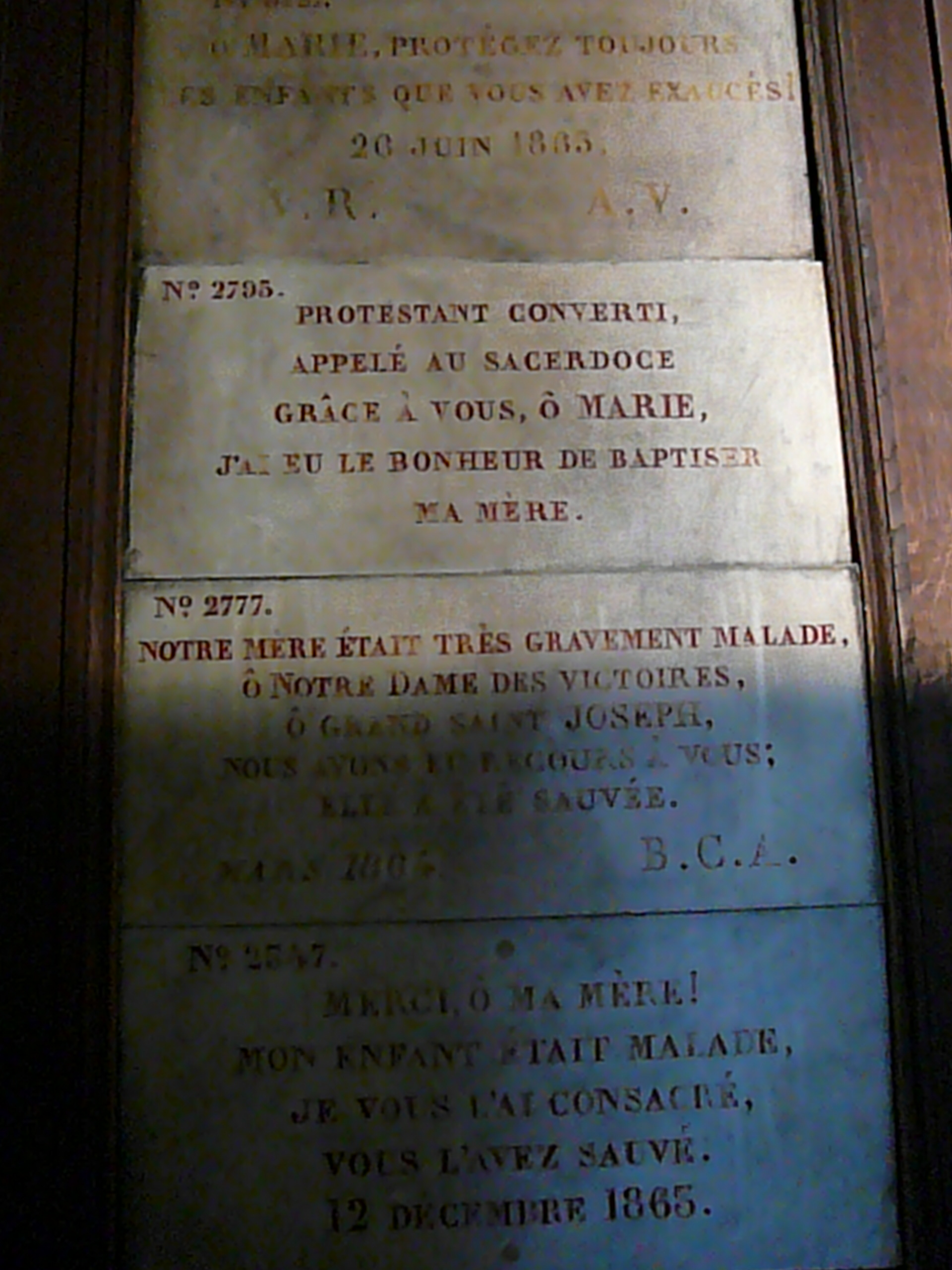

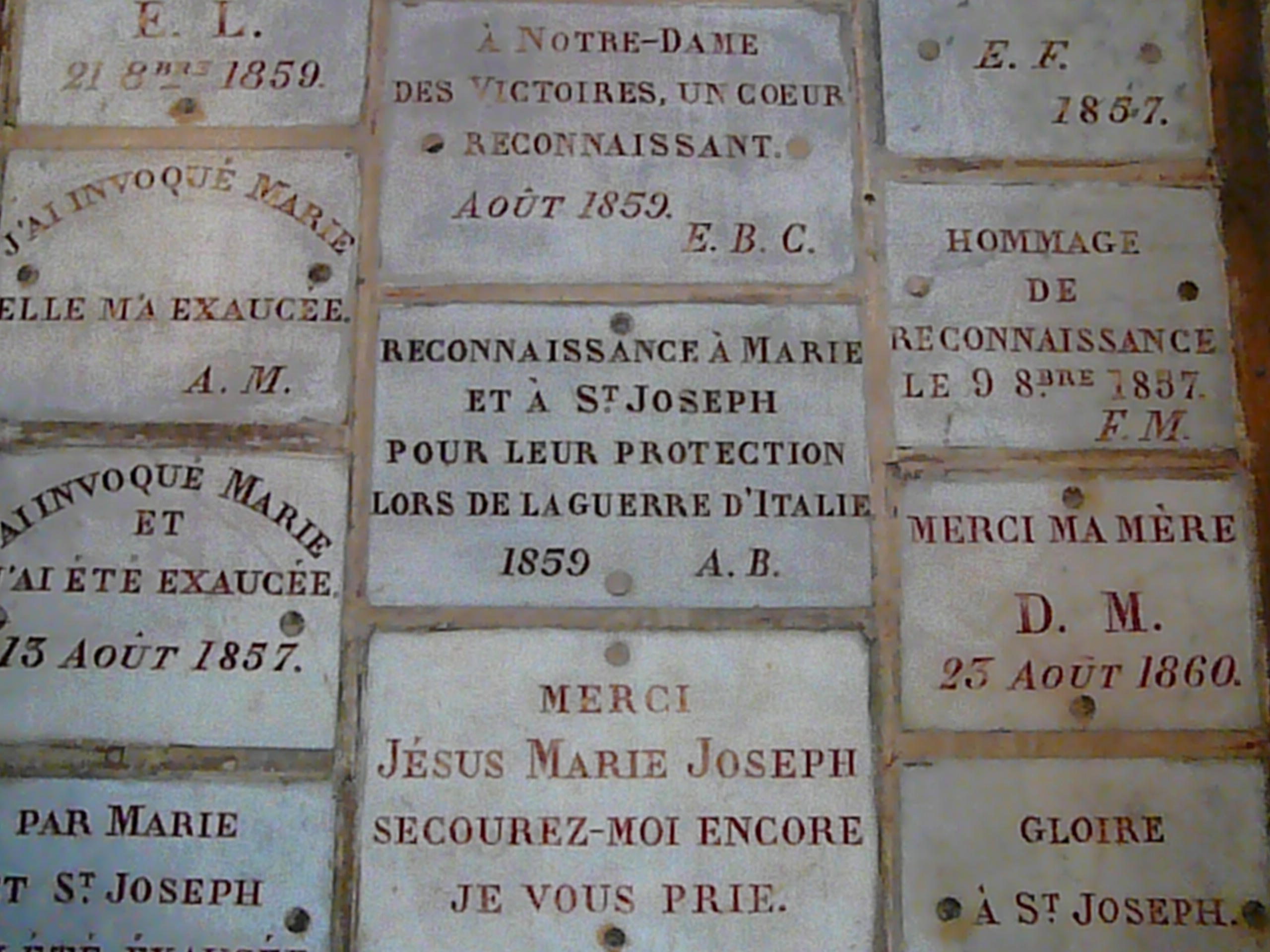

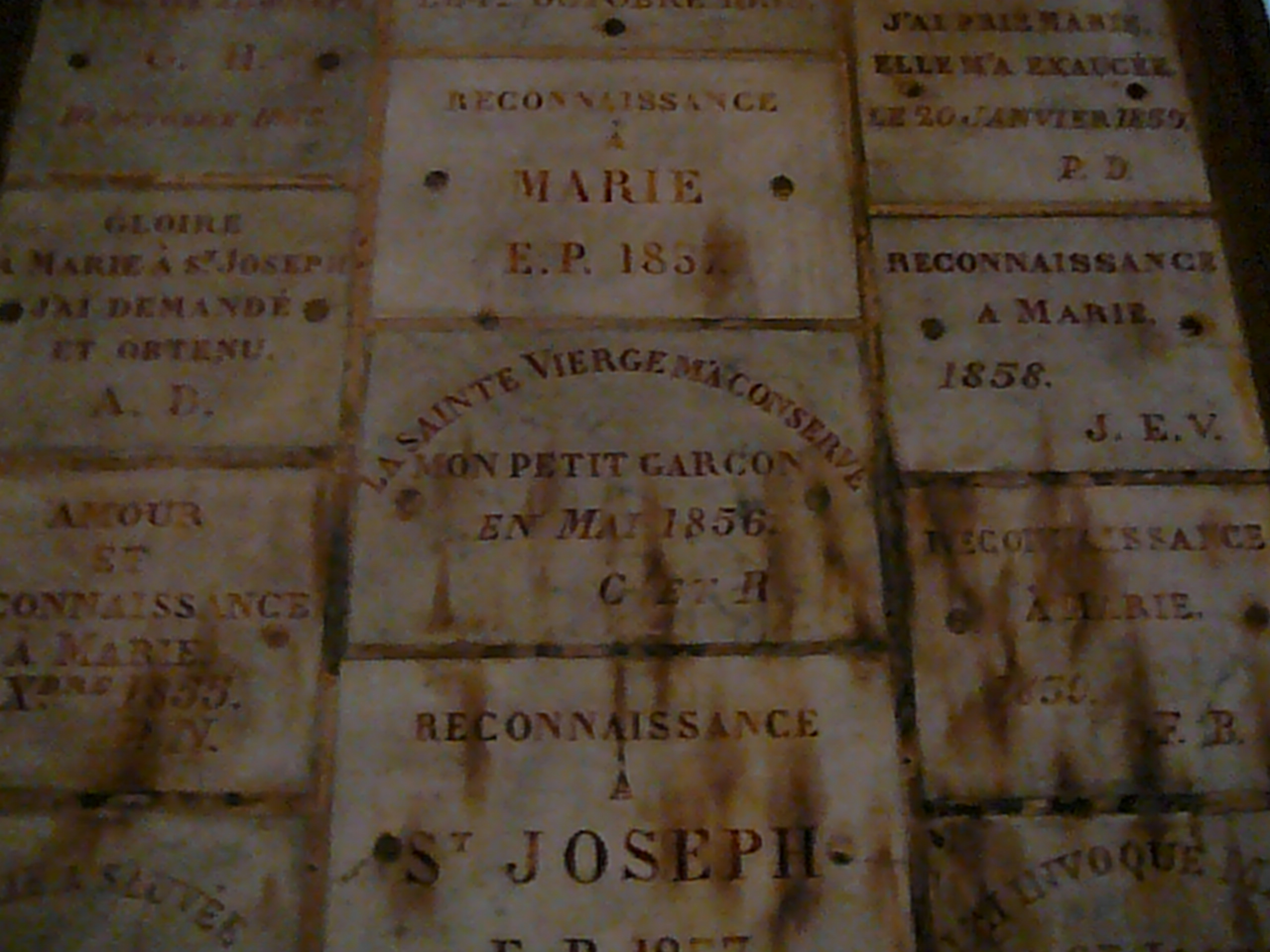

Notre-Dame-des-Victoires is unique among Paris churches in its display of ex-voto offering left their by faithful parishioners, thanking the Virgin Mary for blessings they have received. It currently displays over thirty-seven thousand devotional plaques which cover most of the walls, as well as silver and gold hearts and military decorations. Over 37,000 devotional plaques, silver and gold hearts, as well The basilica once served as a stational church along the pilgrimage route to Compostela. As such, many of the ex voto offerings were left by faithful unable to make the long journey to the Shrine of Compostela itself.

== Stained Glass ==
The stained glass of the church dates to the second half of the 19th century. The eight windows on the upper of the nave were made with decorative patterns of grisaille, designed to provide a maximum of light, with colorful figures of saints associated with the Virgin in the center. In summer, the portal doors were also left open, to bring more light inside.

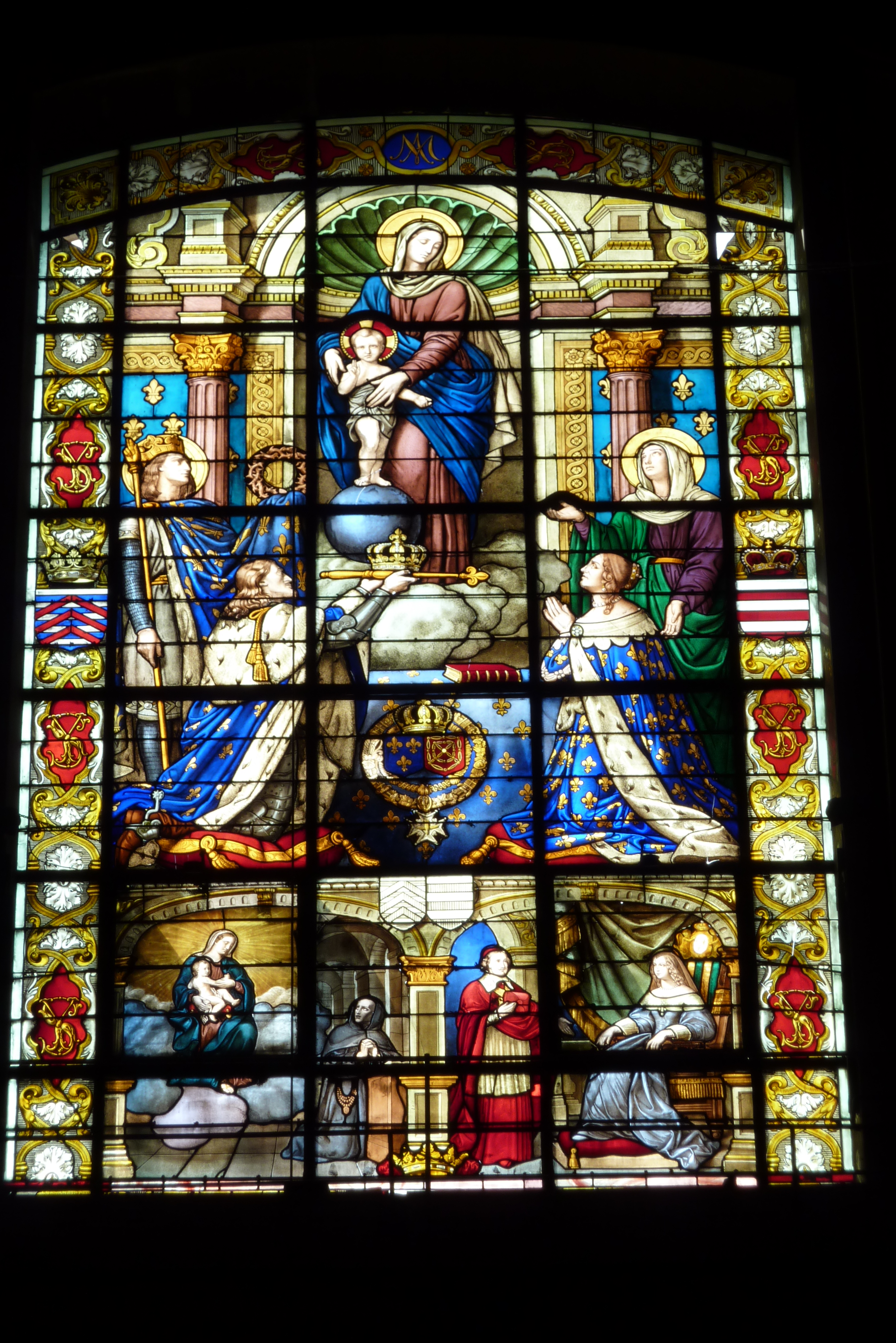
Louis XIII and the Queen promise to build a church to honour the Virgin Mary

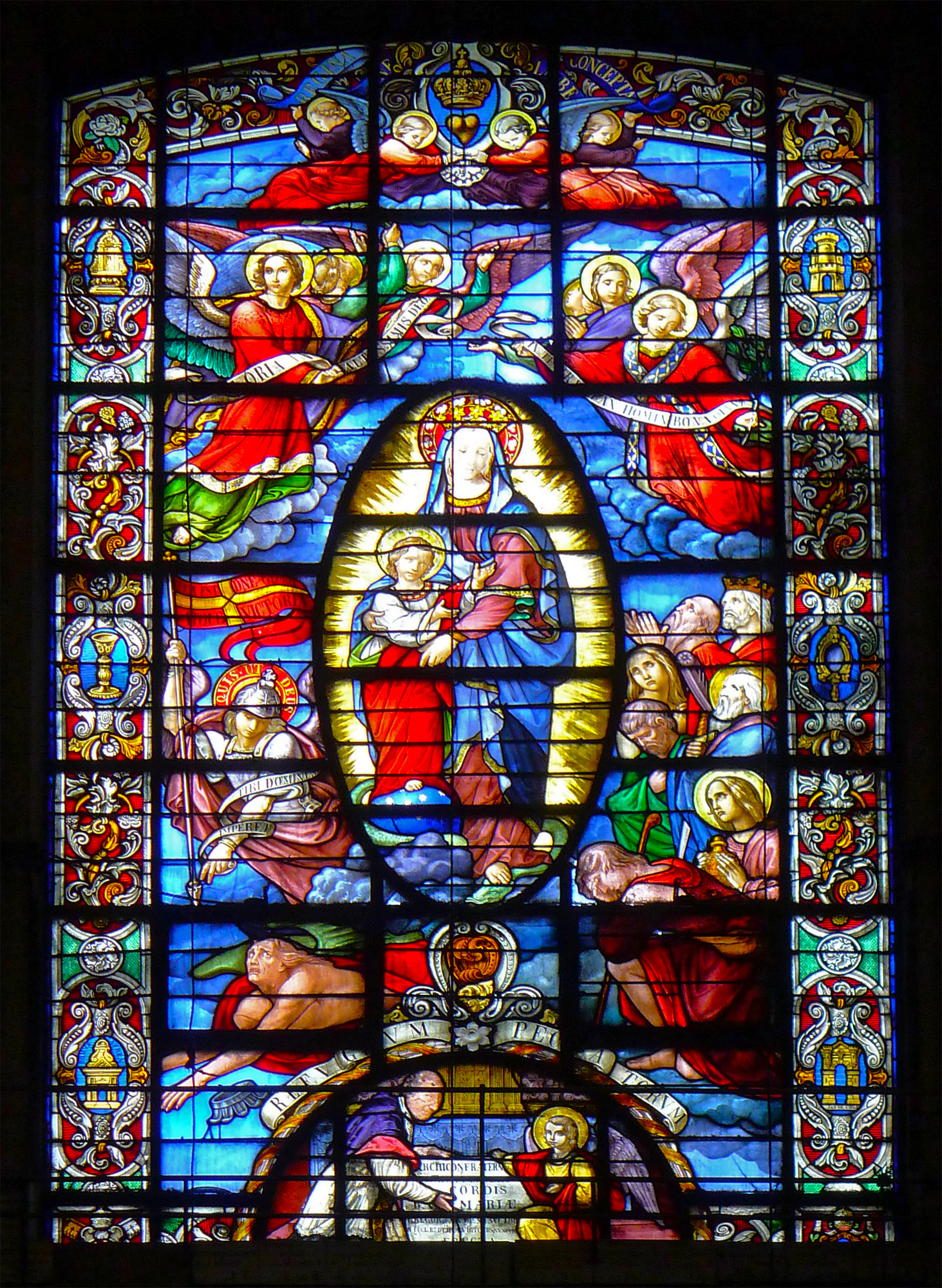
Virgin and Child

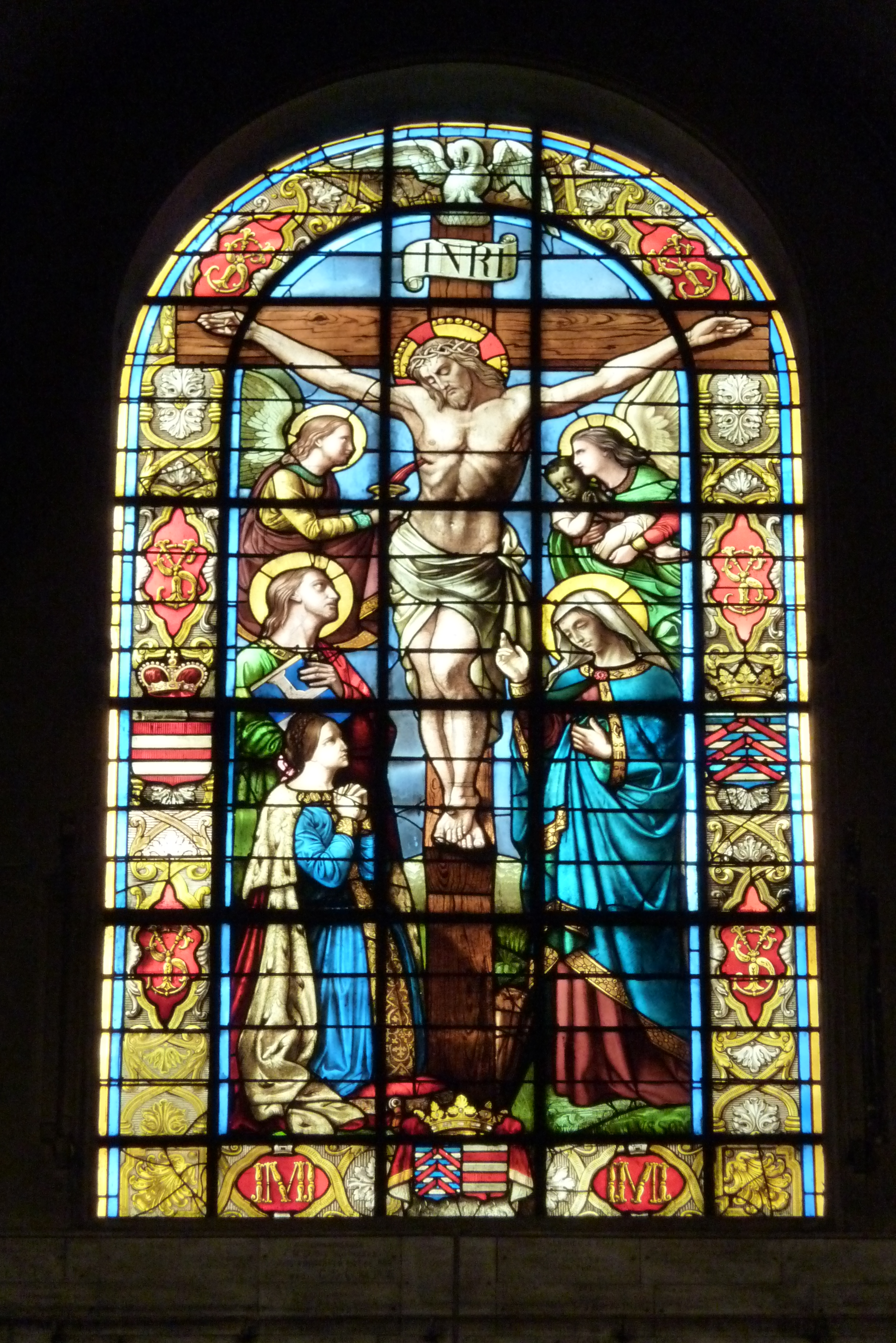
The Crucifixion

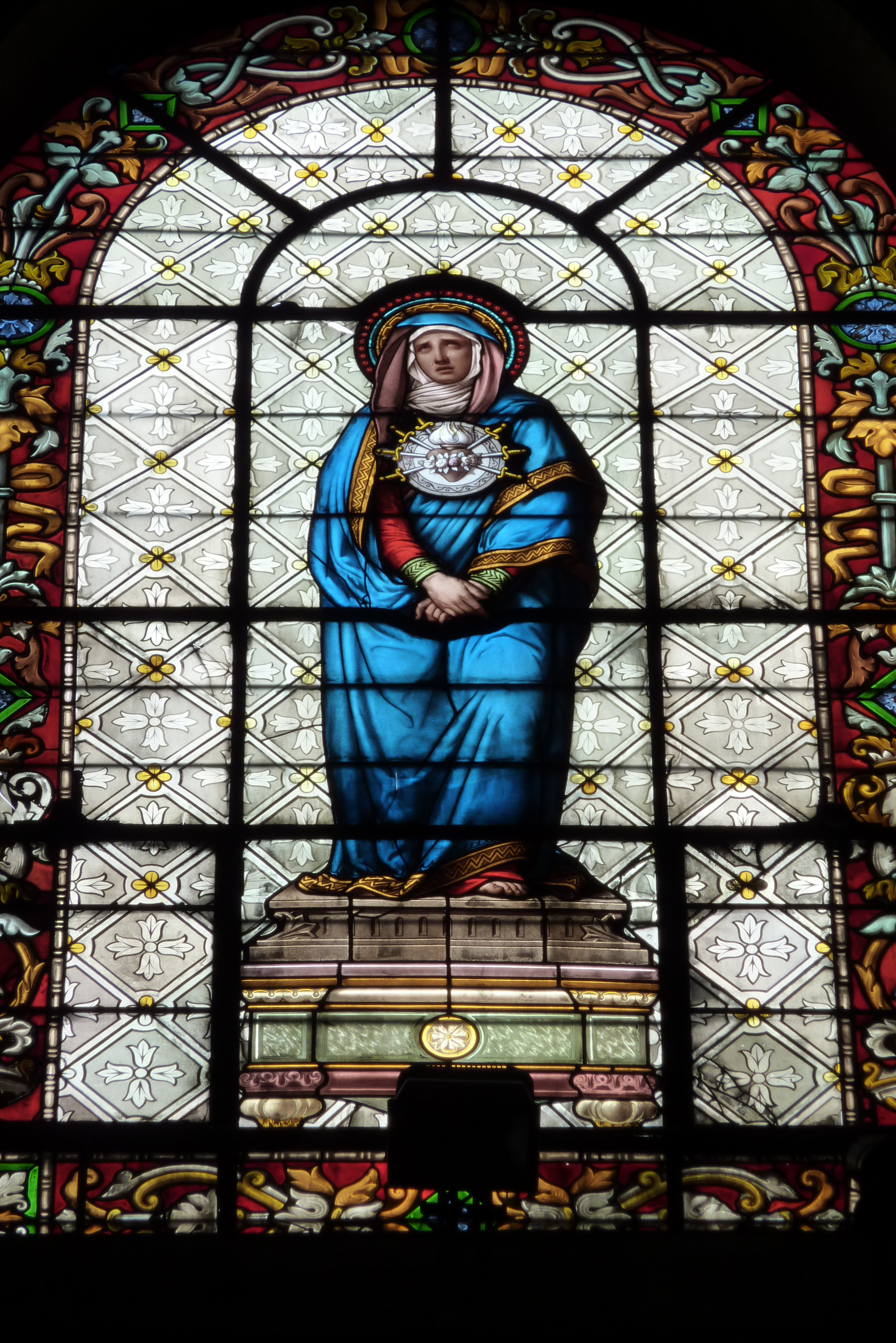
The Seven Sorrows of the Virgin Mary

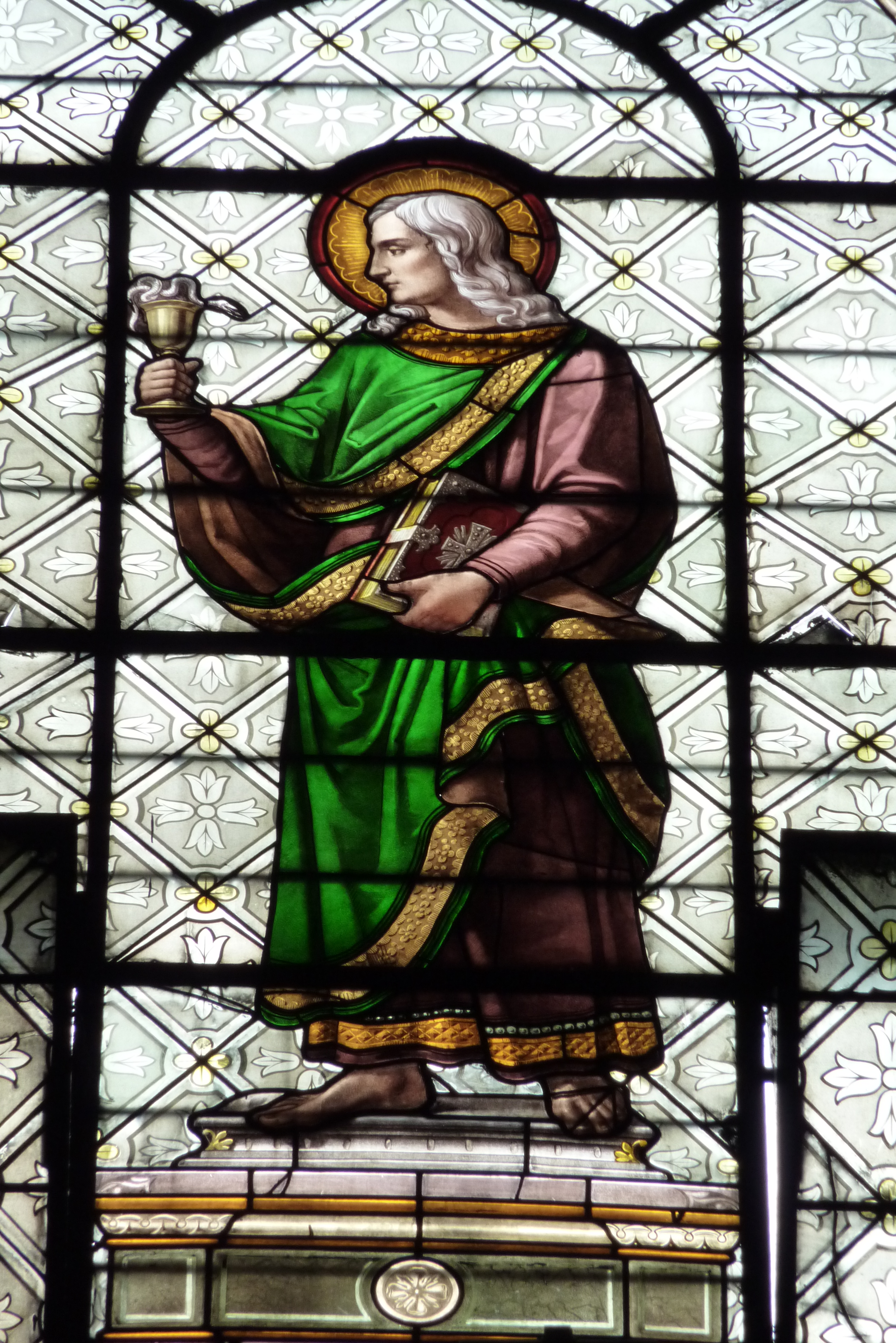
The Apostle John

== Art and Decoration ==
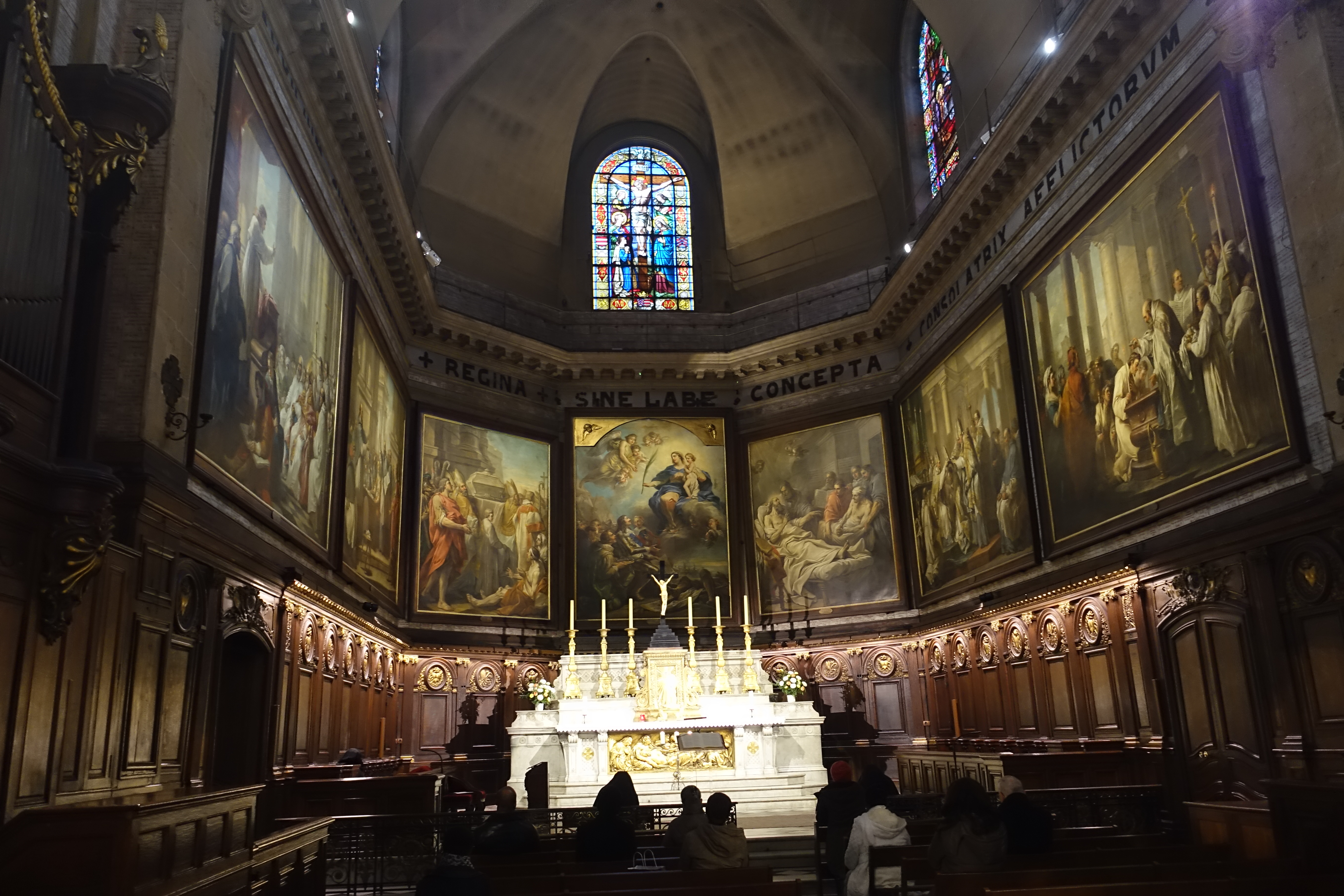
The Choir and Altar, paintings by Charles-André van Loo, and stalls for the clergy

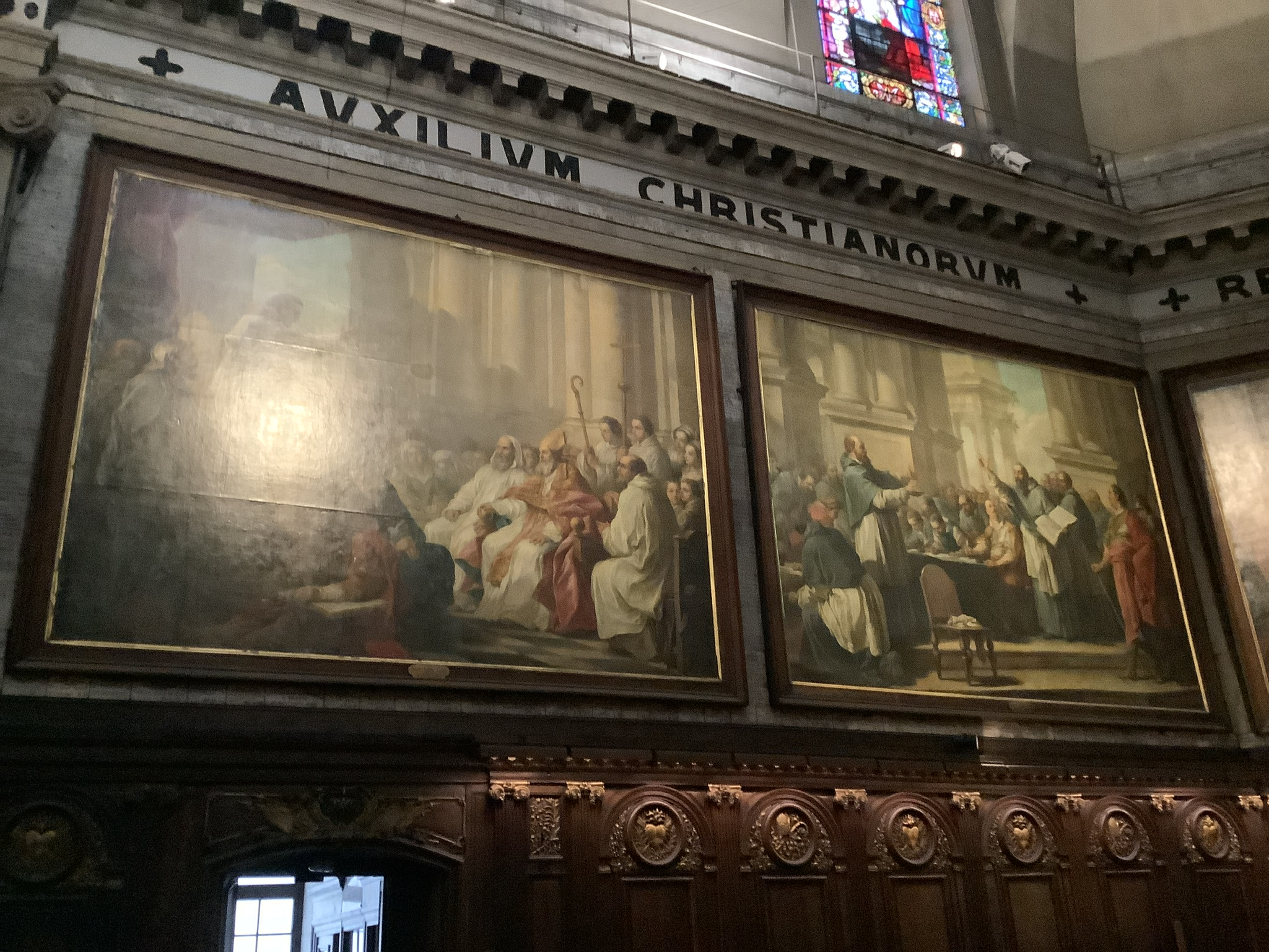
Scenes from life of Saint Augustine by Charles-André van Loo (left side behind altar)

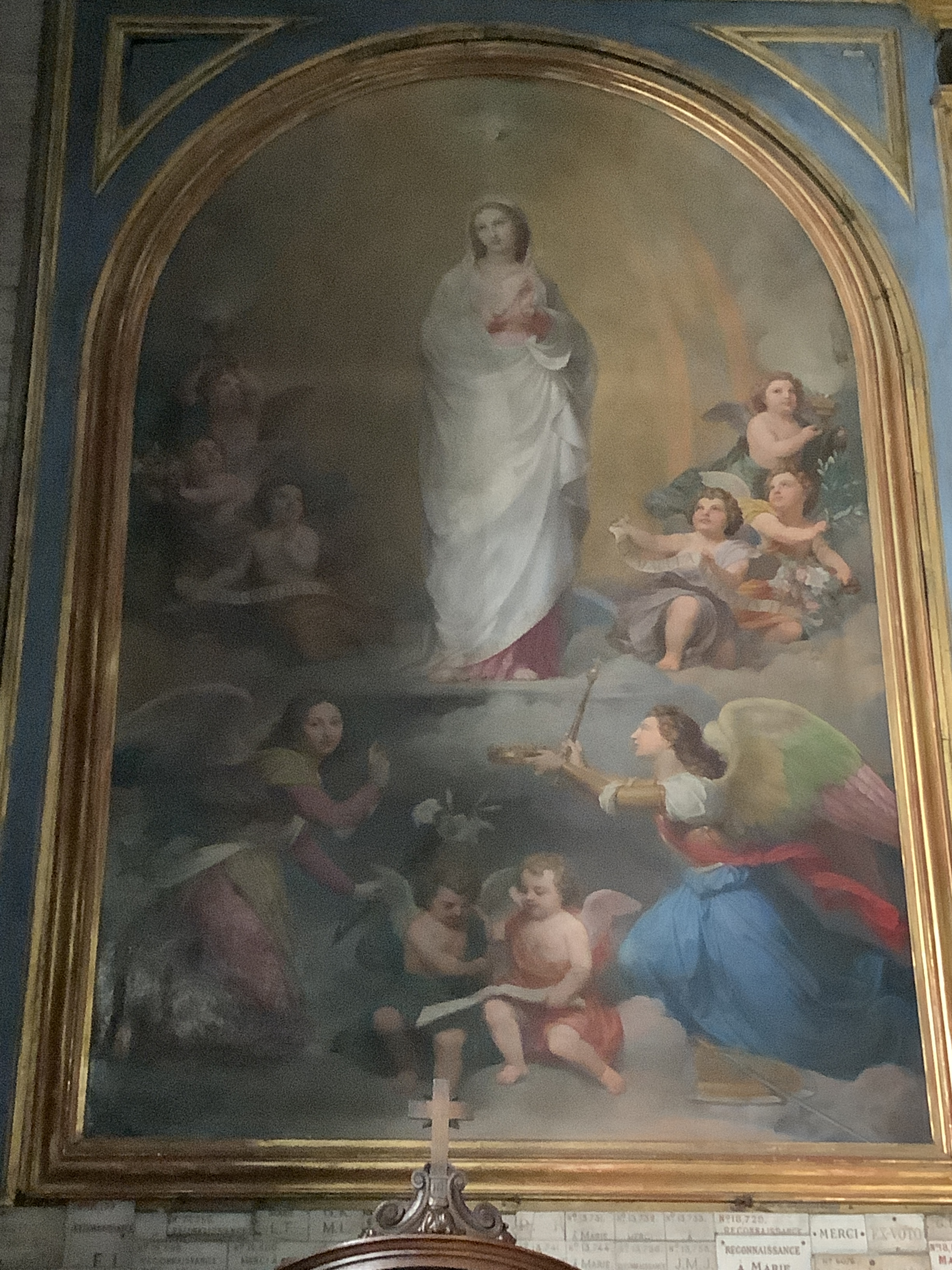
"The Immaculate Conception" by Jules Pasqualini (1820–1886)

The most notable artistic decoration of the choir is a group of seven large paintings behind the altar by Charles-André van Loo (1705–1765), which are considered among the most important French religious art works of the 18th century. The central painting depicts "Louis XIII dedicating Notre-Dame-des-Victoires to the Virgin Mary", holding a palm in one hand as a sign of his victories over the Protestants, and showing the Virgin the plan for the future church. The other paintings behind th altar depict scenes from the life of Saint Augustine.

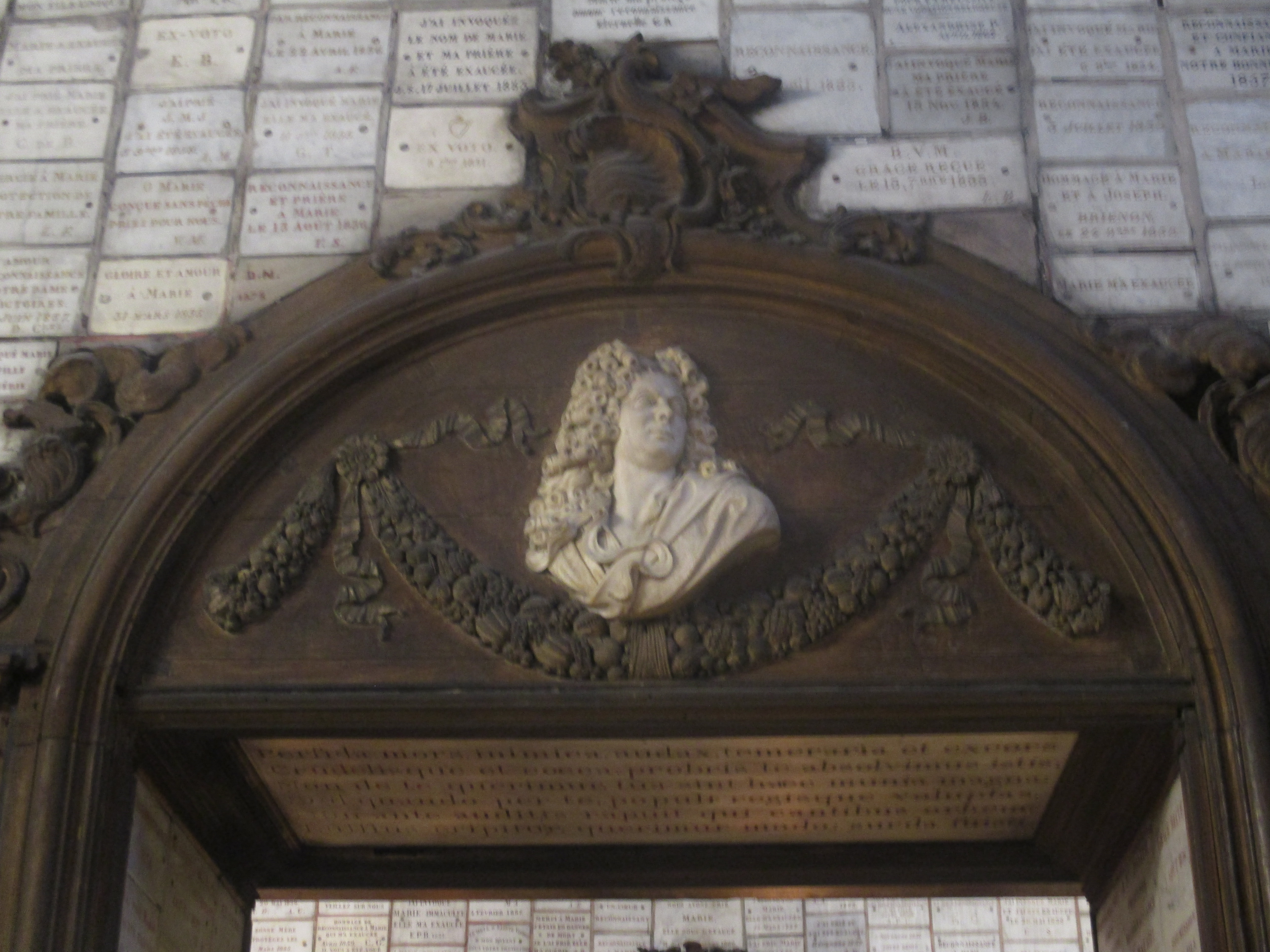
Bust of composer Jean-Baptiste Lully attributed to the court sculptor Antoine Coysevox

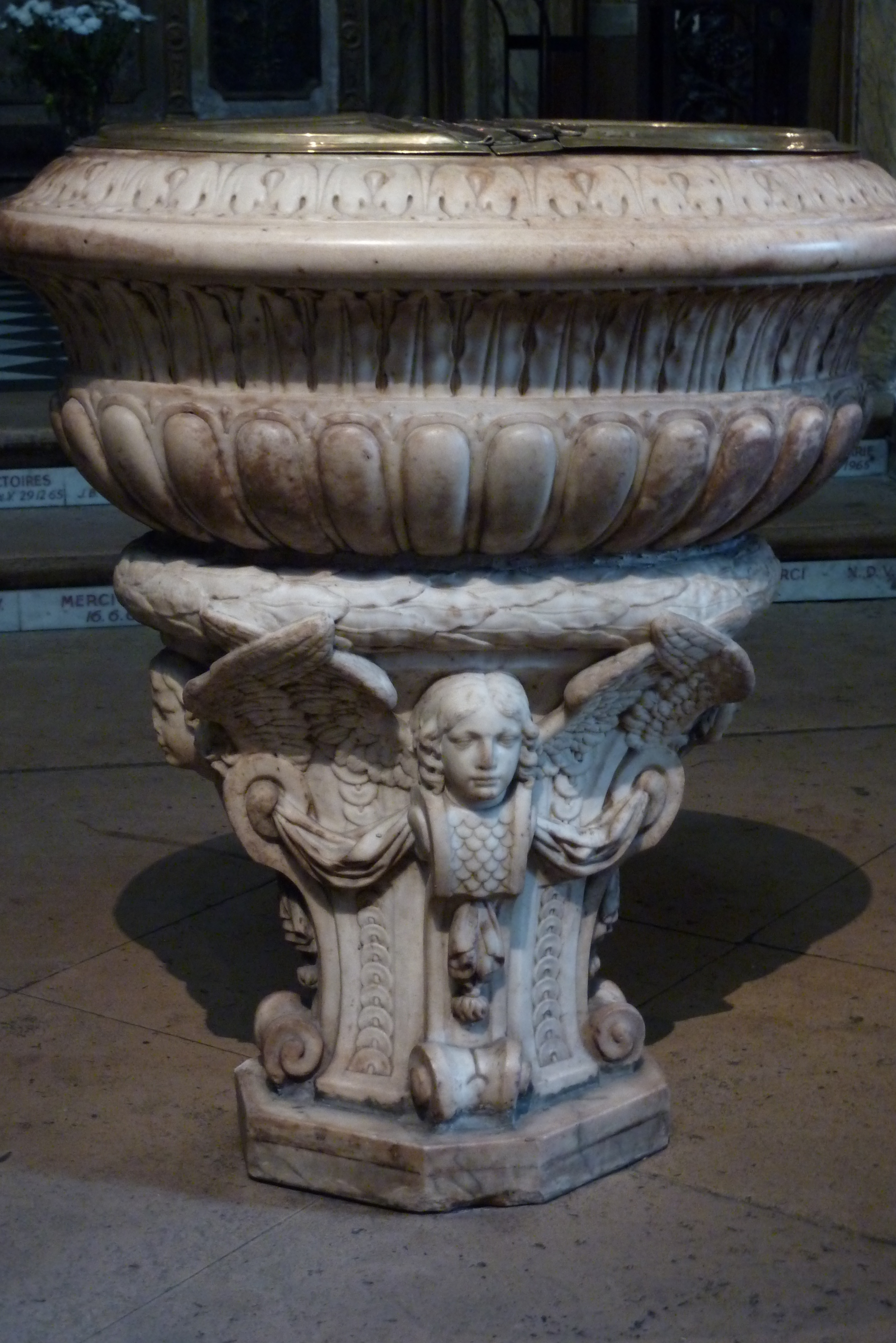
Marble Baptismal Font (17th century)

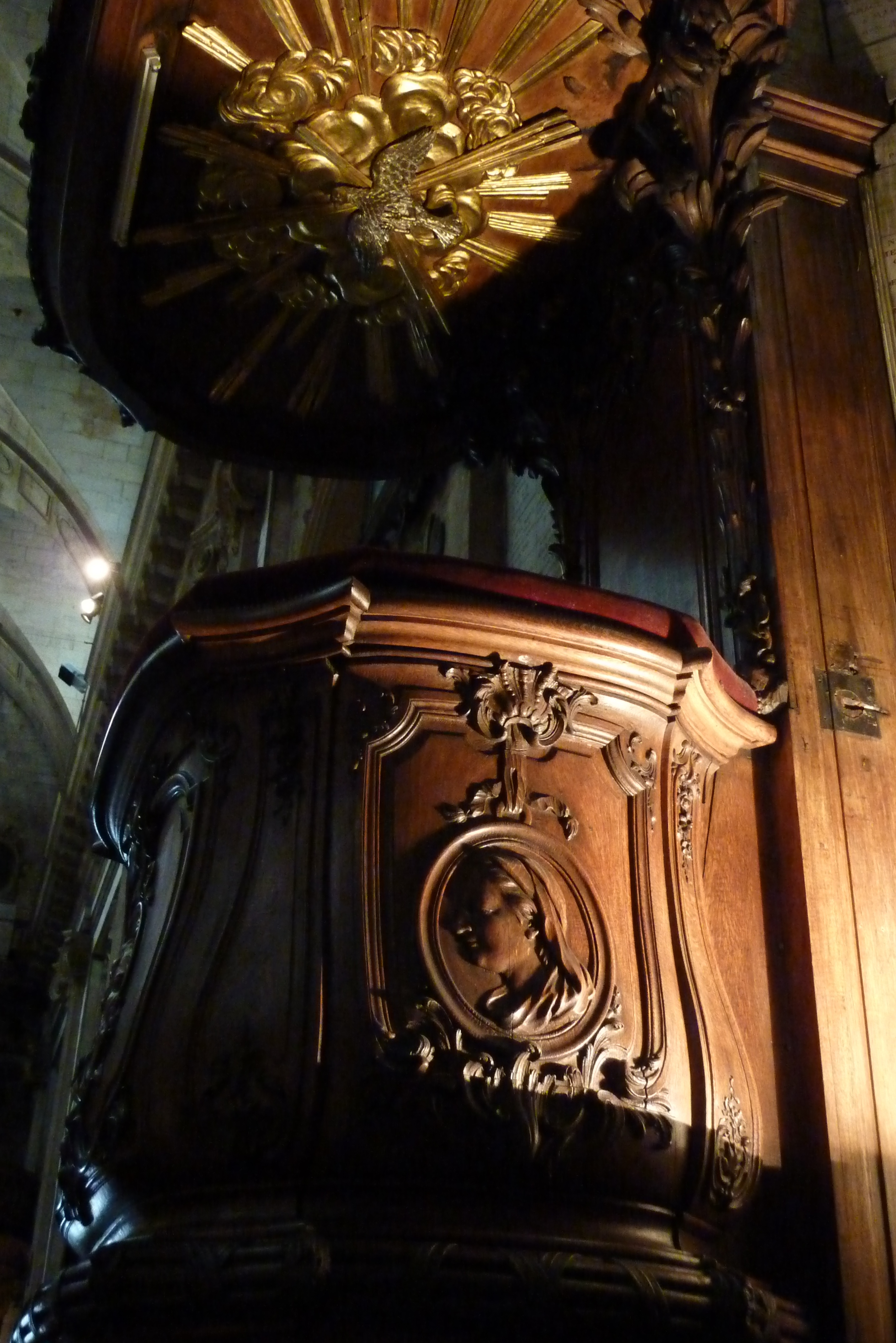
The pulpit by Louis Regnier (18th c.)

The church interior contains a cenotaph, a portion of the tomb of Jean-Baptiste Lully, court composer for Louis XIV and collaborator of Moliere. His home was in the parish, and his tomb, made by Pierre Cotton, was placed there in 1687. The tomb was destroyed during the Paris Commune, but some portions survived and are now displayed between the Chapel of Saint John and the Chapel of the Sacred Infant. There are two busts of Lully there, a bronze bust on top by Jean Collignon, and a 17th-century bust attributed to the court sculptor Antoine Coysevox, whose work has a prominent place at the Palace of Versailles.

The elaborate carvings on the pulpit were made by Louis Regnier, who also created the decorative carvings surrounding the organ case.

== Organ ==
The pipe organ on the tribune over the entrance of the church was constructed by François-Henri Lesclop in 1739, with modifications and additions by Barker in 1870, Abbey in 1898, and Kern in 1973. The case of the organ was made by Louis Regnier in 1739. It features elaborate carved sculpture of vases, angels and musical instruments. He also made the carved decoration found on the pulpit of the church.

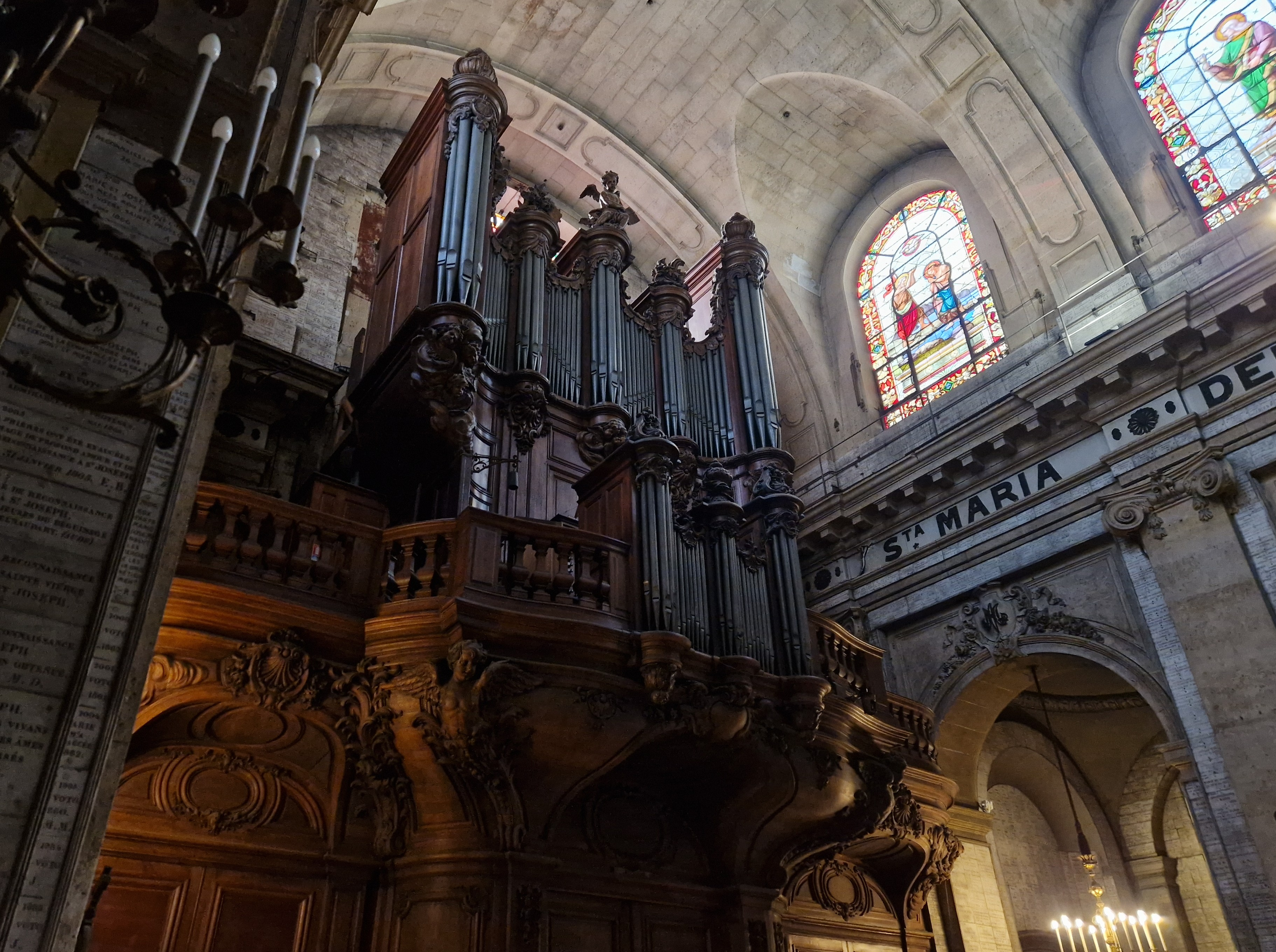
1739 Lesclop organ

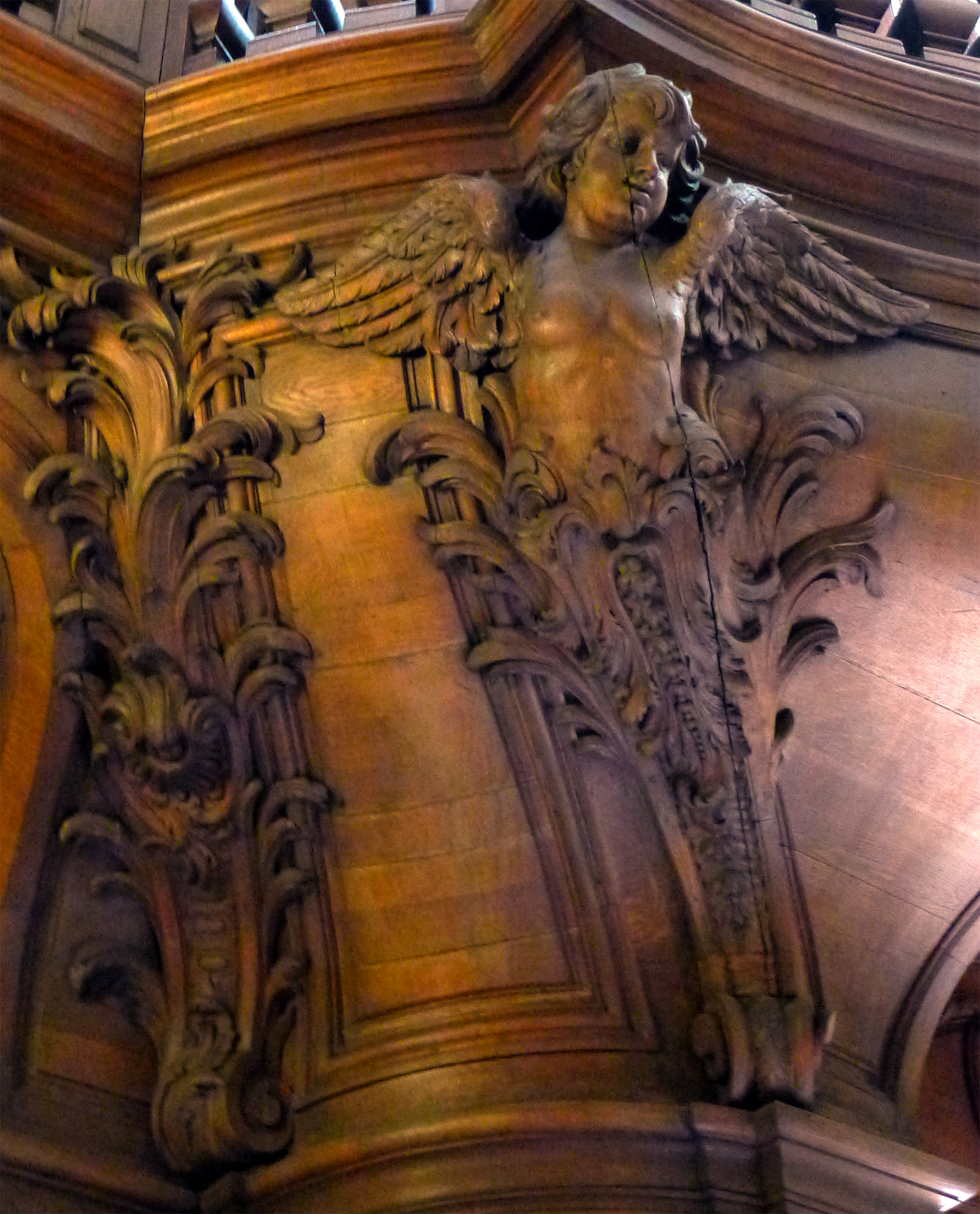
Detail of the carved decoration of the organ

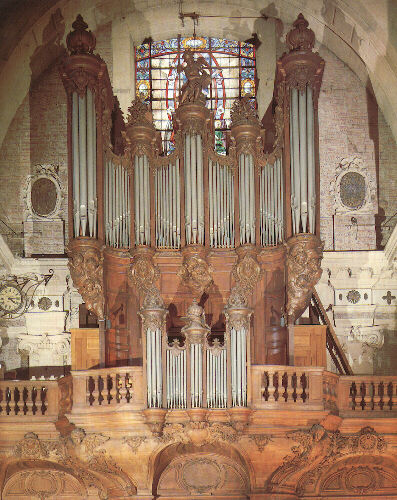
Organ of the tribune

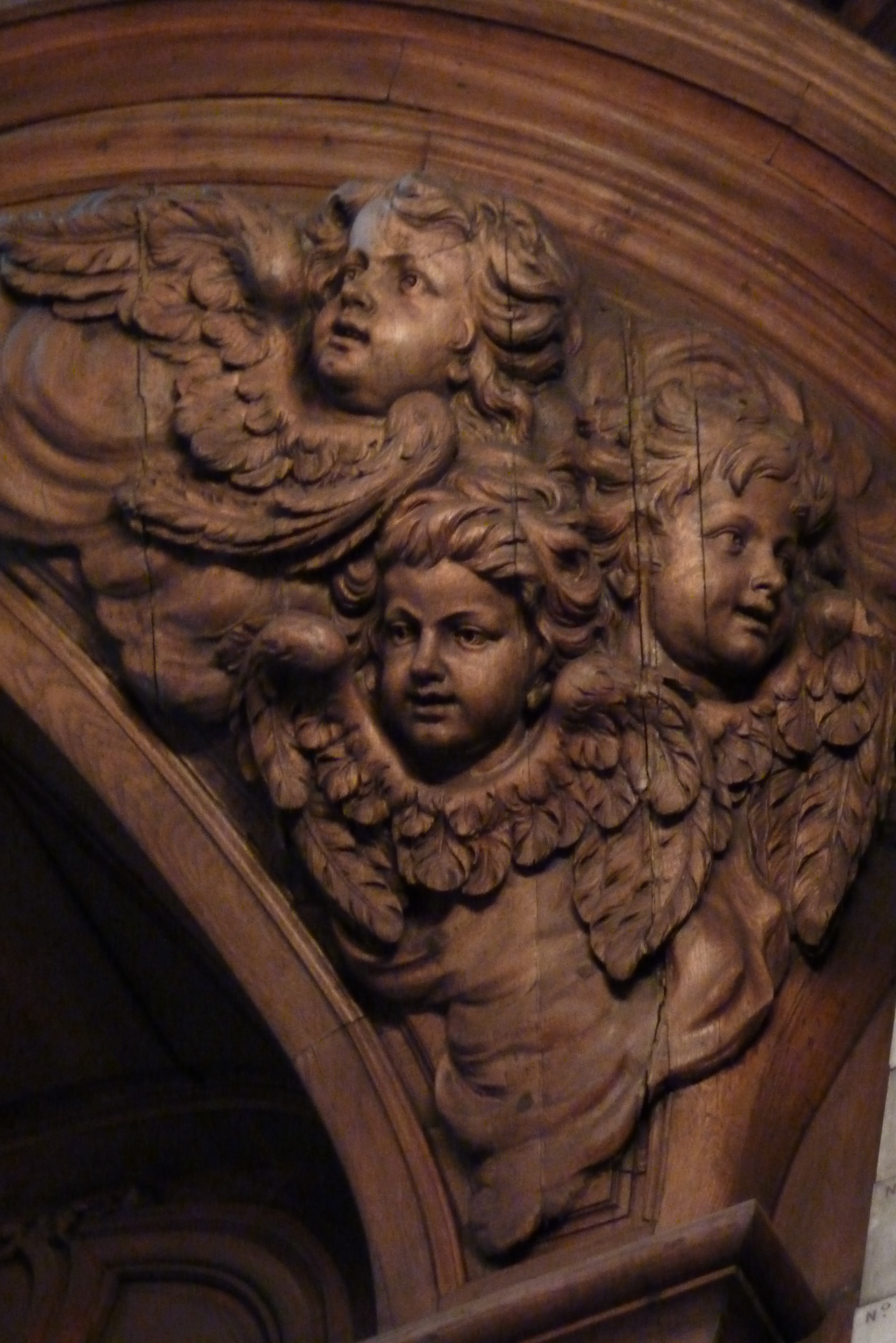
Carved decoration around the organ
