= Dufriche-Desgenettes =

Dufriche-Desgenettes or Dufriche Desgenettes is a surname. Notable people with the surname include:

- Antoni Dufriche-Desgenettes (1804–1878), French phonetician
- René-Nicolas Dufriche Desgenettes (1762–1837), French military doctor
