= Ivan Meštrović =

Croatian sculptor and architect (1883–1962)

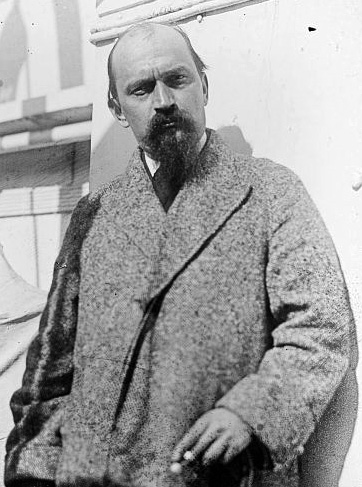
- Meštrović in 1928
- Born: 15 August 1883; Vrpolje, Croatia-Slavonia, Austria-Hungary (modern Croatia)
- Died: 16 January 1962 (aged 78); South Bend, Indiana, U.S.
- Resting place: Otavice, Croatia
- Education: Academy of Fine Arts Vienna
- Known for: Sculptor, architect
- Notable work: Well of Life (1905); The Bowman and The Spearman (1928); Pietà (1946); Pobednik (1913); St. Jerome the Priest (1954)
- Movement: Art Nouveau, symbolism, Vienna Secession
- Spouses: Ruža Klein (m. 1907; div. 1925) Olga Kesterčanek (m. 1928)
- Children: 4, including Mate Meštrović
- Relatives: Stjepan Meštrović (grandson)
- Awards: American Academy of Arts and Letters Gold Medal (1956)

Ivan Meštrović (Croatian: [ǐʋan mɛ̂ʃtrɔʋit͡ɕ]; 15 August 1883 – 16 January 1962) was a Croatian sculptor, architect, and writer. He was the most prominent modern Croatian sculptor and a leading artistic personality in contemporary Zagreb. He studied at Pavao Bilinić's Stone Workshop in Split and at the Academy of Fine Arts Vienna, where he was formed under the influence of the Secession. He traveled throughout Europe and studied the works of ancient and Renaissance masters, especially Michelangelo, and French sculptors Auguste Rodin, Antoine Bourdelle and Aristide Maillol. He was the initiator of the national-romantic group Medulić (he advocated the creation of art of national features inspired by the heroic folk songs). During the First World War, he lived in emigration. After the war, he returned to Croatia and began a long and fruitful period of sculpture and pedagogical work. In 1942 he emigrated to Italy, in 1943 to Switzerland and in 1947 to the United States. He was a professor of sculpture at Syracuse University and from 1955 at the University of Notre Dame in South Bend, Indiana.

Most of his early works of symbolic themes were formed in the spirit of the Secession, some of which, like the Well of Life, show impressionist restless surfaces created under the influence of Rodin's naturalism, and the second, reviving national myth, become stylized monumental plastics (Kosovo cycle, 1908-1910). Before the First World War, he left pathetic epic stylization, expressing increasingly emotional states, as evidenced by the wooden reliefs of biblical themes made in a combination of Archaic, Gothic, Secessionist and Expressionist styles. During the 1920s and 1930s, the classical component prevailed in his works. In this period, he created a number of public monuments of strong plastic expression, pronounced and legible shapes (Gregory of Nin and Marko Marulić in Split, Andrija Medulić, Andrija Kačić-Miošić and Josip Juraj Strossmayer in Zagreb, Pobednik in Belgrade, Svetozar Miletić in Novi Sad and The Bowman and The Spearman in Chicago). Portraits take a special place in his opus.

Meštrović achieved works of strong plastic value in the construction-sculptural monuments and projects, mostly with central layout (the Mausoleum of the Račić family in Cavtat, the Mausoleum of the Meštrović family in Otavice, the Meštrović Pavilion in Zagreb, Monument to the Unknown Hero in Belgrade). He also designed a memorial church of King Zvonimir in Biskupija near Knin inspired by old Croatian churches, a representative family palace, today the Ivan Meštrović Gallery, and reconstructed renaissance fortified mansion Crikvine-Kaštilac in Split.

== Life ==
=== Early life ===
He was born in Vrpolje, Slavonia, and spent his childhood in the small Dalmatian village of Otavice, the native place of his parents in the Dinaric Alps. His father was a poor peasant and sheep-breeder. At the age of sixteen he was accepted as an apprentice by Pavle Bilinić, a master of a stonemasonry in Split.

His artistic skills were improved by studying the monumental buildings in the city and his education at the hands of Bilinić's wife, who was a high-school teacher. Soon, they found a mine owner from Vienna who paid for Meštrović to move there and be admitted to the Academy of Fine Arts where he studied under Edmund von Hellmer and Otto Wagner. Quickly he had to learn German from scratch and adjust to the new environment, but he persevered and successfully finished his studies.

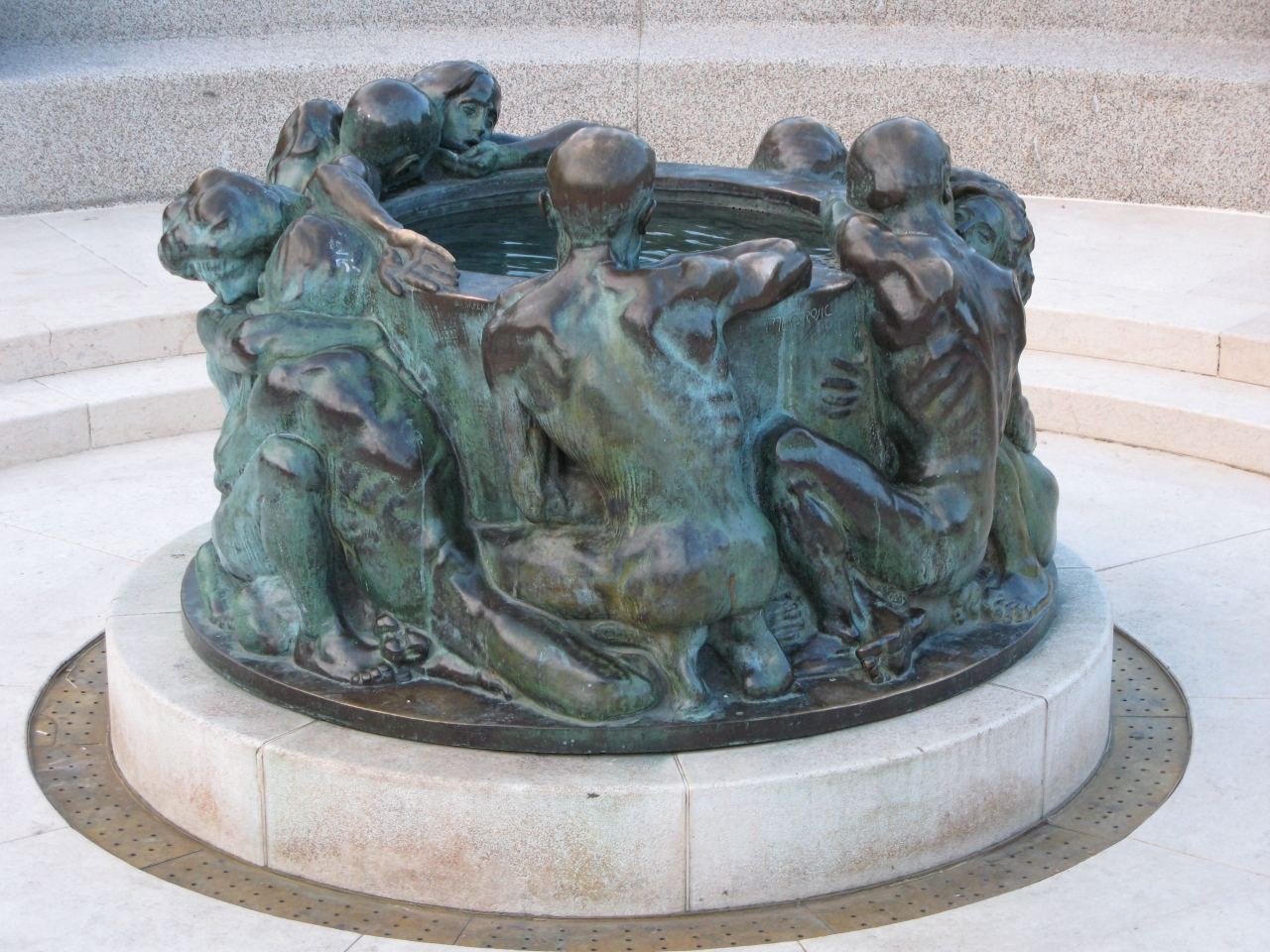
Well of Life (1905), fountain in front of Croatian National Theatre in Zagreb

In 1905 he had his first exhibit with the Secession Group in Vienna, noticeably influenced by the Art Nouveau style. His work quickly became popular, even with the likes of Auguste Rodin who once said that Meštrović is the greatest phenomenon among sculptors and even greater sculptor than he was. Because of that popularity he soon earned enough for him and his wife (since 1904), Ruža Klein, to travel to more international exhibitions.

In 1908 Meštrović moved to Paris and the sculptures made in this period earned him international reputation. At this time, Ivan was a friend of the cubist painter Jelena Dorotka (Helene Dorotka von Ehrenwall). In 1911 he moved to Zagreb, and soon after to Rome where he received the grand prix for the Serbian Pavilion on the 1911 Rome International Exhibition. There his work was praised as being strong and monumental compared to the "soft and ineffectual" pieces exhibited by his contemporaries, Hugo Lederer, Anton Hanak, and Franz Metzner. He remained in Rome, spending four years studying ancient Greek sculpture.

Meštrović became a supporter of Yugoslavism and Yugoslav identity after he traveled to Serbia and became impressed with Serb culture. He created a sculpture of Serbian folk-legend hero Prince Marko for the International Exhibition of Art (1911), which was exhibited along with 73 sculptures at the pavilion of Kingdom of Serbia. When asked about the statue, Meštrović replied "This Marko is our Yugoslav people with its gigantic and noble heart". Meštrović wrote poetry speaking of a "Yugoslav race". Those who knew Meštrović's views referred to him as "The Prophet of Yugoslavism". He also participated in 1911 at the Turin International.

=== First World War and Yugoslavia ===
At the onset of World War I, after the assassination in Sarajevo, Meštrović tried to move back to Split via Venice, but was dissuaded by threats made against him because of his political opposition to the Austro-Hungarian authorities. During the war he travelled to present exhibits in Paris, Cannes, London and in Switzerland. He was a founding member of the Yugoslav Committee.

He was the first artist of Croatian origin to exhibit his work at the Victoria & Albert Museum in London, in 1915.

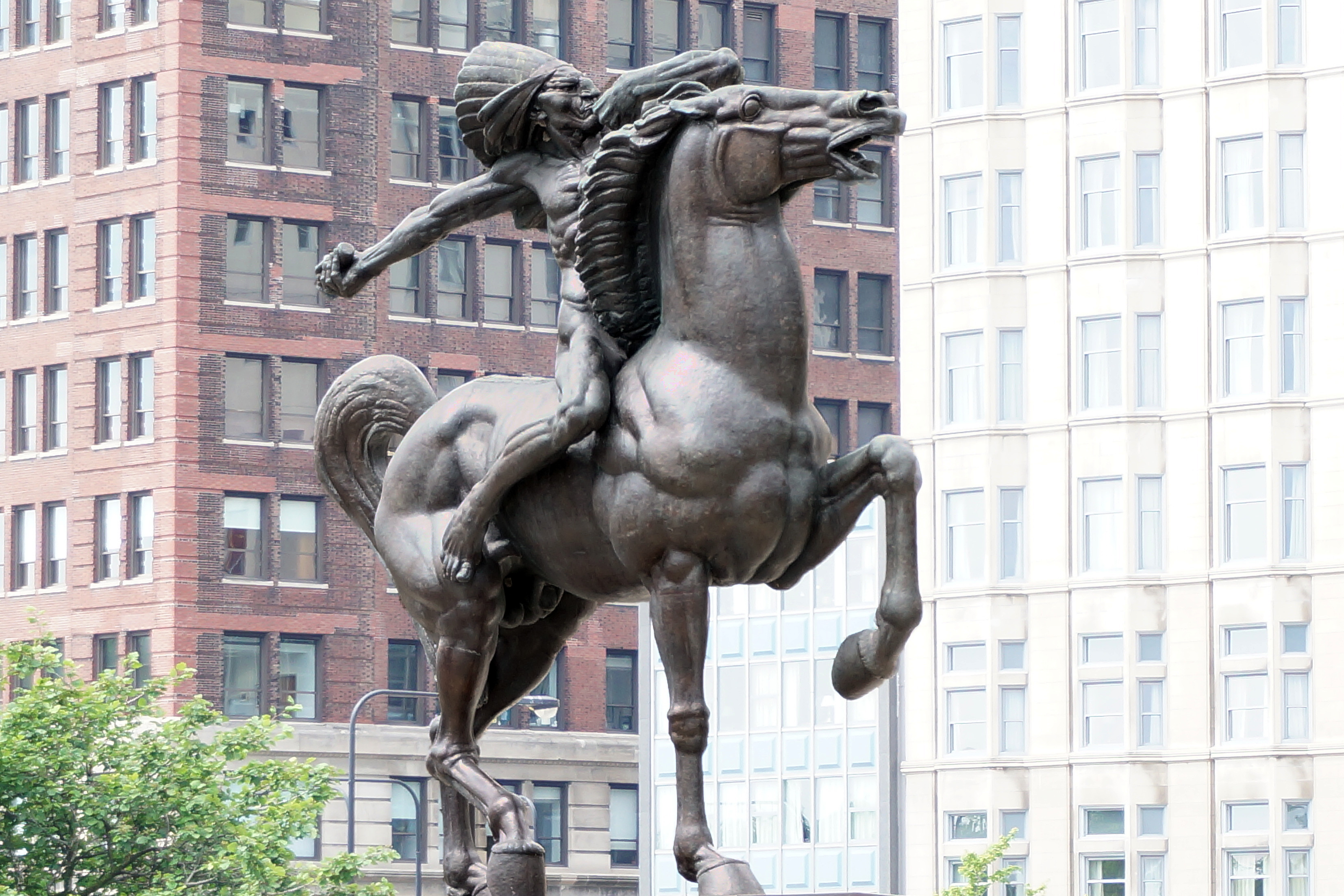
Spearman in Chicago (1928)

After World War I he moved back home to the newly formed Kingdom of Serbs, Croats and Slovenes and met the second love of his life, Olga Kesterčanek, whom he married shortly thereafter. They had four children: Marta, Tvrtko, Maria and Mate, all of whom were born in Zagreb, where Ivan and Olga settled in 1922. He was a contemporary and friend of Nikola Tesla. Meštrović and his family would later spend the winter months in their mansion in Zagreb and the summer months in a summer house he built by the end of the 1930s in Split. He became a professor and later the director of the Academy of Fine Arts in Zagreb, and proceeded to build numerous internationally renowned works as well as many donated chapels and churches and grants to art students.

By 1923 he designed the mausoleum for the Račić Family Memorial Chapel in Cavtat, also known as Our Lady of the Angels. He also created a set of statues for a never-built Yugoslav national temple that would have been erected in Kosovo to commemorate the 1389 Battle of Kosovo.

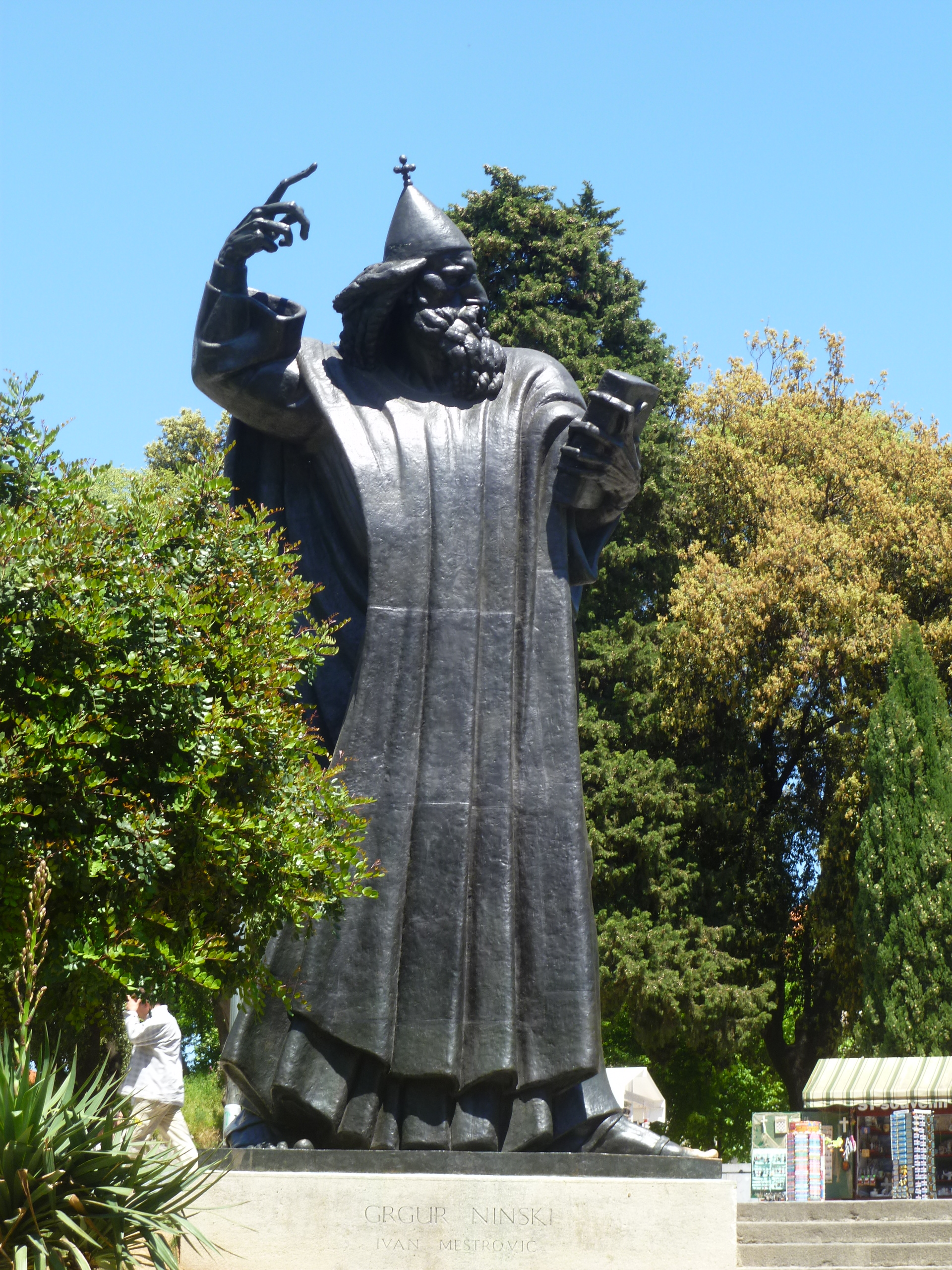
Statue of Gregory of Nin, in Split, Croatia (1929)

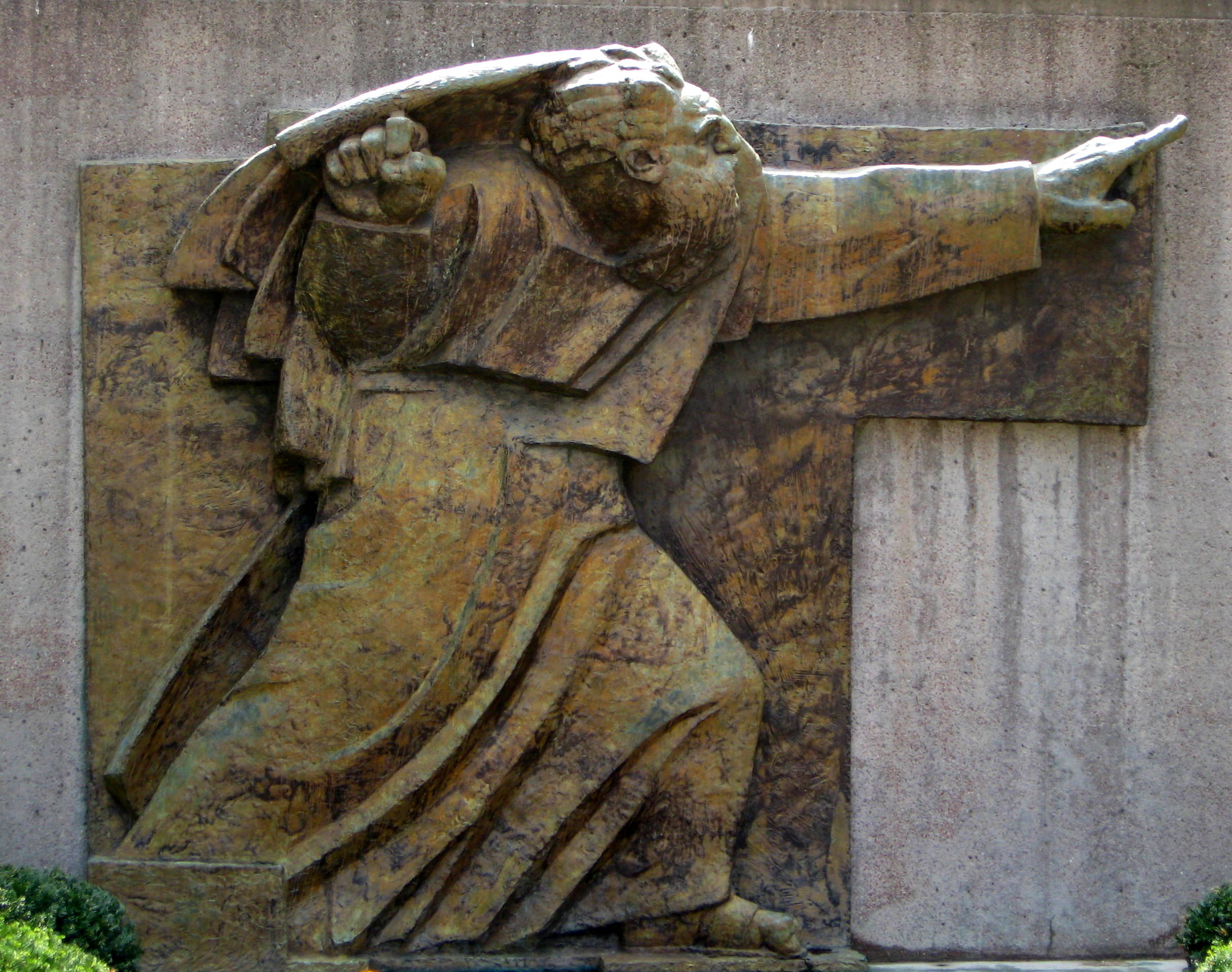
Moses (1952; cast 1990), Syracuse University, Syracuse, New York

Meštrović sculpted numerous sculptures commissioned by the Karađorđević dynasty, especially Alexander I of Yugoslavia. Among the orders of King Alexander are sculptures of a sphinx, Miloš Obilić, Marko Kraljević, the hero of the Kosovo myth Srđa Zlopogleđa, sculptures of female counterparts to Kosovo's heroes, as well as a self-portrait of Meštrović. Most of the commissioned sculptures had the idea of an integral Yugoslav nation as ideological background. Today, the works are mostly located within the royal compound in Dedinje. Meštrović had a role in the constitution of Yugoslav national identity.

He continued to travel to post his exhibits around the world: he displayed at the Brooklyn Museum in New York in 1924, in Chicago in 1925, he even travelled to Egypt and Palestine in 1927. In 1927 he entered a design for the coins of the Irish Free State, and though his design arrived too late for consideration it was adopted in 1965 as the seal of the Central Bank of Ireland.

=== Second World War ===
During the April War in 1941 Meštrović was living in Split. After being warned by novelist and Independent State of Croatia (NDH) minister Mile Budak that the Croatian authorities could not guarantee his safety in Split, he moved to Zagreb in September 1941. Meštrović and painter Jozo Kljaković were arrested by the Ustaše in Zagreb on 7 November 1941, ostensibly due to the regime's fears that the two would emigrate. He eventually served three and a half months in the Savska Cesta prison. With help from archbishop Aloysius Stepinac and subsequently the Vatican he was released, on condition that he travel to Venice to attend the Independent State of Croatia pavilion at the Venice Biennale. From there he relocated to Rome, where he stayed and worked at the Pontifical Croatian College of St. Jerome. He was sponsored here by Fra Dominik Mandić, and during his time in the city was received by Pope Pius XII. In July 1943, Meštrović secured a visa to Switzerland through NDH diplomat Stijepo Perić and moved there. Not all of his family managed to escape — his first wife Ruža died in 1942 and many from her Jewish family were murdered in the Holocaust. Later, his brother Petar was imprisoned for publicly advising Ivan not to return to the country. Looking to create a more favorable image of the newly established socialist regime in Yugoslavia, Marshal Josip Broz Tito's government invited Meštrović to return to the country after World War II ended, but he refused to do so. His decision was final after he received a letter from a high-ranking communist official warning him that he would be given a prominent position such as at a national academy and expected to display complete obedience to the Communist Party. In 1946, Syracuse University offered him a professorship, and he moved to the United States. He became the first artist of Croatian origin to exhibit his work at the Metropolitan Museum of Art in New York City in 1947.

From 1951 he began making contributions to the Croatian emigrant journal Hrvatska revija, which would later publish his memoirs. He was awarded the American Academy of Arts and Letters' Gold Medal for sculpture in 1953. President Dwight D. Eisenhower personally presided over the 1954 ceremony granting Meštrović American citizenship. He went on to become a professor at the University of Notre Dame in 1955.

At the end of January 1951 Meštrović joined the American campaign for the release of Archbishop Stepinac from prison.

=== Later years ===
Before he died, Meštrović returned to Yugoslavia one last time to visit with the imprisoned Cardinal Stepinac and with Tito. At the request of various people from his homeland he sent 59 statues from the United States to Yugoslavia (including the monument of Petar Petrović-Njegoš), and in 1952 signed off his Croatian estates to the people of Croatia, including more than 400 sculptures and numerous drawings. Upon his return he vowed to his colleague painter Jozo Kljaković that he would not return to the country as long as the communists were in power.

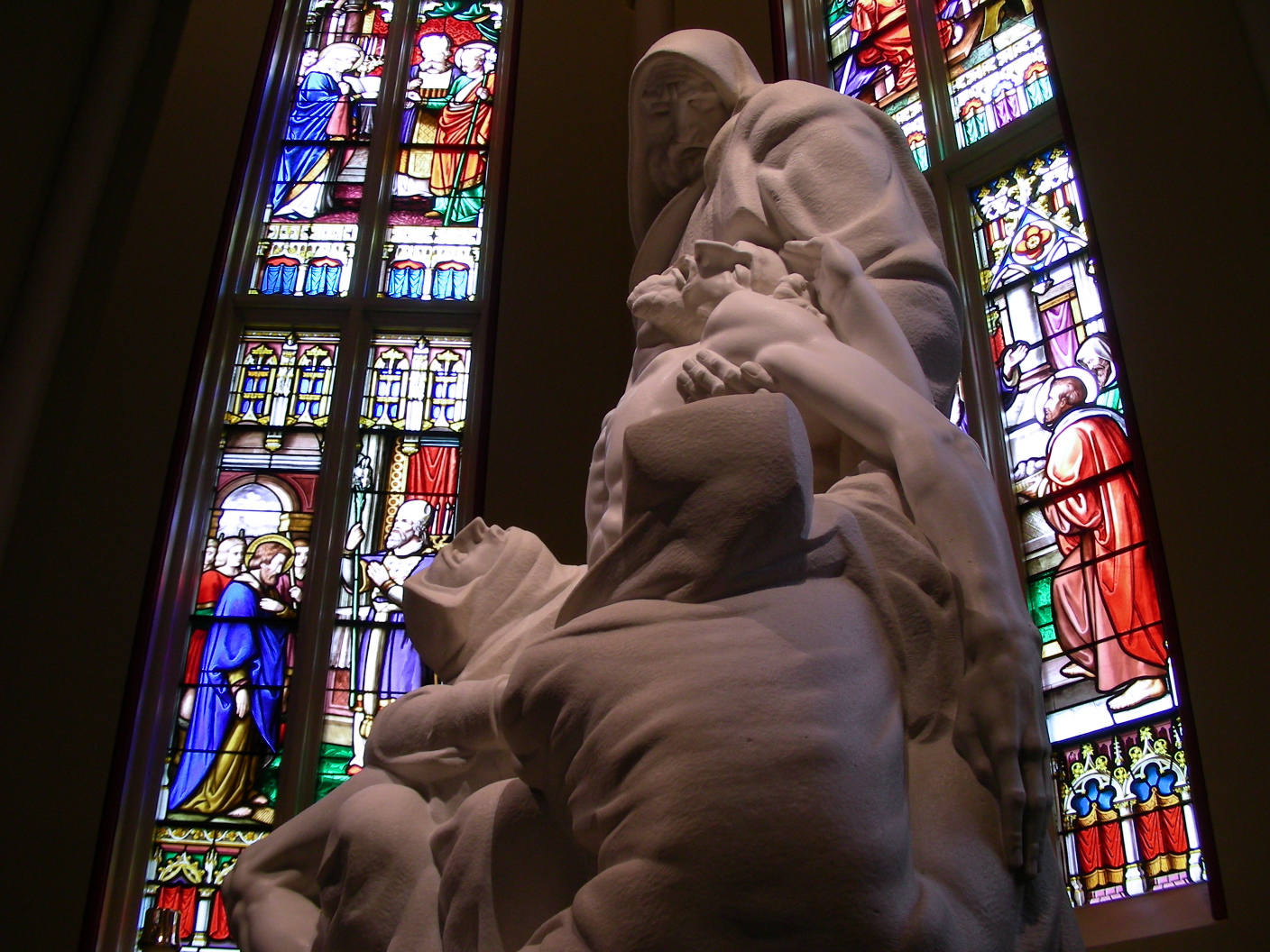
Pietà (1942-46), Basilica of the Sacred Heart, Notre Dame, University of Notre Dame

Two of his children predeceased him. His daughter Marta, who moved with him to the U.S., died in 1949 at the age of 24. His son Tvrtko, who remained in Zagreb, was 39 when he died in 1961.

In 1960 he suffered a minor stroke which affected his eyesight. In 1961, his memoir, Uspomene na političke ljude i događaje (Reminiscences of Political People and Events), was published by the Croatian emigrant publishing house Hrvatska revija (Croatian Review) in Buenos Aires, Argentina. In 1969, they were published by Matica hrvatska in Zagreb.

After creating four clay sculptures to memorialize his children, Meštrović died in early 1962, aged 79, in South Bend, Indiana. His funeral mass was celebrated by the bishops of Šibenik, Josip Arnerić, and bishop of Split-Makarska Frane Franić. His remains were interred at a mausoleum in his childhood home of Otavice. Communist Yugoslav authorities had originally promised the Meštrović family that his remains could lie in repose at the cathedrals in Zagreb and Split. Once his remains had arrived in Yugoslavia, however, the authorities reneged and did not allow this to take place. After communist officials interfered during his funeral, his son Mate Meštrović sharply criticized the level of religious freedom in the country.

His son, Mate, is a Croatian-American diplomat, university professor and editor at Time magazine, who served as a lieutenant in the US Army PsyWar. Later, he served as president of the Croatian National Congress and lobbied on behalf of Croatian self-determination in Washington, D.C., Western Europe and Australia, and was a deputy in the Croatian Parliament, a member of Croatia's delegation to the Council of Europe, and the Inter-Parliamentary Union. He also served as an ambassador in the Foreign Ministry.

Meštrović's grandson Stjepan is an American sociology professor at Texas A&M and author of several books.

== Reputation and legacy ==
80 years after submitting designs for the first coinage of the Irish Free State it was finally used on a 2007 Irish commemorative coin in cooperation with the Croatian bank.

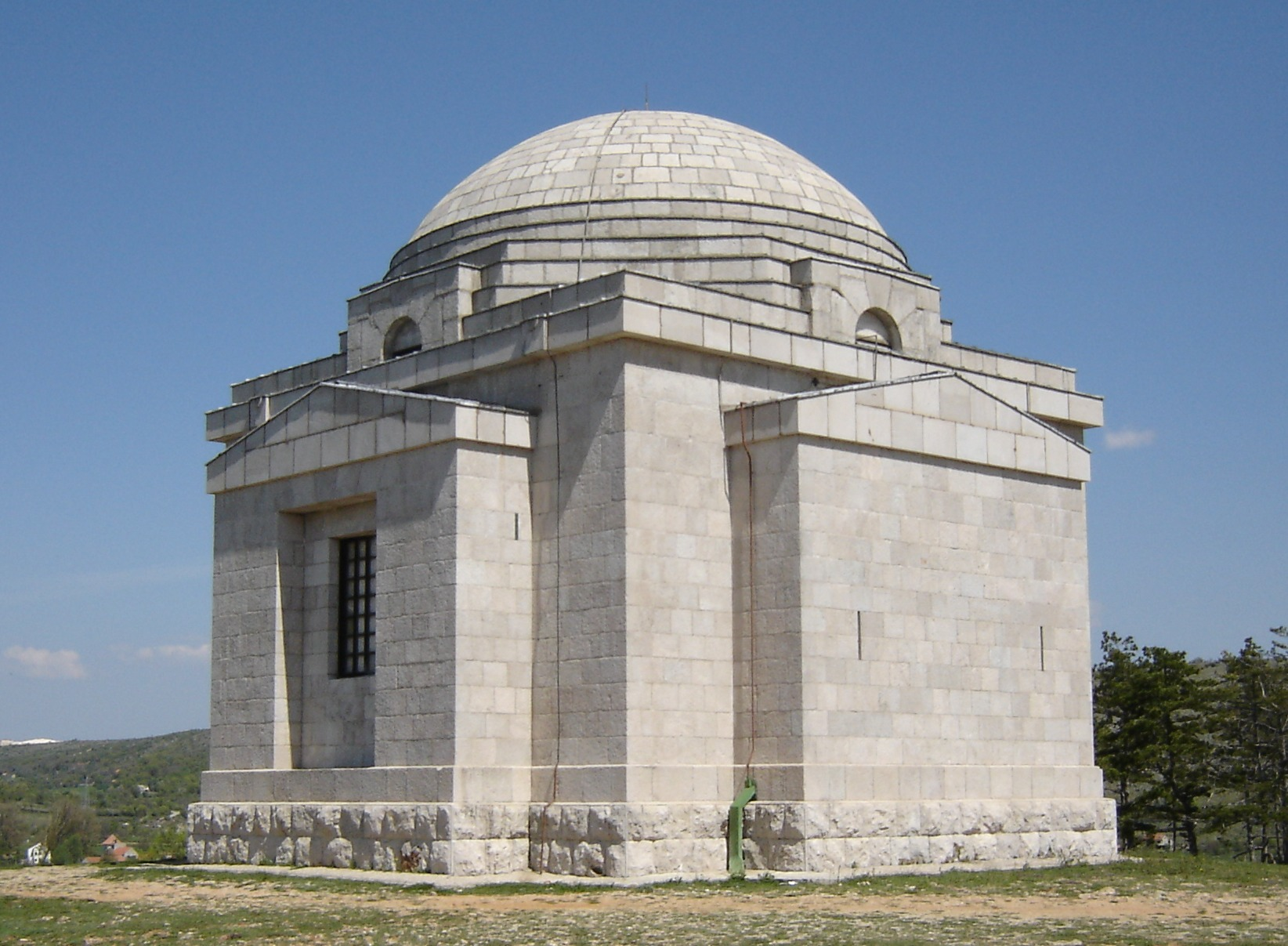
Meštrović's mausoleum in his childhood home of Otavice.

His sculptural strengths are manifested in the lyrical and dramatic expression of the human body. Critics in Europe and the United States ranked him highly in the first half of the 20th century. He is one of the most prominent Croatian artists whose work has at times gained worldwide recognition.

Professor Miljenko Jurkovic of the University of Zagreb states he:

is the most renowned modern Croatian sculptor. His works combine various influences, and they are both monumental and poetic. He sculpted in stone, bronze and wood, covering a diverse range of themes – spreading to religious, portraits and symbolic themes.

Historians Wojciech Roszkowski and Jan Kofman report: "Meštrović's sculpture of the 1389 Battle of Kosovo Field won first prize at an international exhibition in 1911, and critics acclaimed him the greatest sculptor of modern times."

Auguste Rodin's evaluation was often quoted: "Meštrović was the greatest phenomena among the sculptors" of his time.

Alonzo Lansford, editor of Arts Magazine in New York City, reviewed the Mestrovic show of 1947 at the Metropolitan Museum of Art. He wrote: "It is therefore singularly significant that he is almost unanimously revered by American sculptors of all schools as one of the greatest living sculptors."

Several streets in Serbia are named after him.

In 2013, Meštrović was named honorary citizen of the Croatian town Drniš.

== Work ==
Meštrović created over fifty monuments during his two years in Paris (1908–1910). The theme of the Battle of Kosovo particularly moved him, prompting one of his first great works, the Paris Kosovo Monument, as well as other works in bronze and stone. Much of his early work commemorated such epic moments from Slavic history, as he attempted to foster the pan-Slavic cause in his native country.

With the creation of the first Yugoslavia, Meštrović's focus shifted to more mundane topics such as musical instruments or chapels. He particularly oriented himself towards religious items, mostly made of wood, under artistic influence from the Byzantine and Gothic architecture. The most renowned works from his early period are the Crucifix and Madonna; later he became inspired by Michelangelo Buonarroti and created a large number of stone reliefs and portraits. The Croatian dinar featured Meštrović's work History of the Croats.

Meštrović's most famous monuments include:

- Gregory of Nin (1929), Split, Croatia
- Monument of Gratitude to France (1930) in Belgrade, Serbia
- Monument to the Unknown Hero (1938), Avala, Belgrade, Serbia
- Victor monument (1928) on Kalemegdan Fortress in Belgrade, Serbia
- History of Croats (1932) in Zagreb and in the Royal Compound, Belgrade.
- Mausoleum of Njegoš (1974) on Mount Lovćen in Montenegro
- Well of Life (1905), Croatian National Theatre in Zagreb, Croatia
- The Bowman and The Spearman (1928) in Chicago, USA
- Martin Kukučín (1977) in the Medical Garden, Bratislava, Slovakia
- King Carol I (1939) in Bucharest, Romania - this monument was destroyed by communists after 1948
- Pietà (1946) in the Basilica of the Sacred Heart, Notre Dame, Indiana, USA
- Christ and the Samaritan Woman and St. Luke (1957), Notre Dame, Indiana, USA
- St. Jerome the Priest (1954), Embassy of Croatia, Washington, D.C., USA
- Relief of Cardinal Aloysius Stepinac with Christ (1960), Zagreb Cathedral, Zagreb
- Source of life (1930) in Drniš, Croatia
- Crucifix and Young Christ Teaching in the Temple (1957), Keenan and Stanford Halls, Notre Dame
- Crucifix at St. Joseph Cathedral (Baton Rouge, Louisiana)
- Ion I. C. Brătianu (1937) in Bucharest, Romania
- Domagoj's Archers (1917) in Zagreb (Meštrović Foundation)
- Canadian Phalanx (1920) a marble relief, 284 Wellington Street in Ottawa, Ontario
- Josip Juraj Strossmayer in Zagreb
- Svetozar Miletić (1939) in Novi Sad, Serbia
- Nikola Tesla in Zagreb
- Villagers (Seljaci) (1907), Ban Jelačić Square, Zagreb
- Nadežda Petrović in Čačak

Galleries displaying his work include:

- Ivan Meštrović Gallery in Split, created after his major donation in 1950, which includes 86 statues in marble, stone, bronze, wood and gypsum, 17 drawings, and also eight bronze statues in the open garden, 28 reliefs in wood in the kaštelet and one stone crucifix
- Ivan Meštrović Memorial Gallery created in 1973 in Vrpolje, his birthplace, with 35 works in bronze and plaster stone
- Raclin Murphy Museum of Art at the University of Notre Dame has many of his works. He was artist-in-residence at Notre Dame and resided in South Bend, Indiana, until his death.
- National Museum of Serbia holds sculptures and monuments (a total of 45 works) including Miloš Obilić, Kosovo girl, Srđa Zlopogleđa, Kraljević Marko, and Widow
- Louisiana Arts and Science Museum (LASM) (retrieved January 29, 2016) in Baton Rouge has a large collection of his sculpture and drawings.
- Church of Sts. Cyril & Methodius and St. Raphael (New York City)

He painted in oil (Moja majka [My mother], 1911).

=== Written works ===
He wrote essays (Moji razgovori s Michelangelom [My Interviews with Michelangelo], 1926), memoirs about the public and political life of his time (Uspomene na političke ljude i događaje [Memories of Political People and Events], 1969) and short stories (Ludi Mile [Crazy Mile], 1970).

- Stepinac - duhovni heroj (Stepinac - Spiritual Hero), Hrvatska revija, Buenos Aires 1956.
- Uspomene na političke ljude i događaje (Memories of Political Persons and Events), Hrvatska revija, Buenos Aires 1961, reprinted by Matica hrvatska in 1969.

== Gallery ==
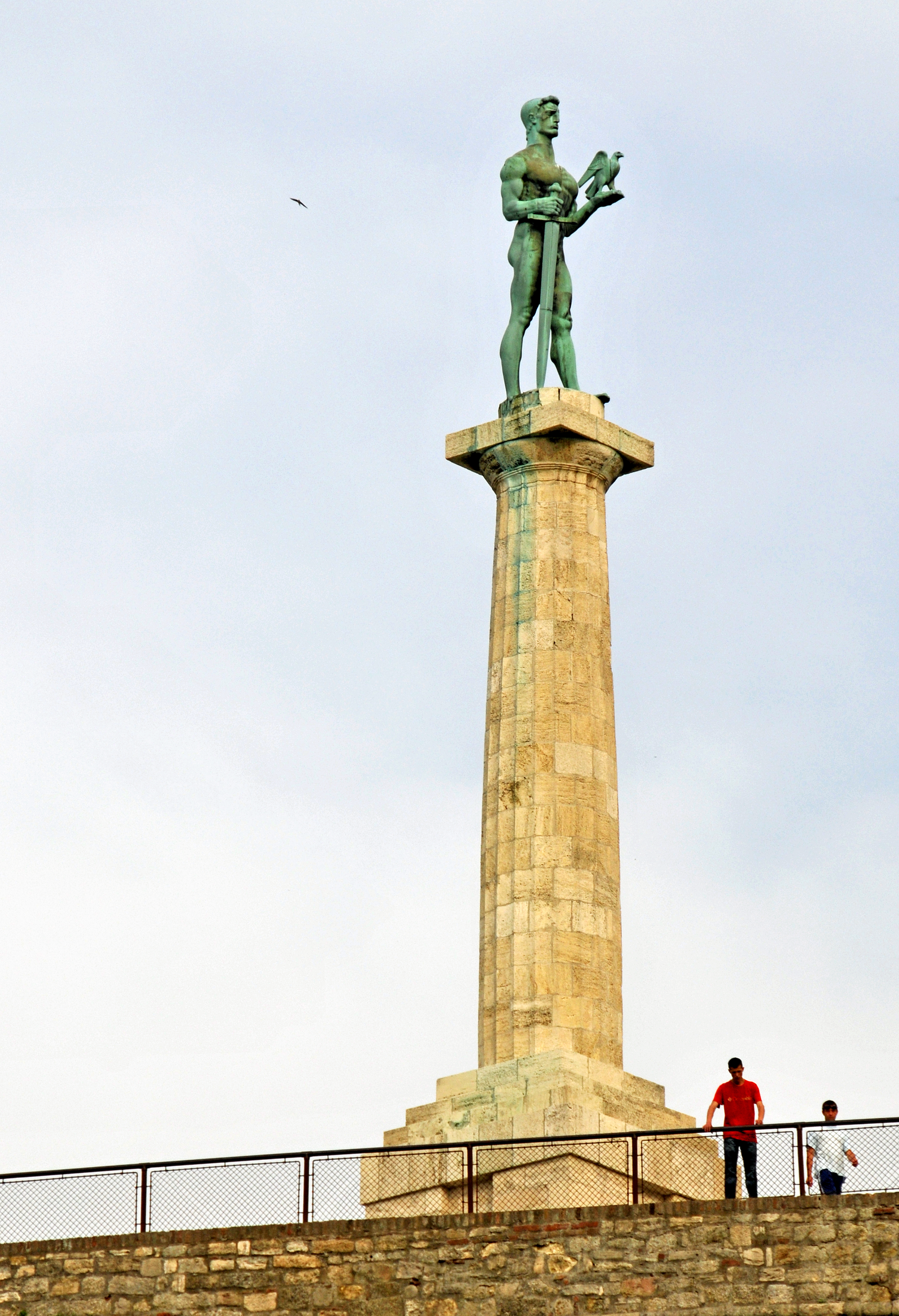
Victor, Belgrade, Serbia

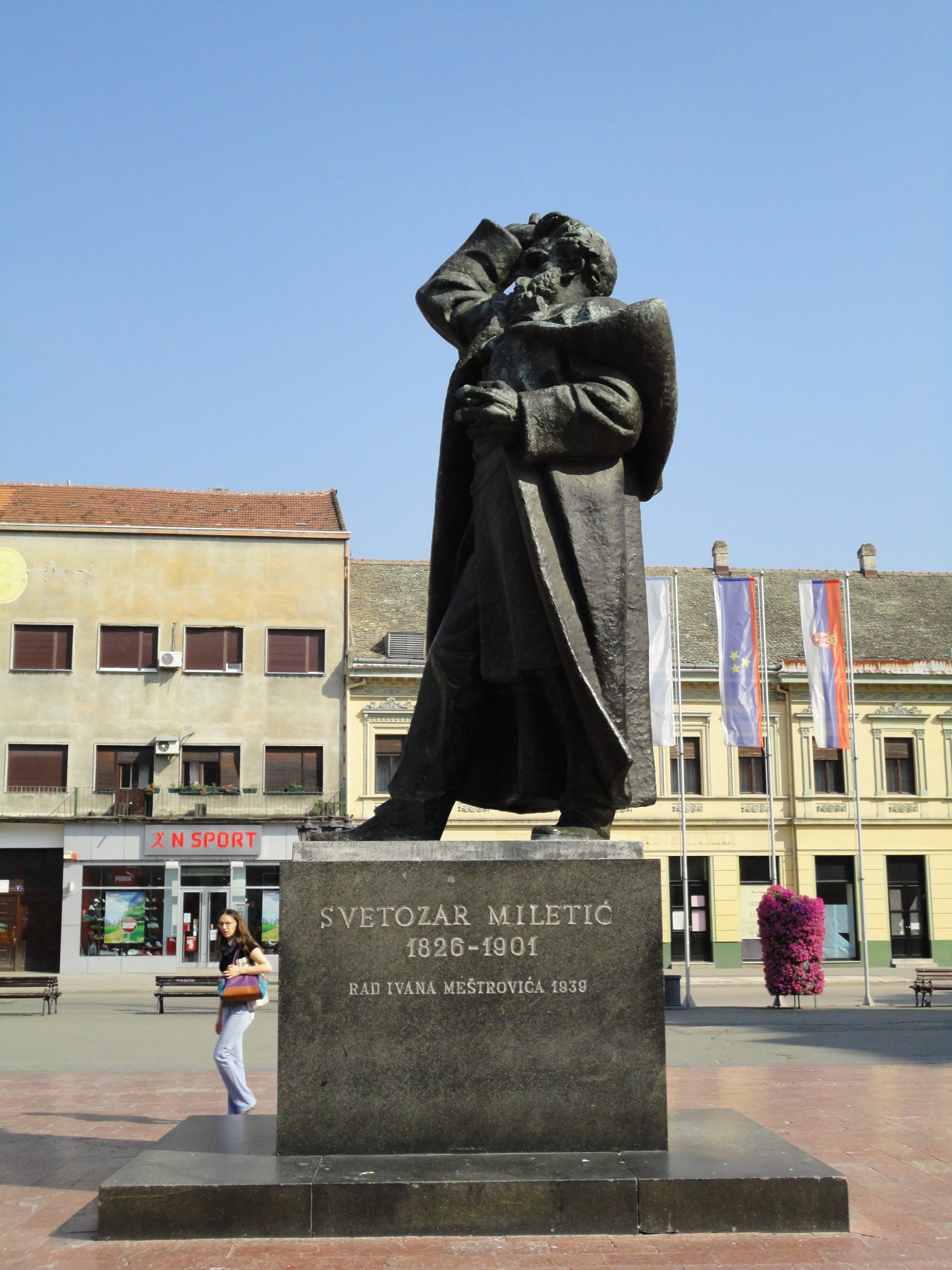
Svetozar Miletić Monument, Novi Sad, Serbia

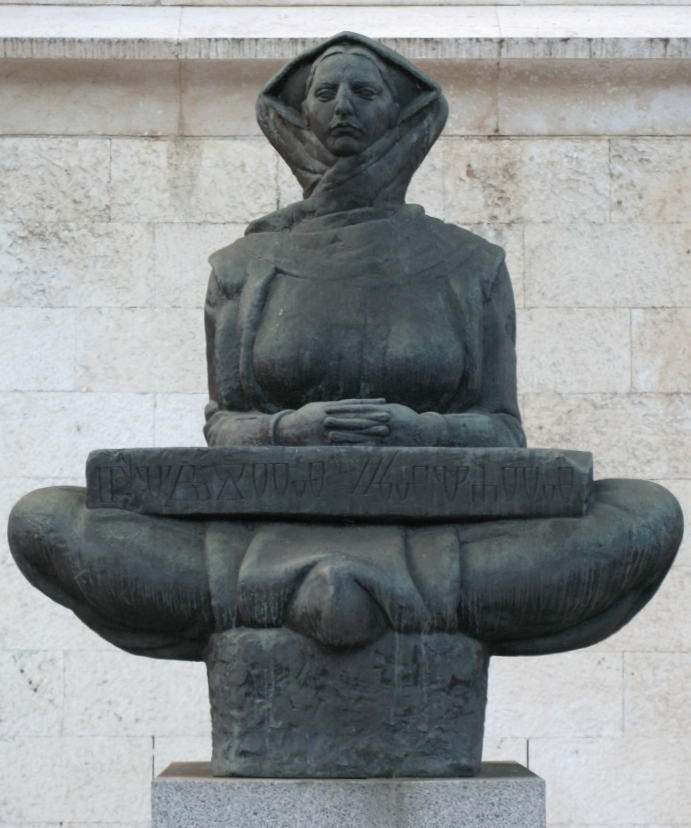
History of Croats (1932), University of Zagreb

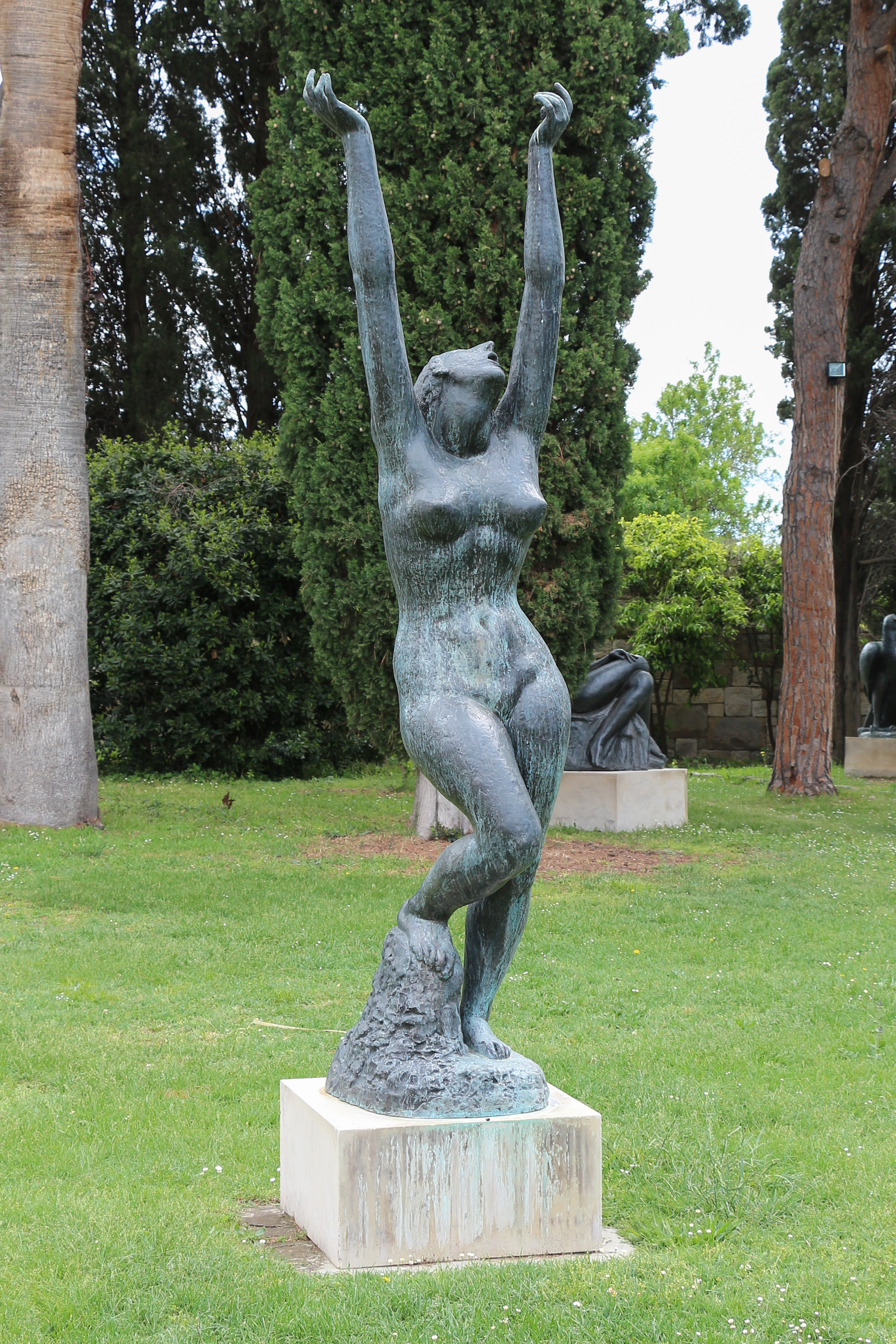
Persephone, Ivan Meštrović Gallery, Split, Croatia

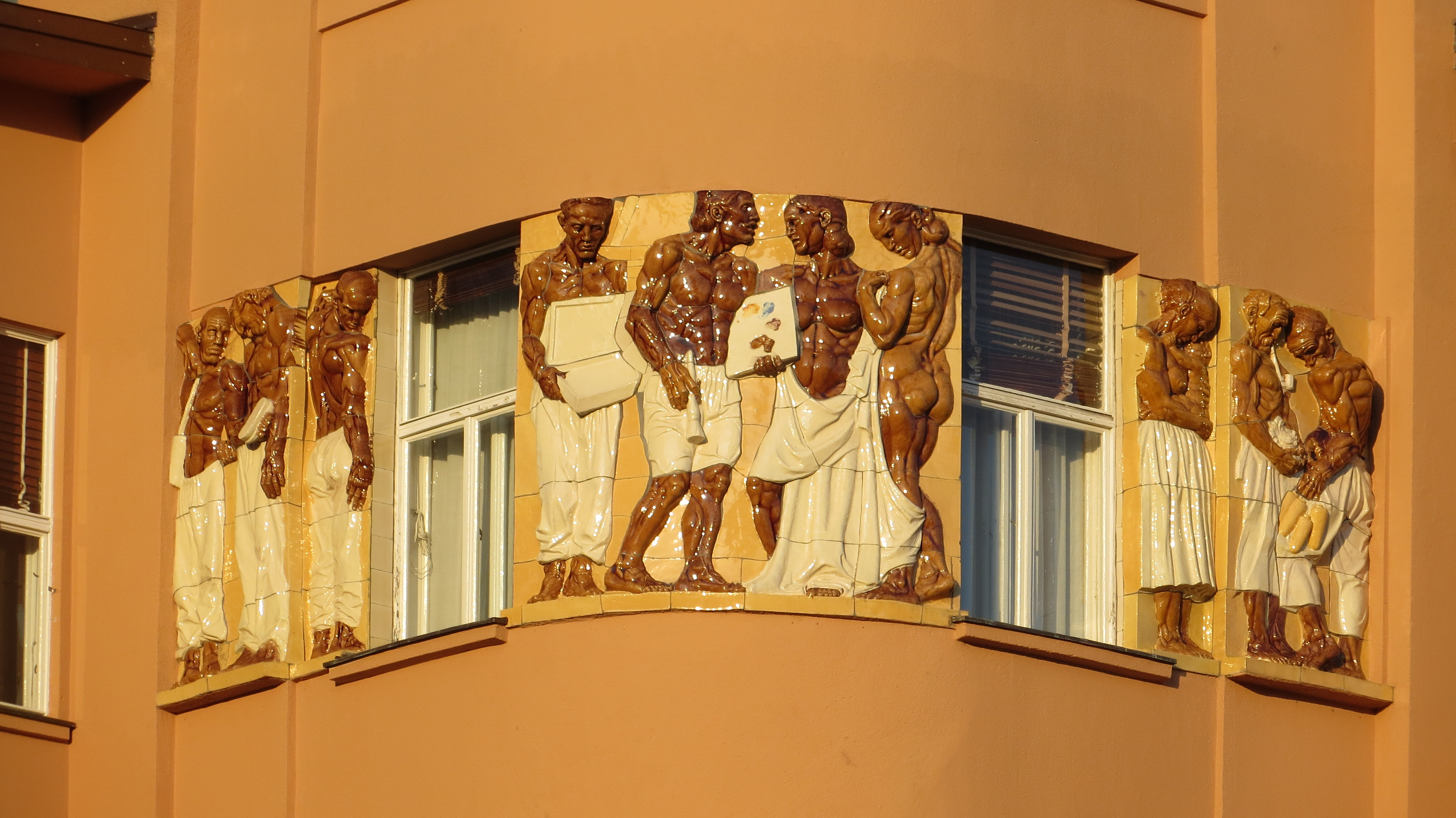
Seljaci (1907), Ban Jelačić Square in Zagreb, Croatia

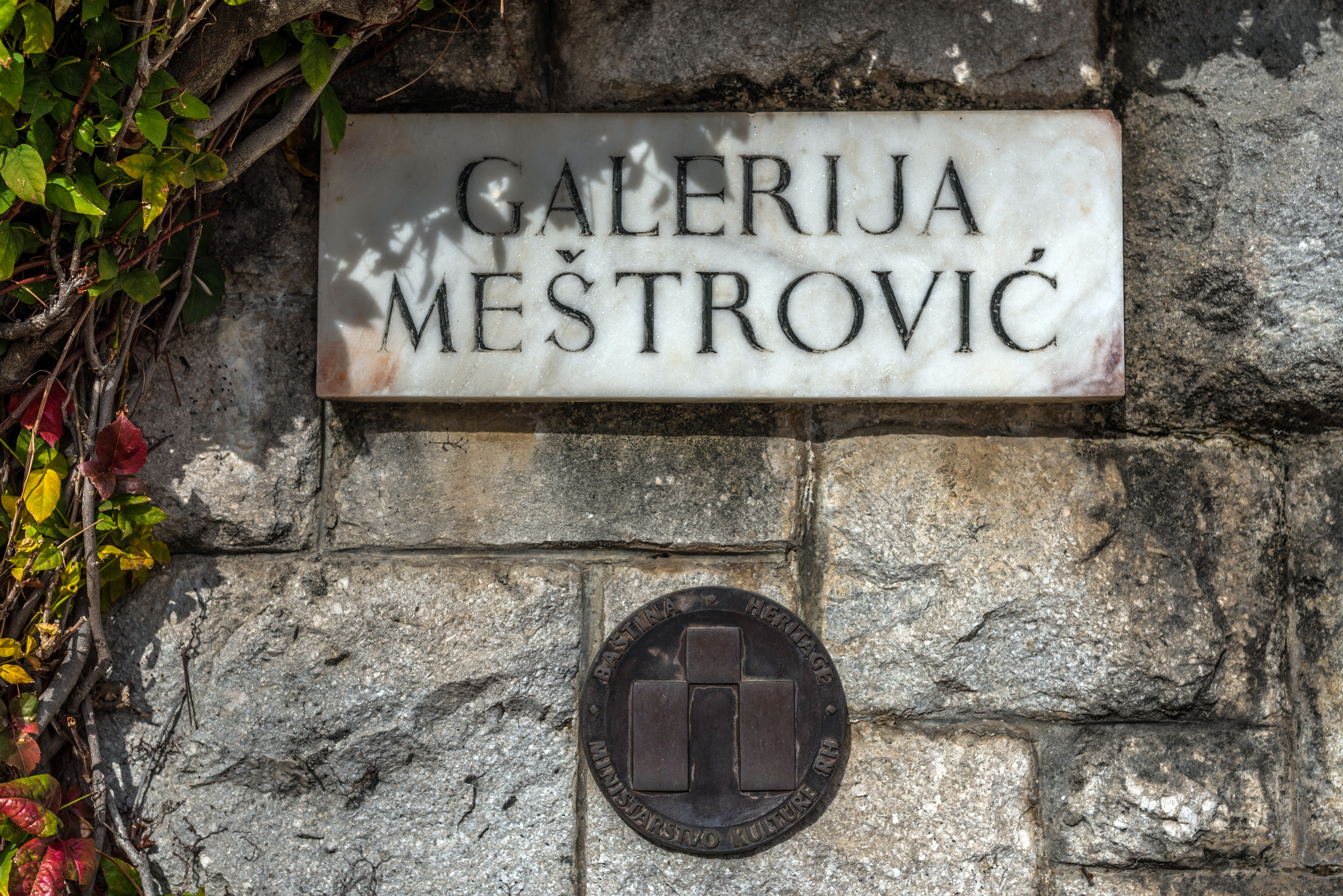
Plaque on Ivan Meštrović Gallery, Split

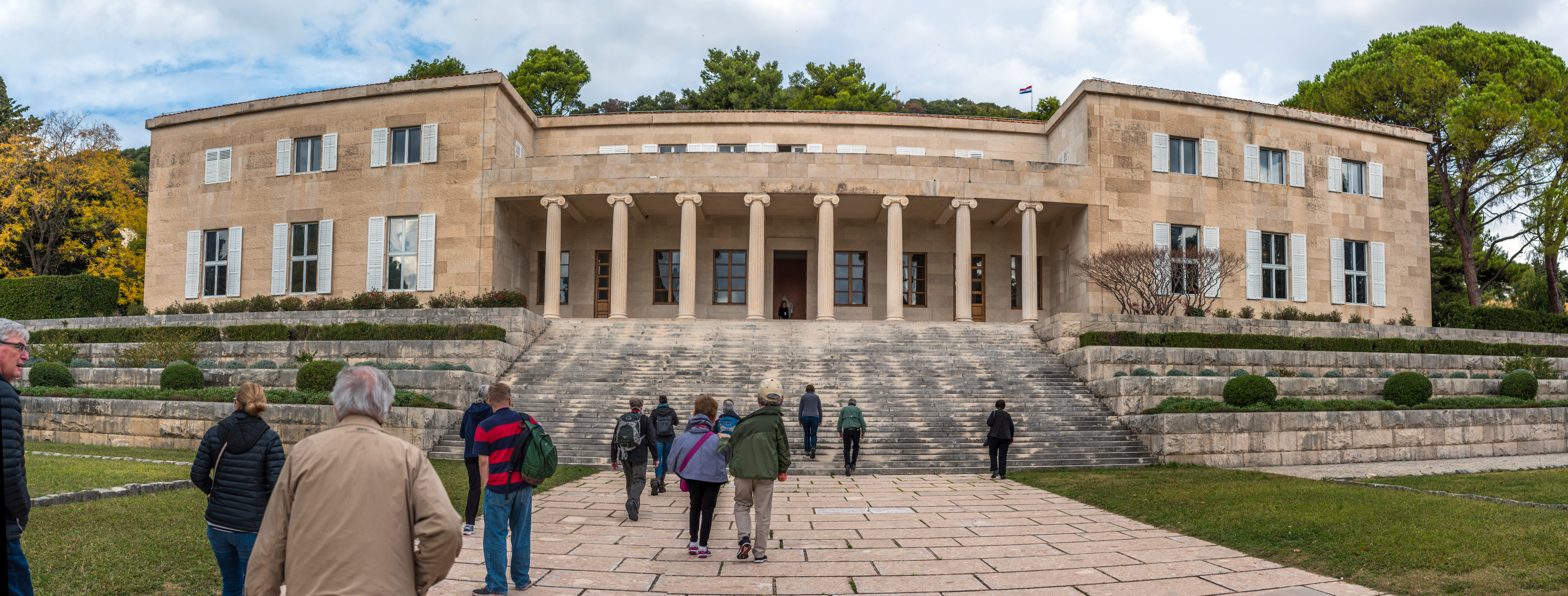
Main entrance and façade of the gallery

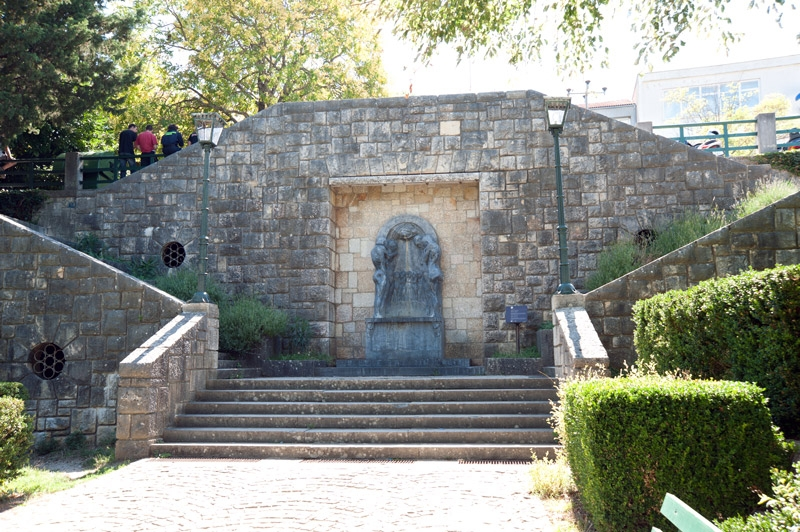
Source of Life, Drniš, Croatia

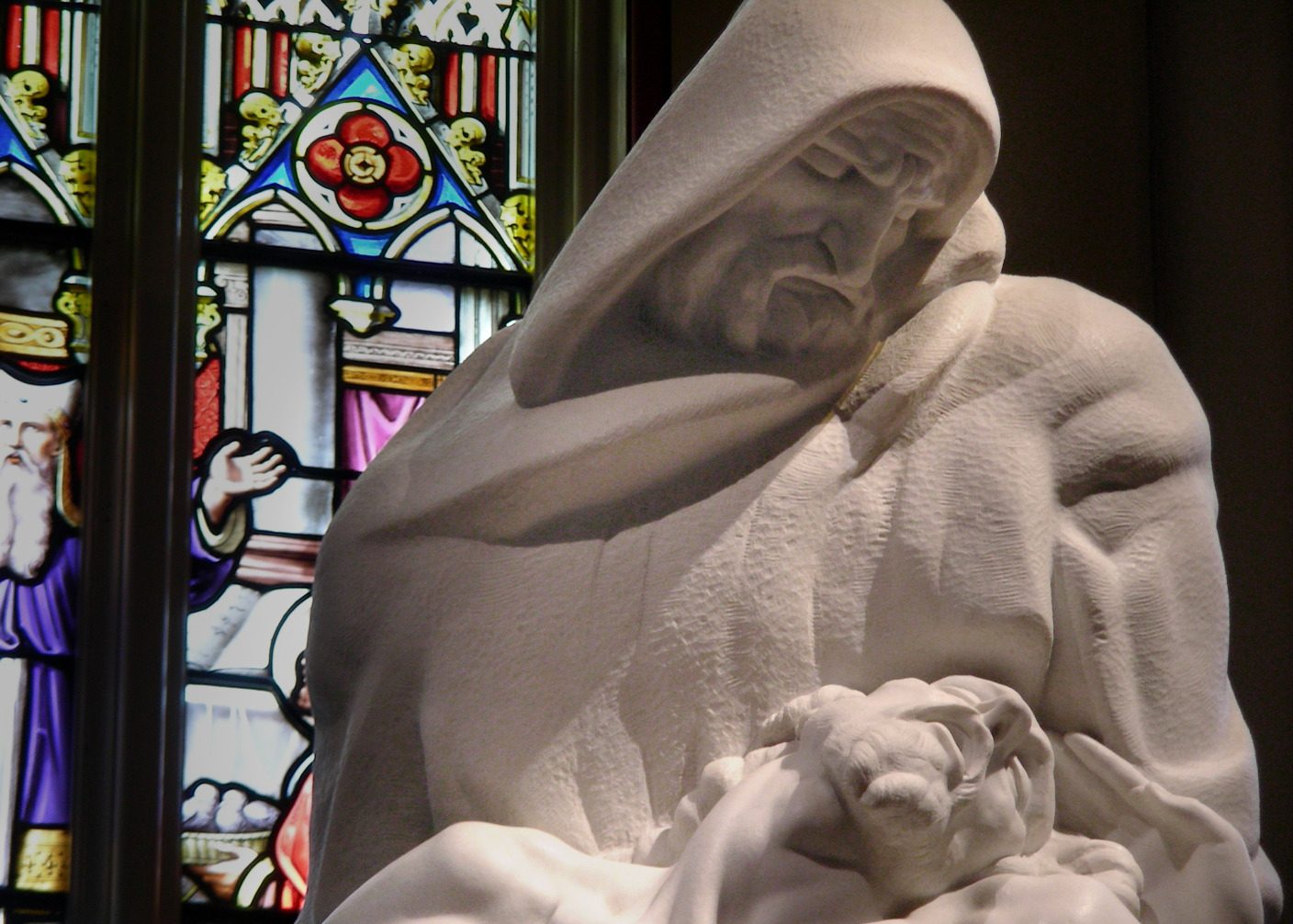
Pieta, University of Notre Dame, Indiana

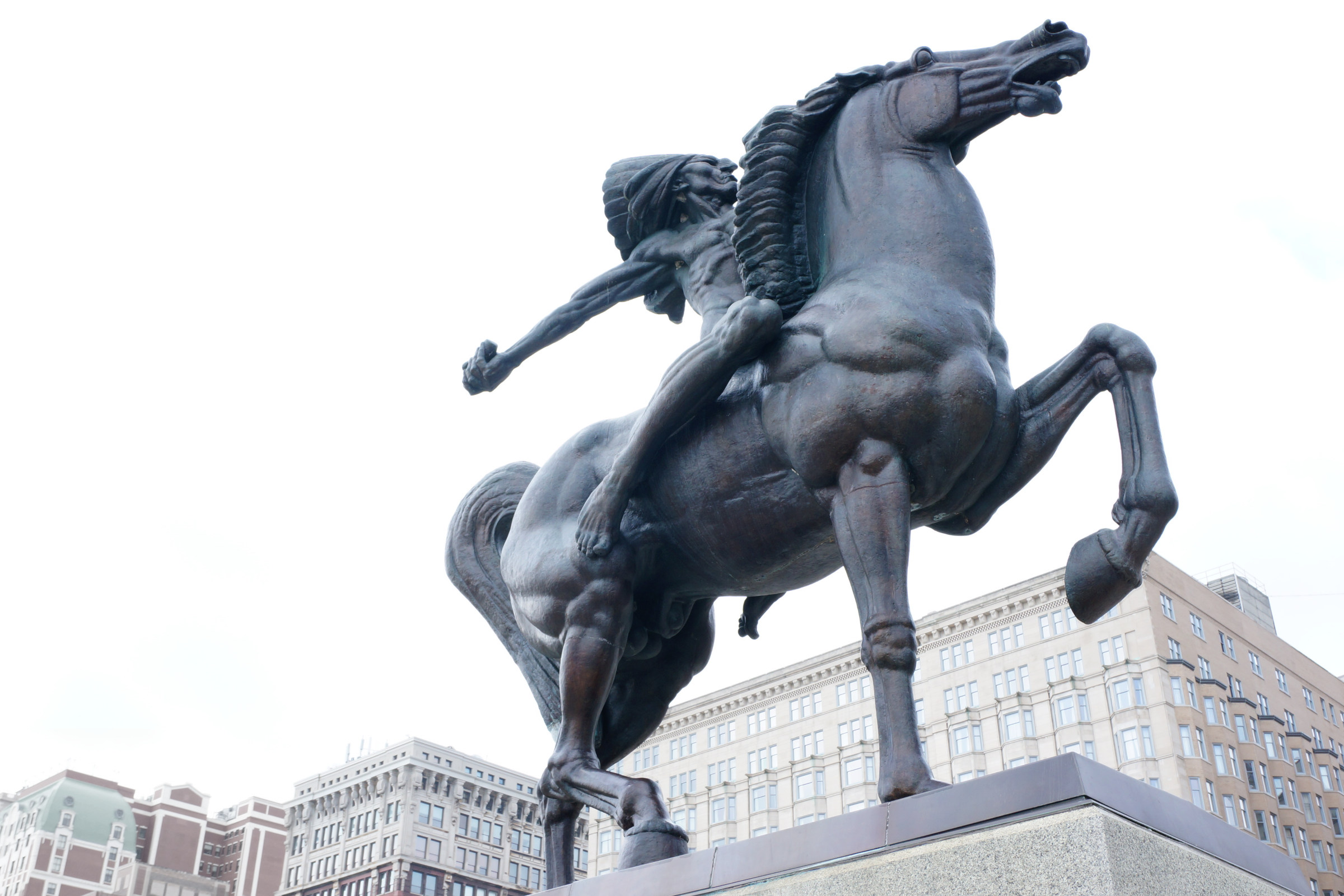
The Bowman and The Spearman, Chicago, USA

== Bibliography ==
- Adamec, Ana. (1984). Ivan Meštrović 1883-1962, SANU, Belgrade.
- Ali, Abdullah Yusuf. (1915). Meštrović and Serbian Sculpture, Matthews, London.
- Casson, Stanley. (1929). Some Modern Sculptors, Oxford University Press, London
- Ćurčin, Milan. (1919) Ivan Meštrović - A Monograph, Williams & Norgate, London.
- Goode, James M. (1974). The Outdoor Sculpture of Washington D. C., Smithsonian Institution Press, Washington D.C.
- G. Bozidar/N. Gattin (1987) Ivan Meštrović, Zagreb
- Josipović, Slađana (2007). "Politizacija pokopa Ivana Meštrovića". Journal of Contemporary History. 39 (2): 319–338.
- Kečkemet, Duško. (1970). Ivan Meštrović. The Only Way To Be An Artist Is To Work, Spektar, Zagreb.
- Kraševac, Irena. (2002). Ivan Meštrović i secesija Beć-Muenchen-Prag 1900-1910, HAZU, Zagreb.
- Schmeckebier, Laurence E. (1959). Ivan Meštrović – Sculptor and Patriot, Syracuse University Press, Syracuse.
