= Jozo Kljaković =

Croatian painter, writer, illustrator, cartoonist

- Born: Jozo Kljaković; 10 March 1889; Solin, Austria-Hungary
- Died: 1 October 1969 (aged 80); Zagreb, Yugoslavia
- Known for: Painting

Jozo Kljaković (3 March 1889 – 10 October 1969) was a Croatian painter.

He studied in Prague and then at an Arts institute in Rome. He also studied fresco painting in Paris. Kljaković was professor at the Academy of Fine Arts in Zagreb from 1921 to 1943. He lived in the Art Nouveau neighbourhood of Rokov perivoj in Zagreb. Notably, he painted a cycle of 14 frescoes for the St. Mark's Church in the city. He was chiefly influenced by Art Nouveau, Ferdinand Hodler and Ivan Meštrović, a friend of his. In Croatia he is described as a "master of fresco painting". His former home in Zagreb is now an art centre.

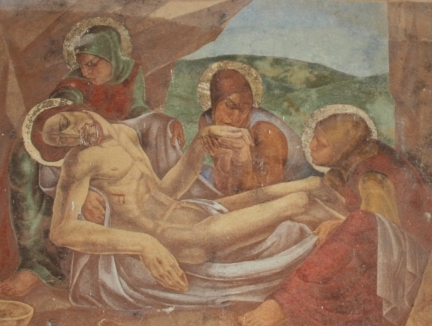
Fresco by Jozo Kljaković: Polaganje Isusa u grob
