= St. Jerome the Priest (Meštrović) =

Artwork by Ivan Meštrović

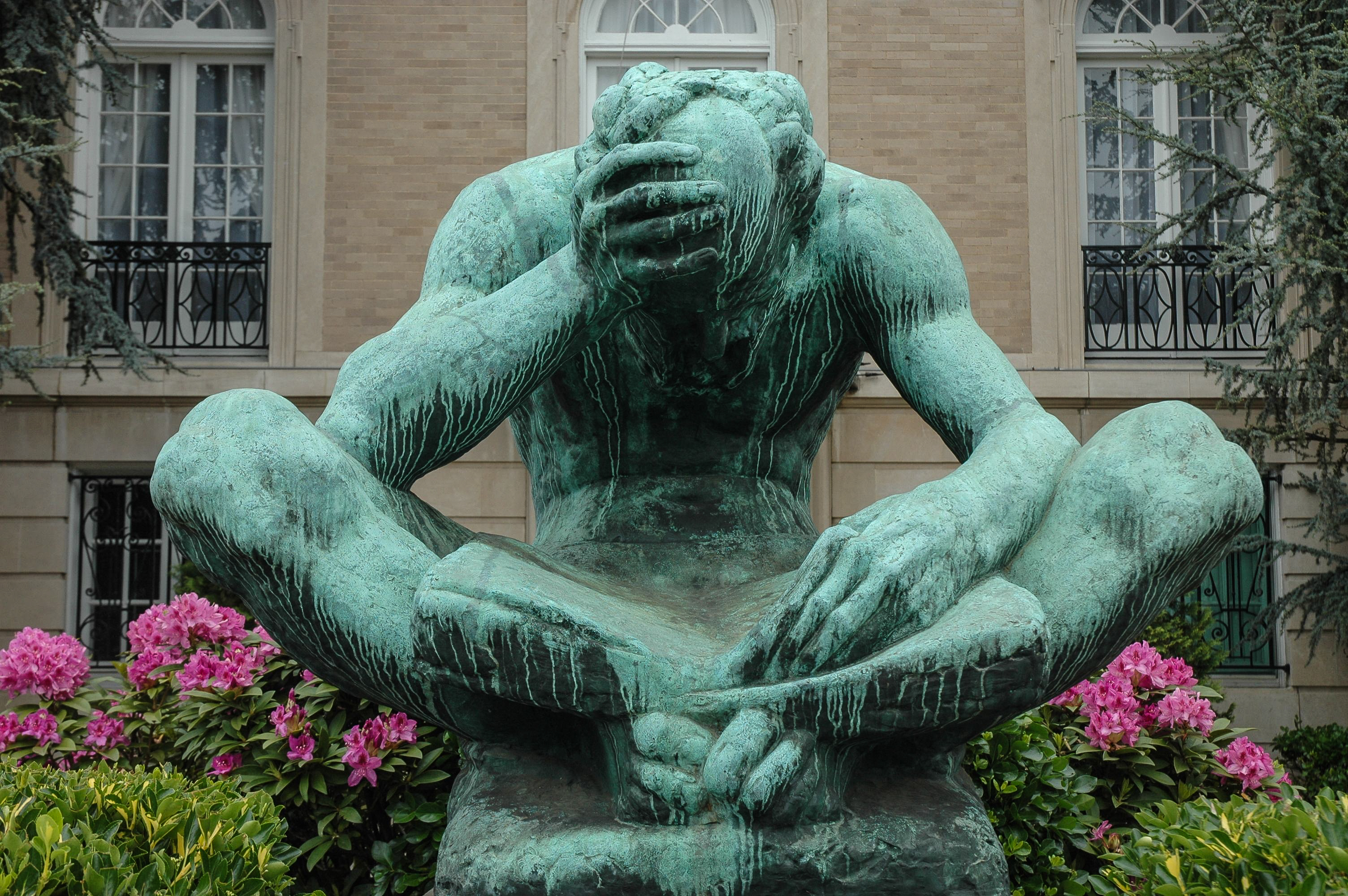
- Artist: Ivan Meštrović
- Year: 1954
- Dimensions: 2.4 m × 0.91 m (8 ft × 3 ft)
- Location: Washington, D.C., United States; 38°54′48.6″N 77°3′8.15″W

St. Jerome the Priest is a bronze statue, by Ivan Meštrović, located at 2343 Massachusetts Avenue, Northwest, Washington, D.C.

Ivan Meštrović donated this work to the Croatian Franciscan Province of the Third Order Regular of St. Francis of Penance, who commissioned it as Saint Jerome. Jerome was born on the territory of modern Croatia. This Meštrović statue was originally located at the Franciscan Fathers' St. Jerome House of Studies at 1359 Monroe Street, N.E., Washington, D.C., and was later moved to the front of the Croatian Embassy on Embassy Row.

The inscription reads:
(On front of base:)

ST. JEROME THE PRIEST

A.D. 341–420
GREATEST DOCTOR OF THE CHURCH

I. MESTROVIC

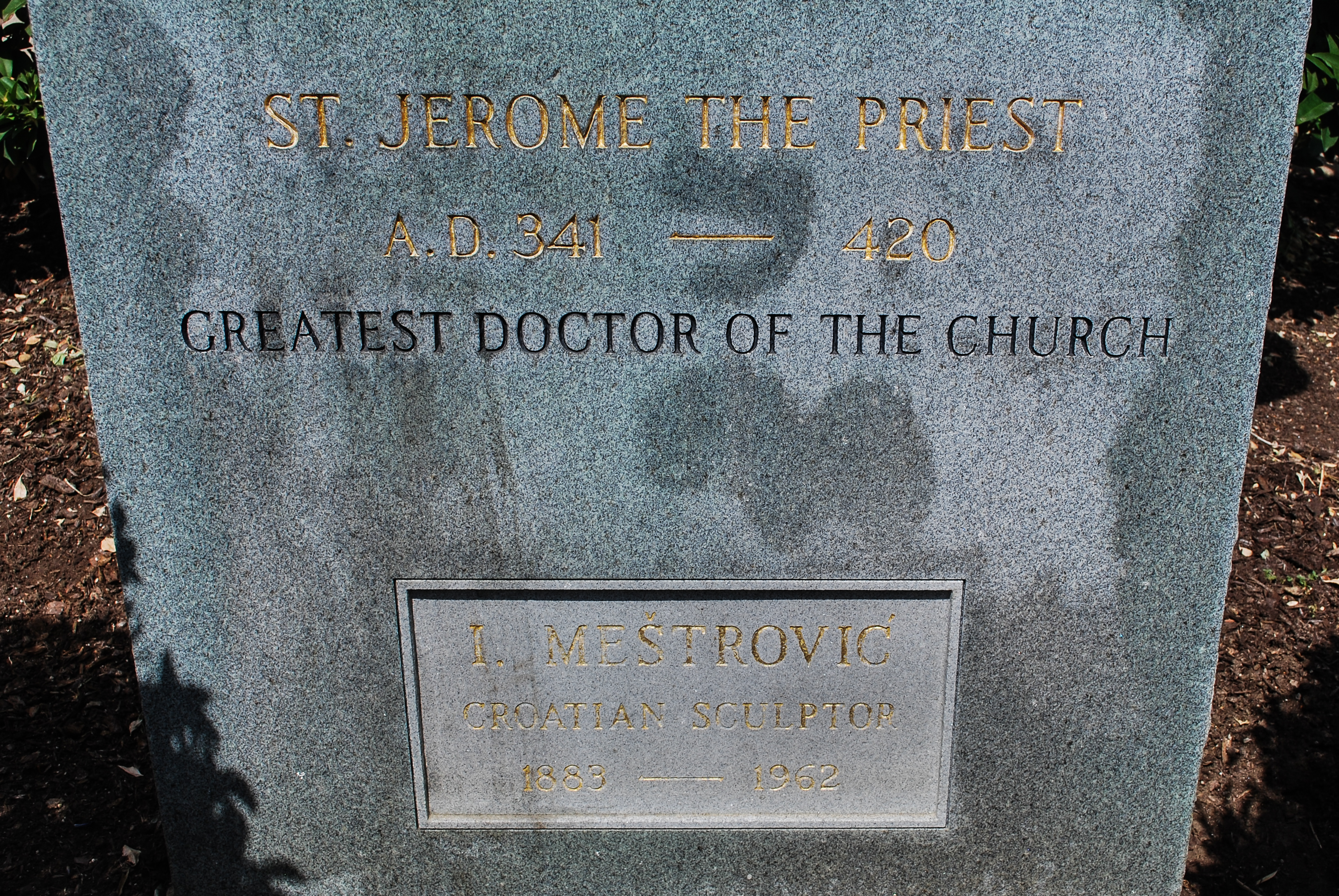
The statue's base

== See also ==
- List of public art in Washington, D.C., Ward 2
