= The Bowman and The Spearman =

Set of two equestrian statues in Chicago

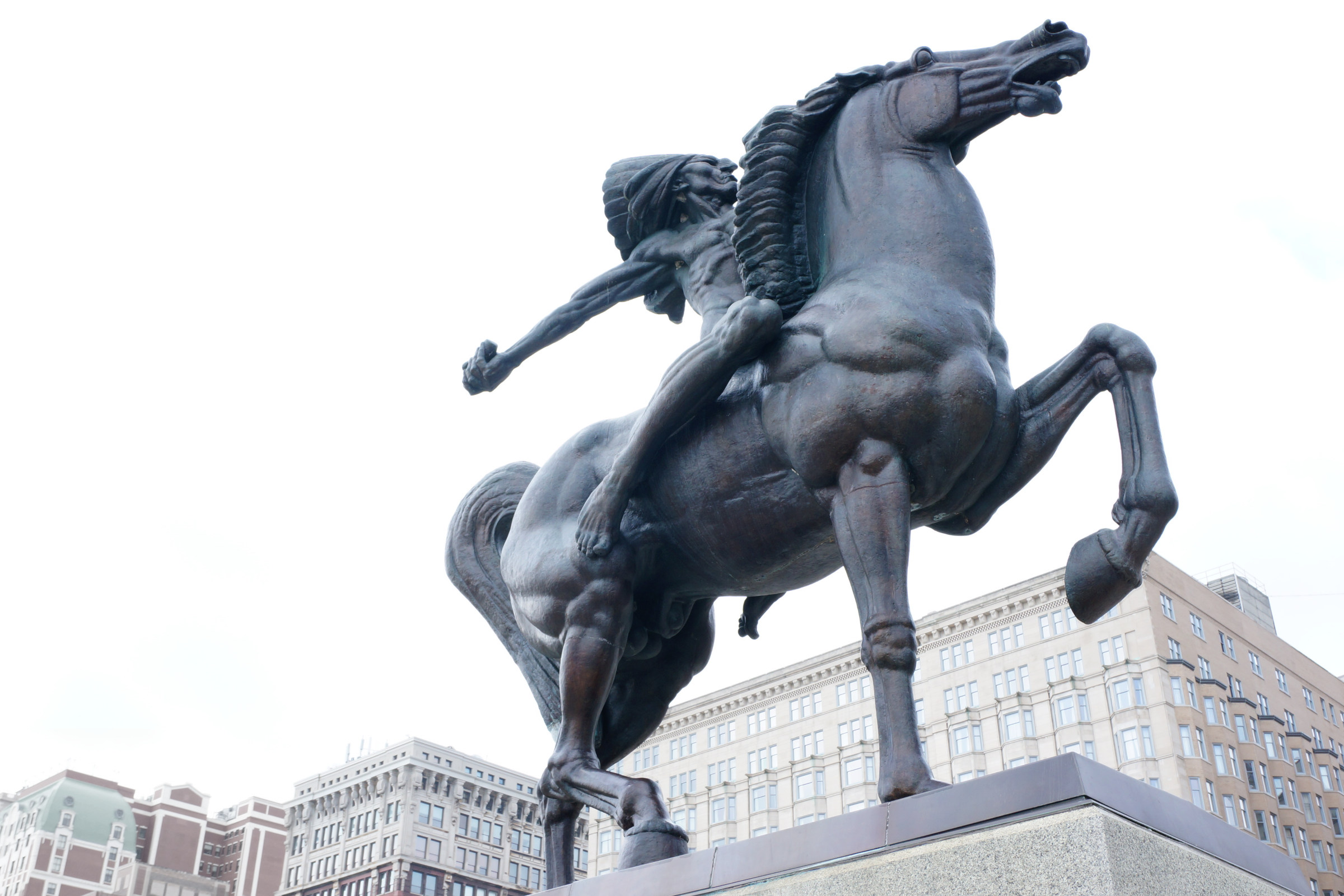
The Spearman

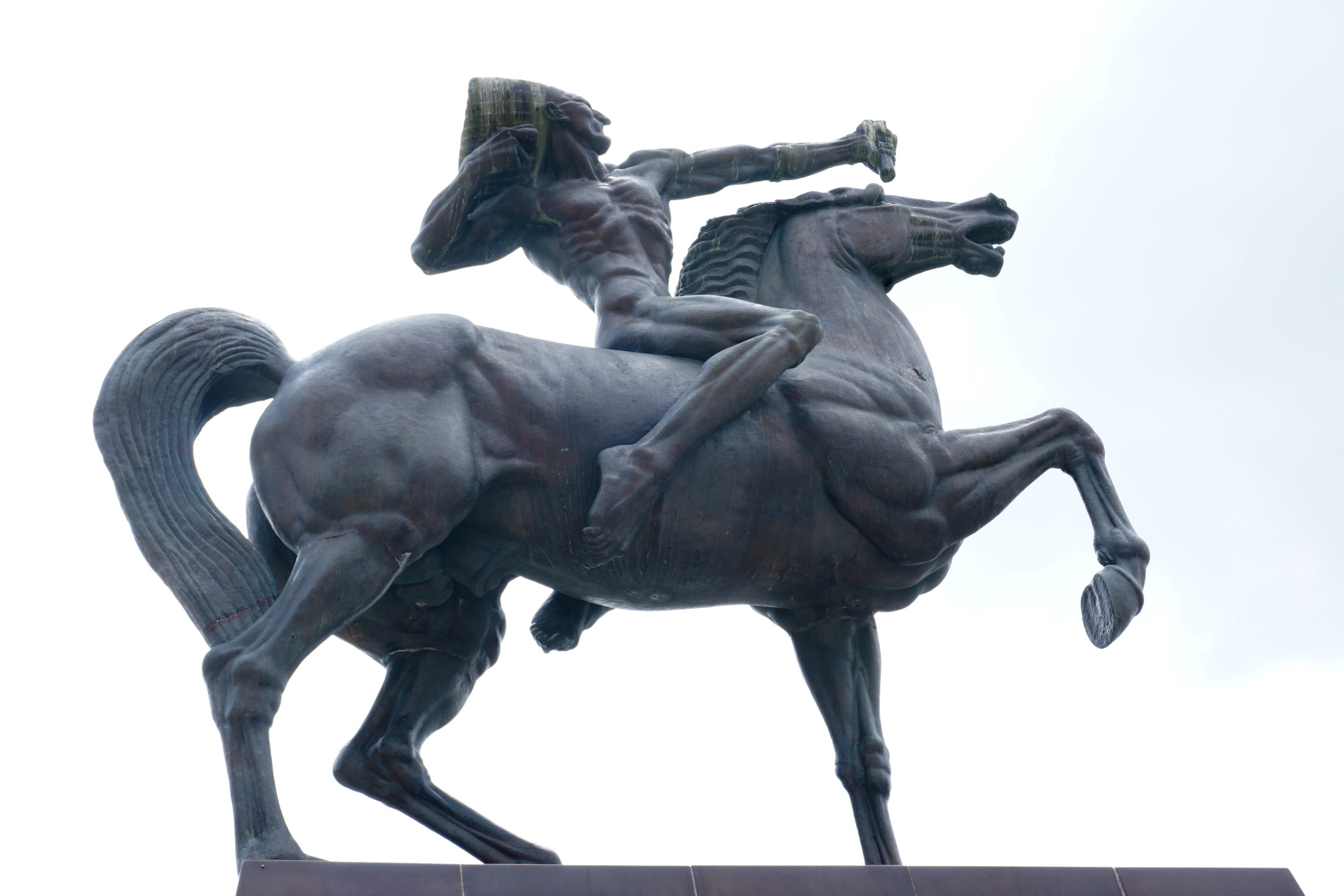
The Bowman

The Bowman and The Spearman, also known collectively as Equestrian Indians, or simply Indians, are two bronze equestrian sculptures standing as gatekeepers in Congress Plaza, at the intersection of Ida B. Wells Drive and Michigan Avenue in Chicago's Grant Park, in the U.S. state of Illinois. The sculptures were made in Zagreb by Croatian sculptor Ivan Meštrović and installed at the entrance of the parkway in 1928. Funding was provided by the Benjamin Ferguson Fund.

== Structure ==
Each statue stands seventeen feet high and rests atop an eighteen-foot granite pedestal. When the area was first designed, the statues were intended to guard a grand staircase into the park. However, this staircase was removed when Congress Parkway was extended in the 1940s. Research in 2006 suggested that the lettering on the pedestals designed by architects Holabird & Roche was executed by sculptor Rene Paul Chambellan.

== History ==
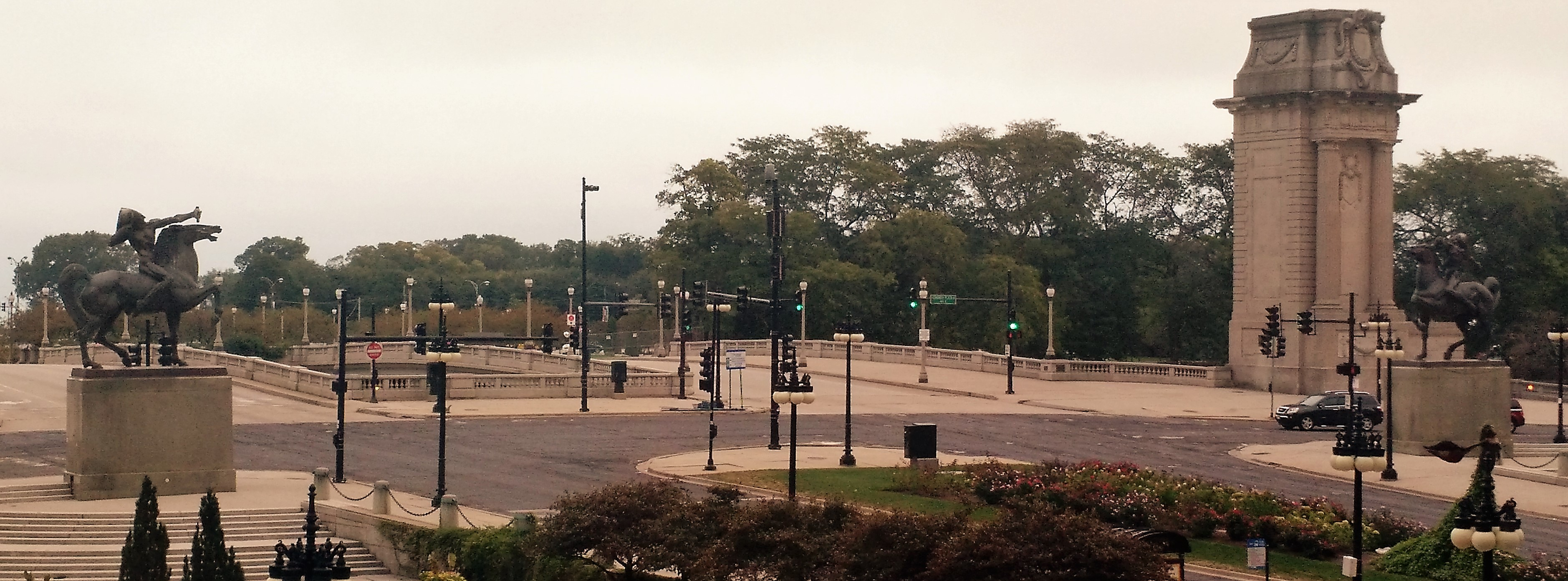
The entrance to Grant Park on Ida B. Wells Drive near Michigan Avenue, flanked on either side by The Bowman and The Spearman

The idea of placing large sculptures at the park entrance originated from famed urban planner Daniel Burnham's 1909 Plan of Chicago. Burnham, a man of vision and charisma, was a strong influence on how the lakefront appears today. He imagined a vast parkland stretching from Michigan Avenue to the lakeshore filled with beautiful gardens, walkways, and public works of art. Burnham himself, however, planned for the two statues to be of “one Indian and one ‘Buffalo Bill like’ depiction of the conquering white pioneers" to symbolize both America's Indian heritage and its struggle for expansion.

An unusual aspect of the sculptures is that both figures are missing their respective weapons, the bow and arrow and the spear. The omitting of the weapons was intentional, as the artist preferred that they be “left to the imagination while attention is focused upon the bold lines of the musculature of both man and beast, as well as the linear patterns of the horses’ manes and tails and the figures’ headdresses.” Despite the fact that the weapons never actually existed, many theories have existed over time as to their supposed whereabouts. Some believe that they were taken as part of an elaborate prank, while others are under the impression that their removal was a show of respect after the events of September 11, 2001.

One author said of these works, "Meštrović's finest monumental sculptures are his Chicago Indians (1926–27), they are not too obviously stylized: the muscles on the horsemen are almost anatomically realistic... These statues show how much more important true sculptural feeling is than ideology, for Meštrović hardly knew anything about the ideals of the American Indians and they certainly did not move him."

After completing a number of statues in Europe and other parts of the world, Meštrović returned to the United States and spent the remainder of his life as a celebrated professor first at Syracuse University and later at the University of Notre Dame.

In 2021, in the context of George Floyd protests and the accompanying removal of controversial public monuments, the sculptures were included in the Chicago Monuments Project, whose goal was to evaluate monuments with racially and historically problematic content. The Project's website provided the following description: "Impressive for their heroic scale and bristling energy, the sculptures have been criticized for their romanticized and reductive images of American Indians." The potential removal of the sculptures from the public space sparked extensive discussion in Croatian media, as well as eliciting an official reaction from the Croatian Ministry of Culture and Media calling for the preservation of the sculptures. The Project's final report noted that the public regarded the Indians as one of the least problematic monuments included in the survey; the Project classified the Indians among historically and artistically significant artwork, recommending their recontextualisation through artistic interventions, rather than taking the sculptures down.

== Latitude and longitude coordinates ==
- The Bowman: 41.87598°N 87.62348°W
- The Spearman: 41.87550°N 87.62348°W
