= Ivan Meštrović Gallery =

- Galerija Meštrović
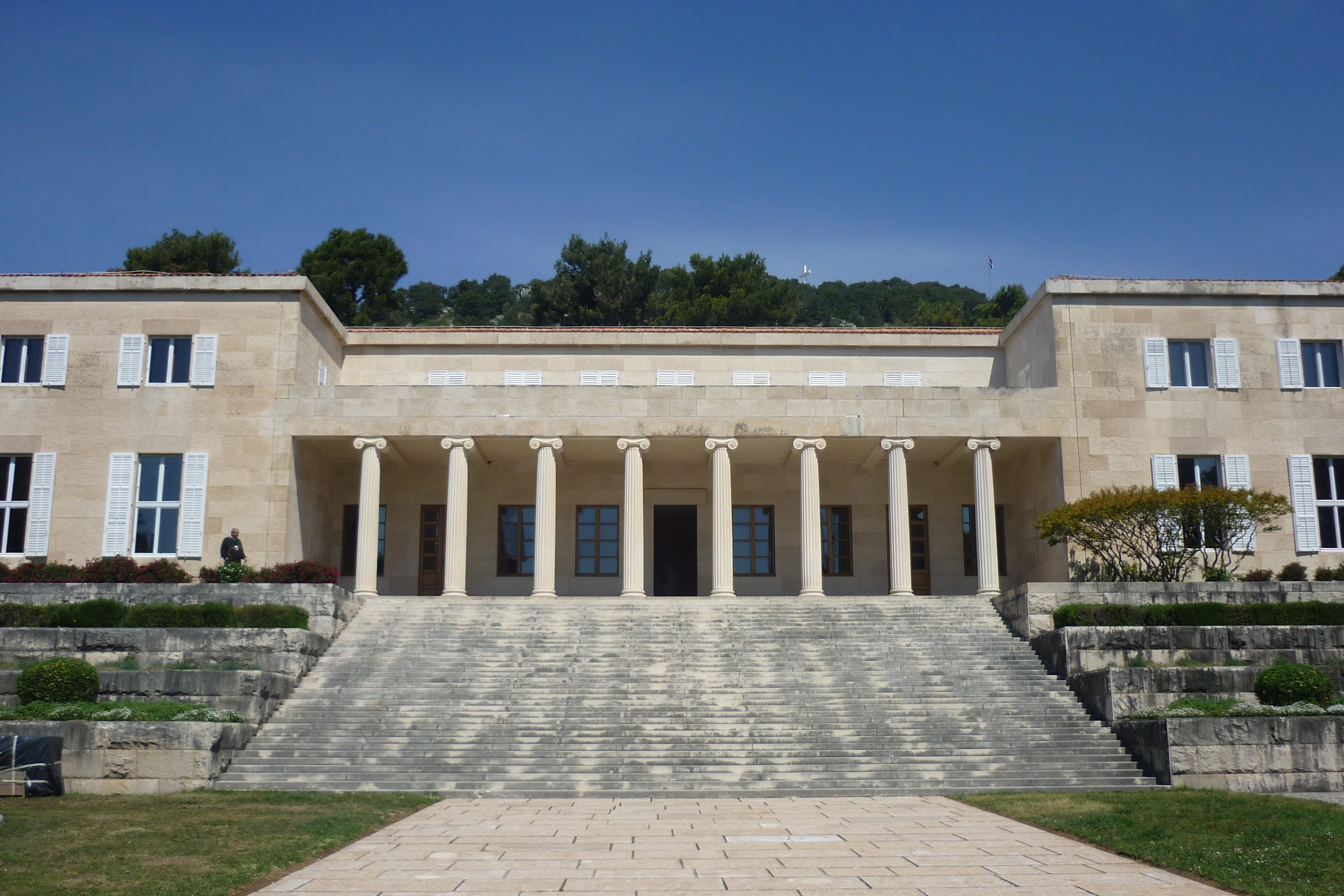
- Gallery entrance
- Established: 1952
- Location: Šetalište Ivana Meštrovića 46, 21000 Split
- Coordinates: 43°30′15.5″N 16°25′4.5″E
- Type: Gallery
- Visitors: 36,902 (2024)
- Director: Sandra Grčić Budimir
- Curator: Iris Marinović
- Website: mestrovic.hr

Ivan Meštrović Gallery (Croatian: Galerija Meštrović), is an art museum in Split, Croatia dedicated to the work of the 20th-century sculptor, Ivan Meštrović. The gallery preserves and presents to the public the most significant works of Meštrović, and is in itself an art monument. The permanent collection includes works of sculpture, drawings, design, furniture and architecture. Holdings include original plaster models by the artist, as well as finished works in bronze, marble and wood. The gallery building and grounds were based on original plans by Meštrović himself, and included living and working areas, as well as exhibition spaces.

Not far from the gallery lies Kaštelet-Crikvine, a restored chapel that houses a set of wooden wall panels carved by Ivan Meštrović.

== History ==
Ivan Meštrović bought a piece of land on the Marjan peninsula west of Split in the 1920s, where he intended to build a summer home. The villa was built between 1931 and 1939 to an original design by Meštrović himself, and he was involved right though its construction. The architects Harold Bilinić and Lavoslav Horvat developed the plans, and builder Marin Marasović was in charge of construction. The building and its grounds overlooking the Adriatic Sea were designed to fulfill three purposes: as a family home, working studio and exhibit space. The Meštrović family stayed in the villa from the summer of 1932 until 1941, when Meštrović left for Zagreb. Letters from that time are in the archives of the gallery.

In 1952, Ivan Meštrović donated the property, along with three others, and 132 of his art works to the state, making possible the founding of the Ivan Meštrović Gallery. Initially administered by the Conservation Institute for Dalmatia, in 1955 it was placed under the Culture and Education Department of the City of Split. Since 1991, the gallery has been an integral part of the Ivan Meštrović Foundation with its headquarters in Zagreb, and which now administers all four donated properties.

The gallery's mission, as defined in the first Statute (6 May 1958) are the "protection, collection, expert and scholarly treatment and presentation of the museum holdings and popularization of Ivan Meštrović's works and name".

The initial gallery holdings contained 70 sculptures, specifically listed by the artist and selected to be placed in the museum of his works in Split and in the nearby Kaštelet-Crikvine complex. In time, those holdings grew through purchases, exchanges, casting in bronze and stone sculptures from plaster models, and further donations from the artist himself, his heirs, and other donors.

The gallery was closed for the public for many years, partly due to its rather dilapidated condition, but also due to the Croatian War of Independence in the 1990s. After an extensive renovation, the new permanent display was opened on 18 May 1998. The gallery exhibits most of the sculptor's works within its permanent display, but in addition, the building itself is an artistic monument. Ivan Meštrović had planned the villa primarily as a family home and working studio, so the conversion into a complete museum space required some modification, while still retaining the original character of the halls and rooms.

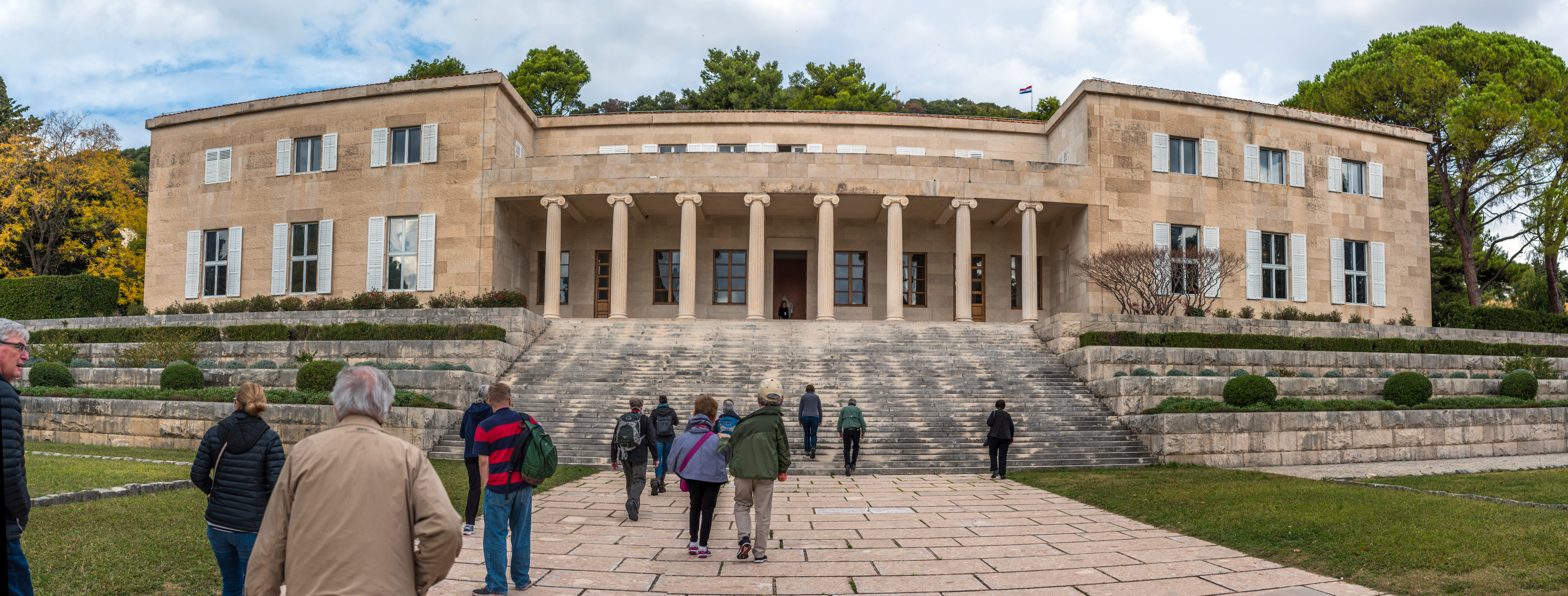
Gallery's garden and entrance, 2017

== Collection ==
The gallery's holdings today contain 192 sculptures, 583 drawings, 4 paintings, 291 architectural plans (almost entirely made by Ivan Meštrović and dating between 1898 and 1961), and 2 furniture sets, one of which is made according to Meštrović's sketches and is a part of the new permanent display in the former dining room. The Ivan Meštrović Gallery also houses 168 works of art owned by Ivan Meštrović's heirs.

=== Exhibition ===
The permanent exhibition covers two floors of the building, and an outdoor sculpture park. The work is arranged by theme, rather than chronological order, and displayed in a manner consistent with the exhibition space.

On the ground floor, the central hall provides a striking entrance with large, mainly marble statues corresponding with the stone façade, in a formal arrangement. The dining room on the west side retains the authentic character of the artist's home with Meštrović's furniture, paintings, and bronze portraits of the family members. The exhibition hall on the east side is dedicated to religious works, a recurring theme in Meštrović’s art.

Upstairs, the west wing hall is dedicated to early Meštrović works from the secession period, while the east hall displays sculptures made mostly between the two World Wars. A special side room is dedicated to the theme of Job. The large central hall houses sculpture, and is also used for special events. The first floor display also includes drawings by Meštrović.

In total, the gallery houses 86 sculptures and reliefs in marble, bronze, or wood, 3 oil paintings, and 15 drawings. A further 8 bronze sculptures are exhibited in the park in front of the building, and 2 sculptures and 28 wooden reliefs are displayed in nearby Kaštelet-Crikvine.

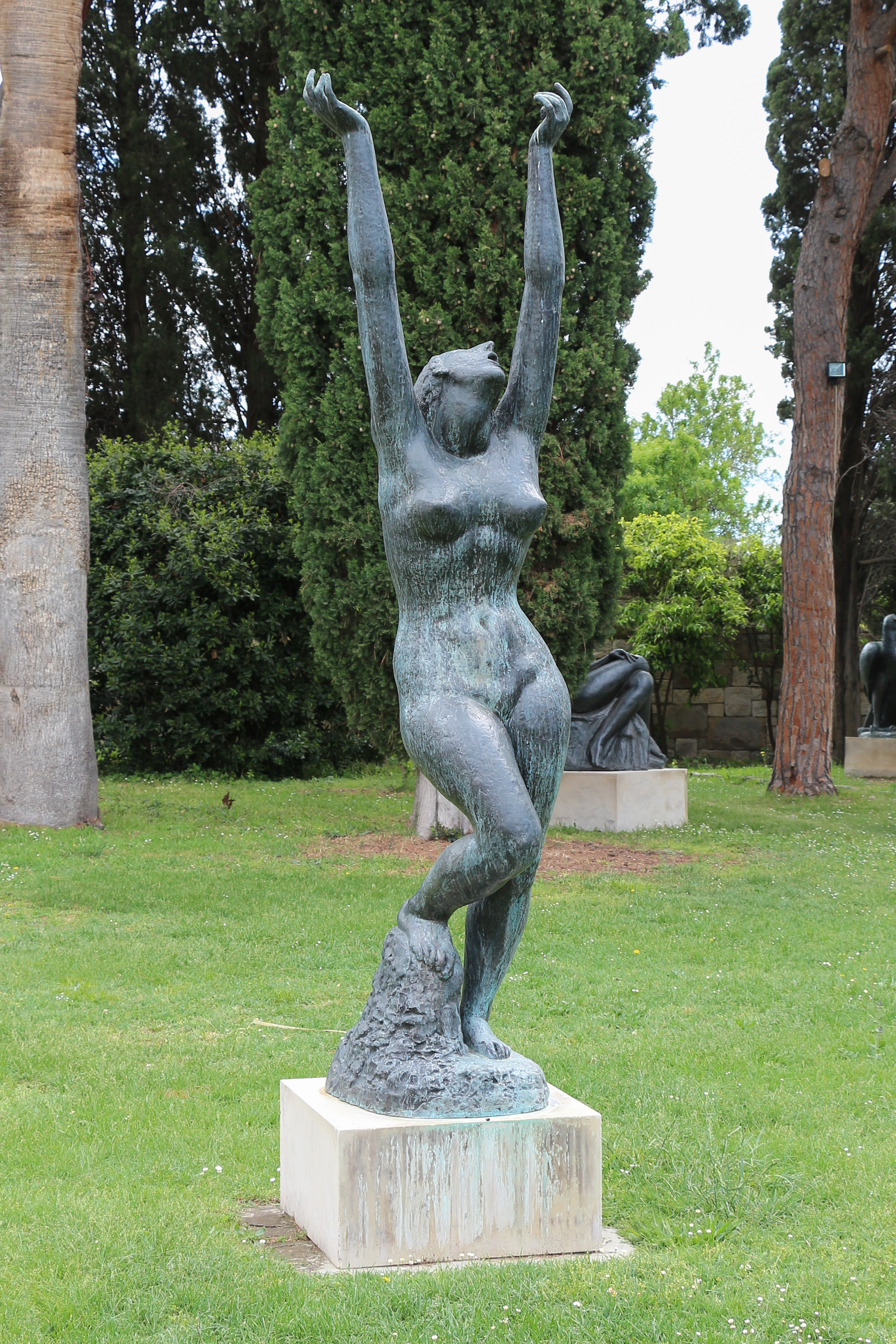
Persephone

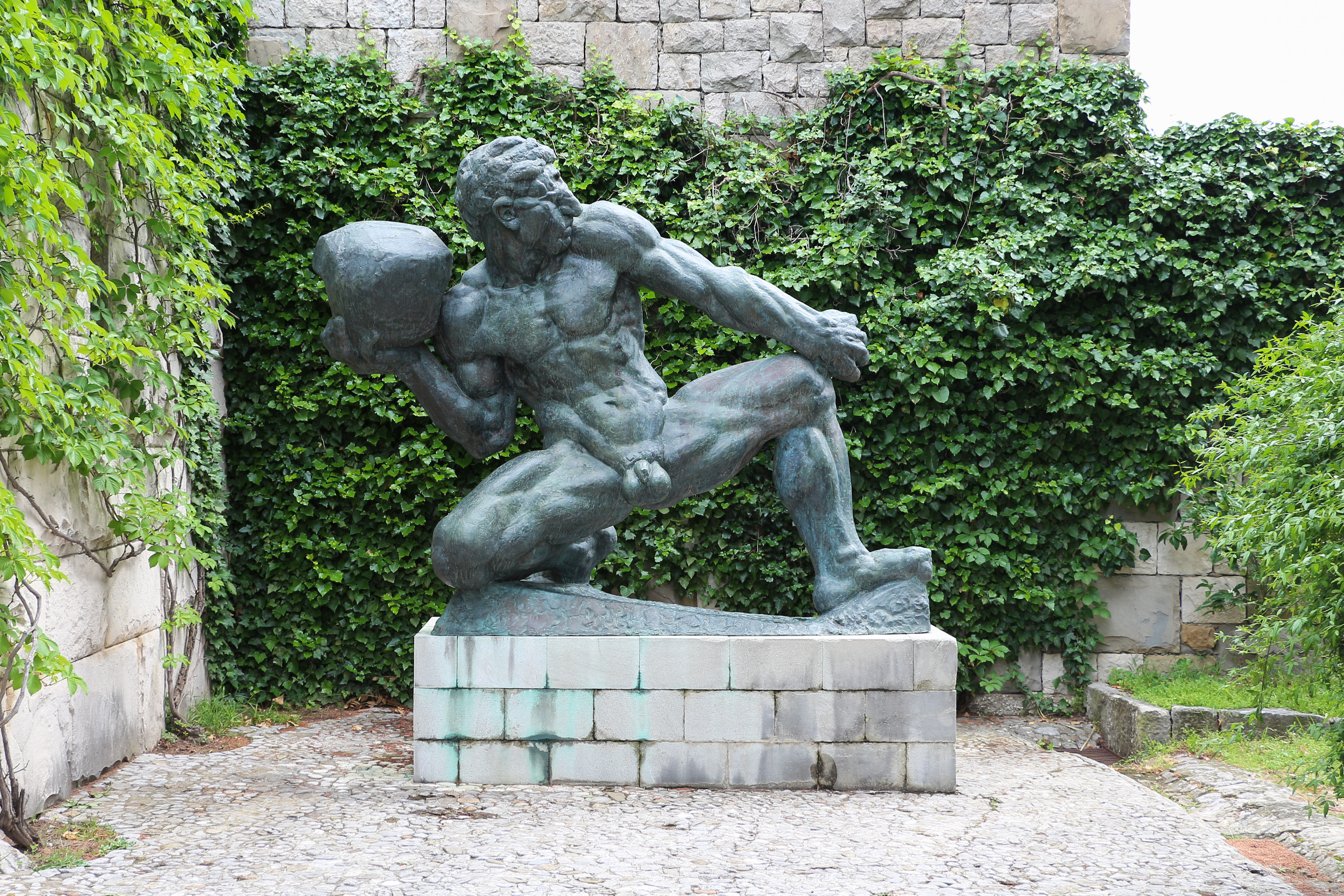
Cyclops

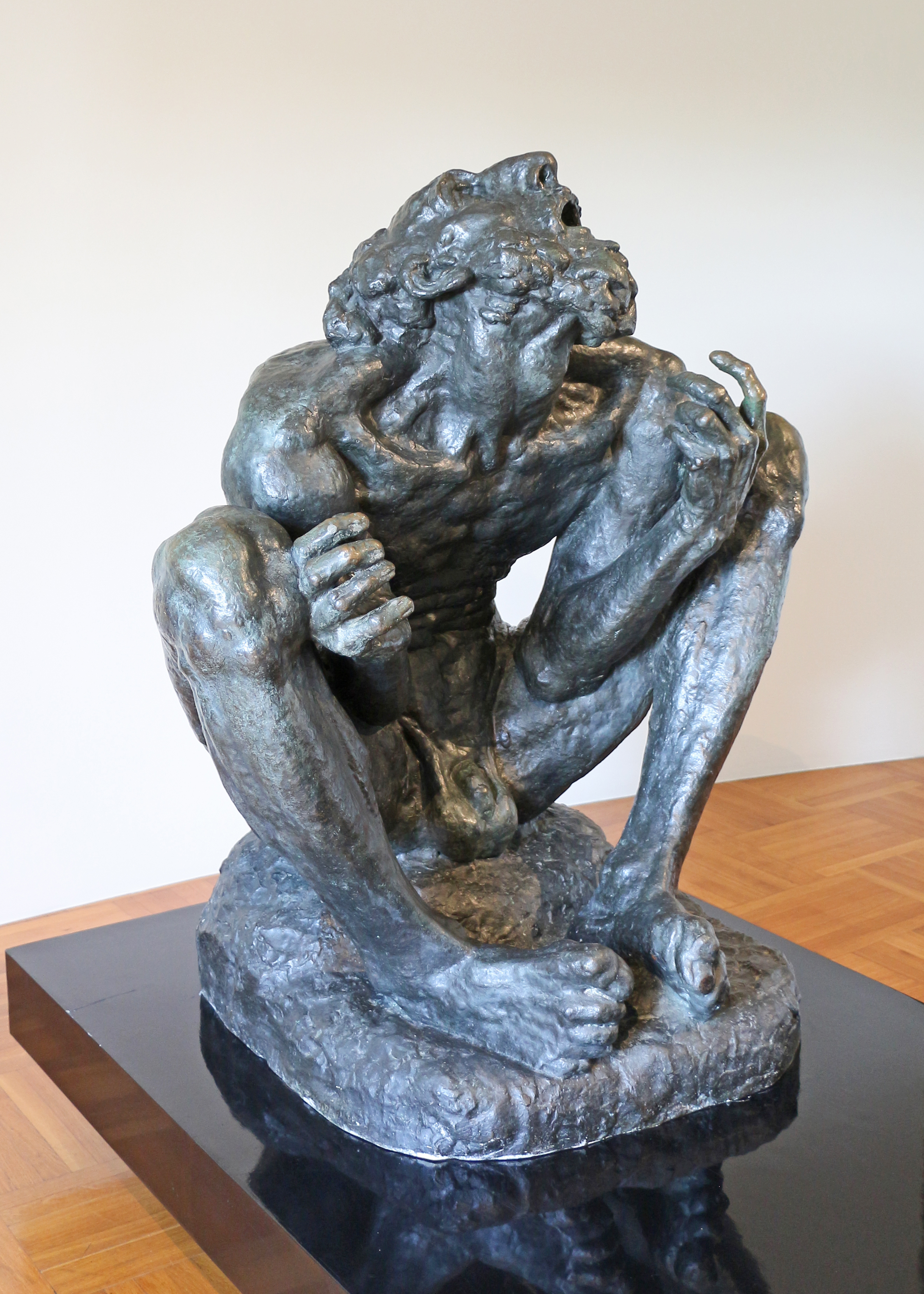
Job

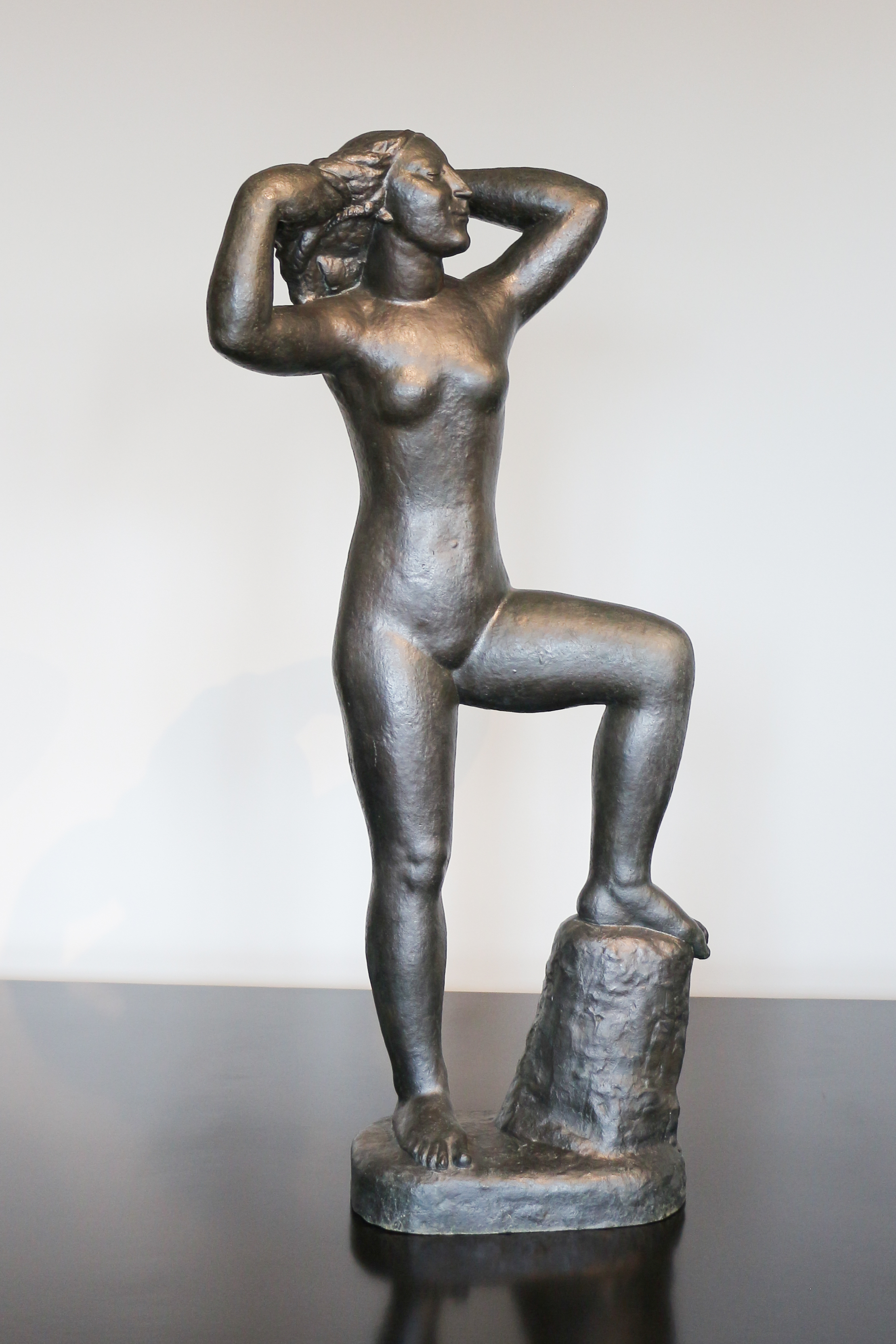
Dancer

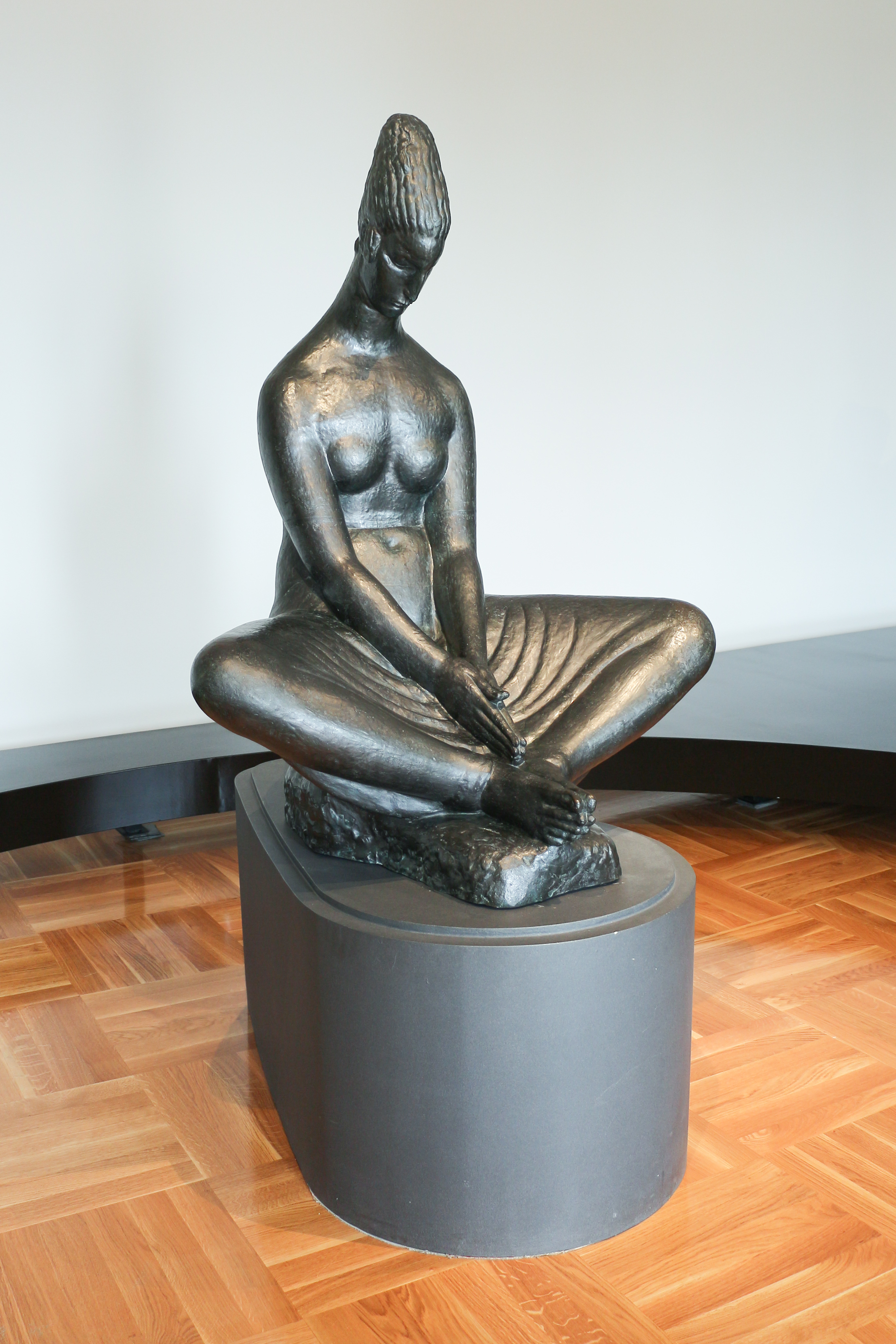
Vestal

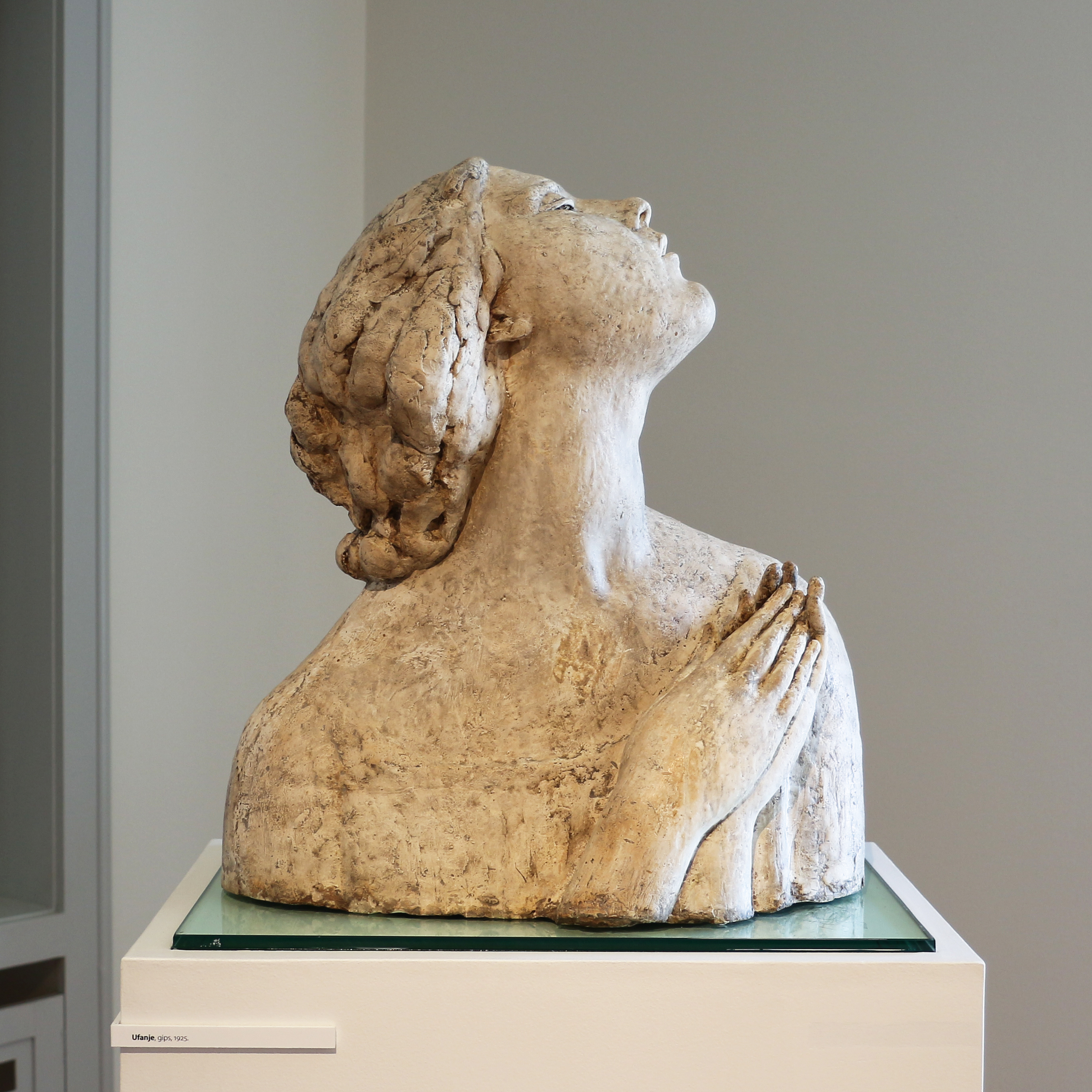
Bust of a woman

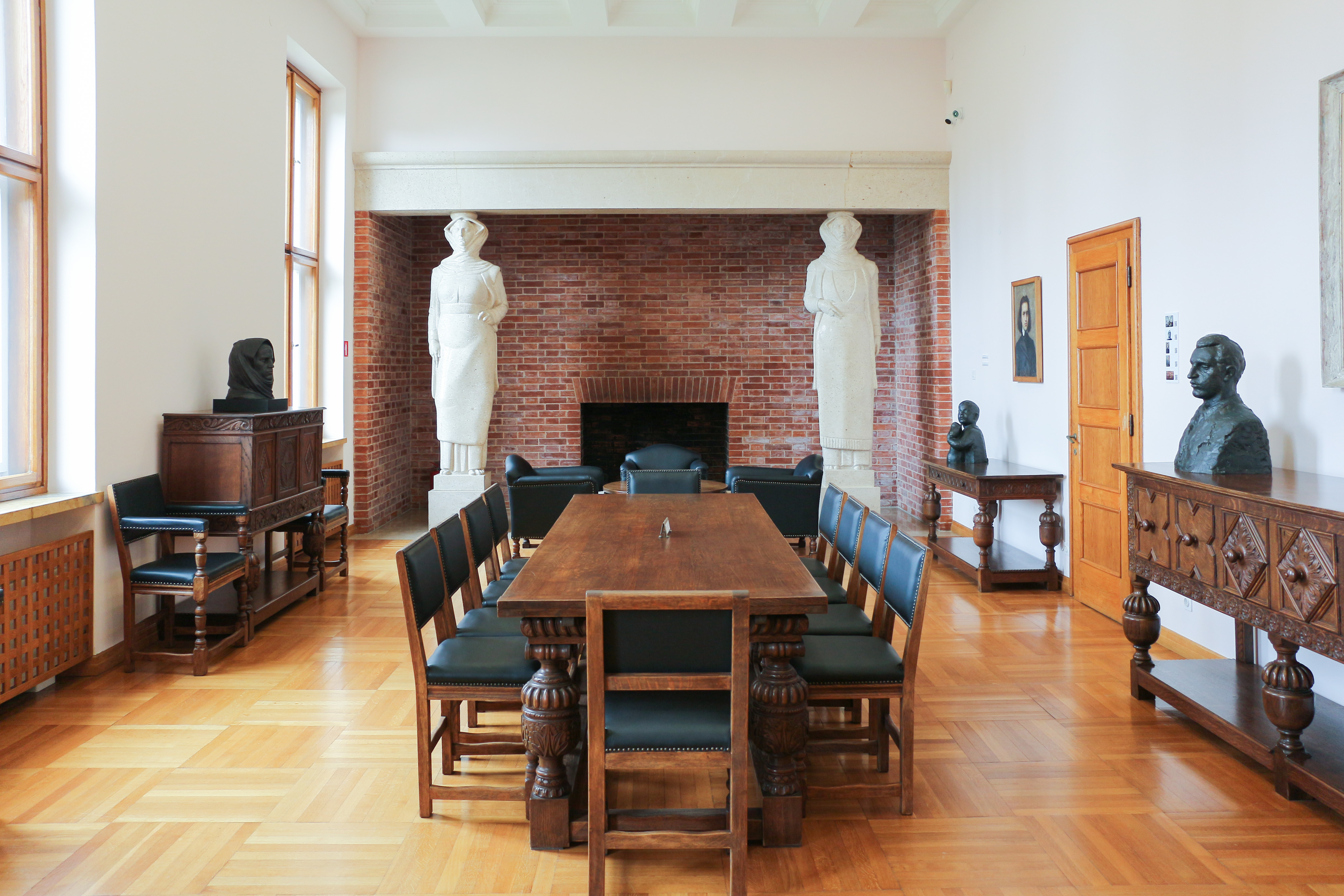
The dining room

=== Documentation archive ===
In addition to the art collection, the Meštrović Atelier in Zagreb and the Ivan Meštrović Gallery in Split both possess extensive archives and substantial collected documentation (publications, letters, manuscripts, newspaper articles, photographs, films, contracts) directly or indirectly relating to Ivan Meštrović, his life and work, the artistic environment he worked in, and the overall context of his activities. The authentic material from the artist's time is an especially valuable portion of the archive in the Ivan Meštrović Gallery in Split.

== See also ==
- List of museums in Croatia
