= Saint Luke (Meštrović) =

Sculpture in Notre Dame, Indiana, US

St. Luke
- Artist: Ivan Meštrović
- Year: 1957
- Type: Bronze and concrete
- Dimensions: 170 cm × 110 cm × 110 cm (65 in × 43 in × 43 in); 65x43x43
- Location: University of Notre Dame, Notre Dame, Indiana, United States; 41°42′0.8695″N 86°14′9.5895″W
- Owner: University of Notre Dame

St. Luke is an outdoor sculpture by Croatian artist Ivan Meštrović (born 1883). It is located on the courtyard in front of O’Shaughnessy Hall on the University of Notre Dame campus, which is in South Bend, Indiana, and is owned by the University of Notre Dame.

== Description ==
The life-sized sculpture, made of bronze, depicts St. Luke the Evangelist seated with his left foot propped up on a rock and cupping his chin with his hand. He holds a stylus in his right hand, atop a tablet balanced on his right knee. The sculpture of St. Luke, completed in 1957, is one part of a collection of four total figures located outside of O’Shaughnessy Hall on the south quad of the campus of Notre Dame. The collection includes sculptures of Christ and the Samaritan Woman, St. Luke and St. John. The pedestal it rests on is concrete.

== Catholic inspiration ==
St. Luke is the writer of the Gospel and the Acts of the Apostles, who has been identified with St. Paul's "Luke, the beloved physician" (Colossians 4:14). According to the early Church historian named Eusebius, Luke was born at Antioch in Syria. The collection as a whole illustrates, in St. John's Chapter 4 in the Gospel, the story of Jesus and the Samaritan woman. "One day Jesus was walking to Galilee with His disciples, who continued on into the nearby Samaritan town while Jesus waited for them at Jacob’s Well. In the heat of the day, a local woman came to draw water, and she was surprised when Jesus requested a drink from her—a despised non-believer. He revealed such remarkable knowledge, even of her own life, that she asked if He were the Messiah, and He replied that He was. She hurried away, whereupon the disciples rejoined Jesus, dismayed that He had conversed with a woman of the scorned sect."

== Influence of war ==
Ivan Meštrović supported Croatia's liberationist movement against Italy's attempts to seize parts of Dalmatia, Croatia in World War I. The more popular Ivan Meštrović became, the more his politically charged art put him in danger. At the outbreak of World War I, he was forced to flee Croatia. After fleeing Croatia, Ivan Meštrović became a professor and for 20 years was the director of the Art Institute of Zagreb. Drawing on his own poor upbringing in rural Croatia, he donated all his wages so that poor students could study art. During World War II, Hitler invited Ivan Meštrović to exhibit in Berlin, but Ivan Meštrović declined and was arrested and imprisoned for five months. This time allowed him to plan future religious sculptures that would later help him deal with his sadness about the war. The vatican petitioned and won the release of Ivan Meštrović, who then lived in Rome for a time. Ivan Meštrović did not want to go back to Yugoslavia where Marshall Tito had invited him back to. Instead, he became a professor at Syracuse University in 1947. While in New York, Ivan Meštrović had his own exhibit at the Metropolitan Museum of Art, the first one-man show to ever take place there. Syracuse University is the last place Ivan Meštrović lived before coming to the University of Notre Dame.

== Ivan Meštrović at Notre Dame ==
St. Luke In 1955, President of the University of Notre Dame Theodore Hesburgh, invited Ivan Meštrović to come to Notre Dame where he produced 24 total works in mediums of wood, marble, bronze, as well as oil paintings.

Rev. Anthony J. Lauck, CSC, founding director of the Snite Museum, chair of the art department, and a sculptor, encouraged Hesburgh to bring the renowned artist to Notre Dame.

Ivan Meštrović's presence is a lasting one at the University of Notre Dame, not only because of his numerous works spread around campus, but because he was a professor in residence for seven years at Notre Dame before he died in 1962, teaching the students who went on to create pieces influenced by his teachings. Moving to the Catholic University of Notre Dame from his previous residency at Syracuse University allowed Ivan Meštrović to sculpt more religious pieces that demonstrated his love for the Catholic faith of his homeland, Croatia.

== Style ==
"Many of his best works possess just such a rough, almost primitive, quality designed to dominate the viewer." After the war, he chose to sculpt more about religion and his folk culture. This style remained consistent, with no significant changes to the end of his career. His work remained both classical and modern.

== Condition ==
Bronze sculptures used to be known for their durability, but a changing world environment has "imperiled outdoor bronze sculptures". The St. Luke sculpture has taken on a lighter, almost blue and green color to it, likely from the copper that used to be used on the surface of bronze sculptures.
