= Well of Life (sculpture) =

Sculpture in Zagreb, Croatia

Coordinates: 45°48′36″N 15°58′12″E

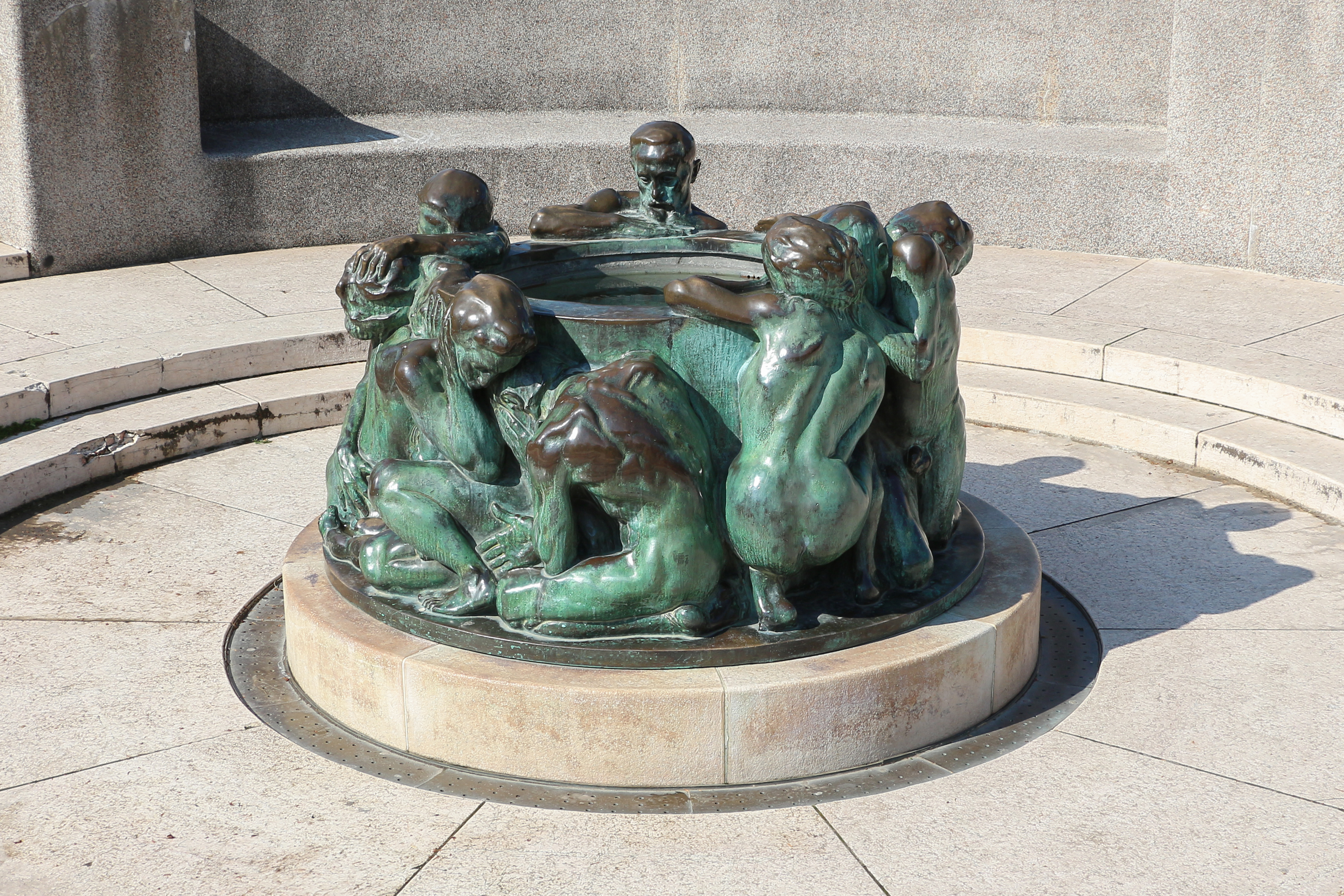
- Artist: Ivan Meštrović
- Year: 1905
- Type: Bronze
- Dimensions: 125 cm (49 in)
- Location: Zagreb

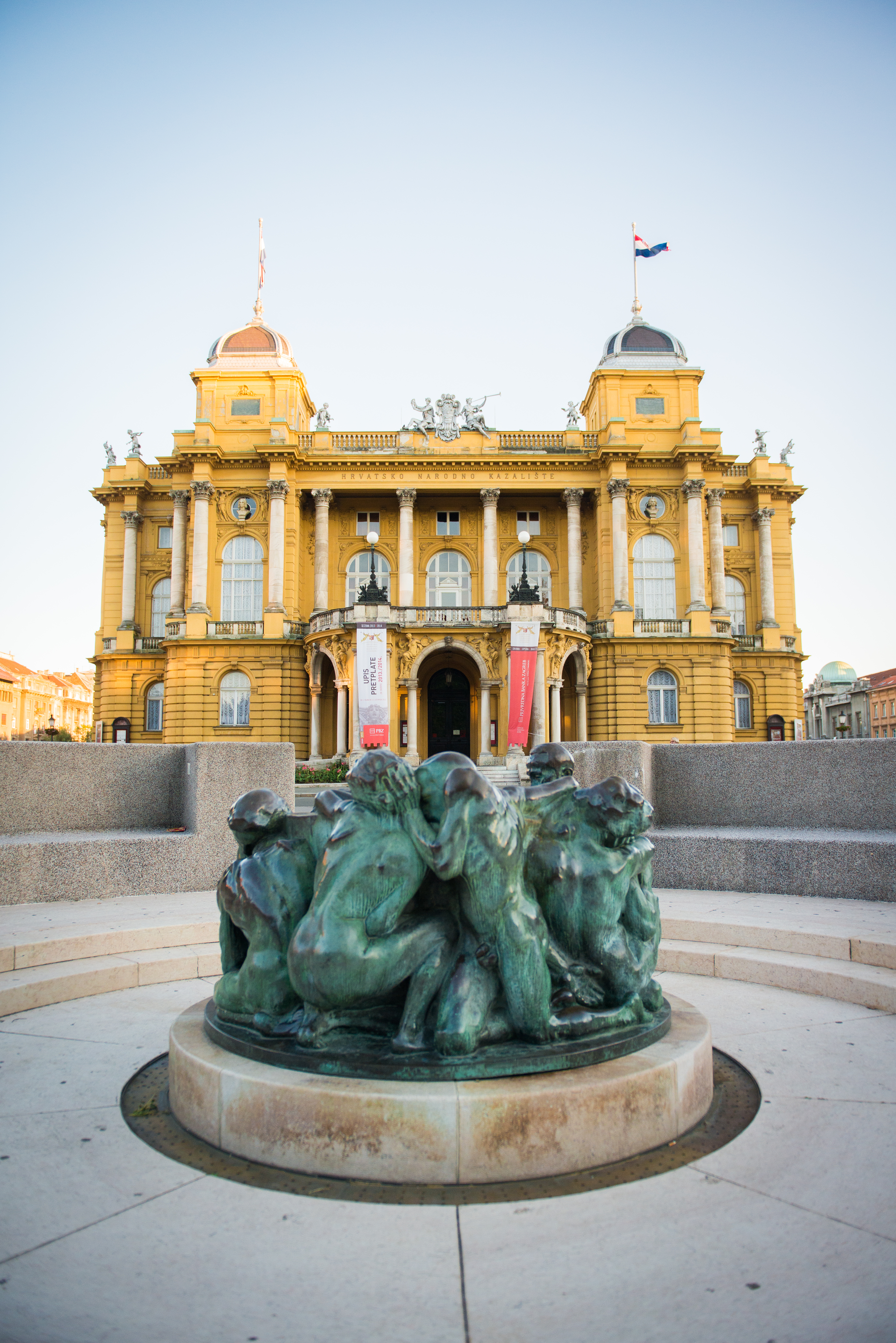
Well of Life in front of Croatian National Theatre in Zagreb

The Well of Life (sometimes also At the Well of Life or the Fountain of Life; Croatian: Zdenac života) is a sculpture by the Croatian sculptor and architect Ivan Meštrović installed in front of the Croatian National Theatre on Republic of Croatia Square in Zagreb, Croatia. It depicts people in various phases of life who crouch and twist their bodies around a well which symbolizes life, youth, and the source of eternal beauty.

== Description ==
The sculpture is circular with relief of ten naked figures, a child, a love couple and the old man, life-size, that crouch and twist their bodies around a well which contains water. Strong facial expressions of the figures show the joy of life which alternated rhythmically makes the life cycle. The figures are watching their reflections in the water, while their bodies appear to have been frozen in motion. The figures are arranged so that they show to viewer the purpose of the well, i.e., desire for life and joy, which can be seen best in young characters who are hugging and kissing as opposed to the old man who is at the end of his life and looks with grief into the well, a symbol of life. The sculpture depicts man's natural cycle, from birth to death.

The sculpture is smooth and rounded with no sharp edges or regular geometric forms. It is made of bronze, whose dark color is in great contrast to the whiteness of the rock on which it is placed. The transitions between light and shadow are mild. The sculpture is both convex and concave.

Auguste Rodin's influence on Meštrović can be seen in this sculpture. As art historian professor Ljiljana Čerina says, "With its shimmering surface treatment of the body, Meštrović brings Rodin's impressionism into the Vienna Secession which proves that he is rodinist among secessionists, while later in Paris he proves that he is secessionist among rodinists."

== Exhibition ==
Sculpture was made in 1905, and was exhibited in 1909 in the author's gallery in Ilica street no. 12. In year 1912, sculpture was bought by Izidor Kršnjavi and installed on the Republic of Croatia Square. It was placed in the cavity surrounded by walls so that naked bodies on it would not cause astonishment and critical comments of, at the time, conservative people of Zagreb. In correspondence with Ante Trumbić, Meštrović clearly expressed his wish that Well of Life should be placed in Split.
