= FEST (film festival) =

Annual film festival in Belgrade, Serbia

Belgrade FEST
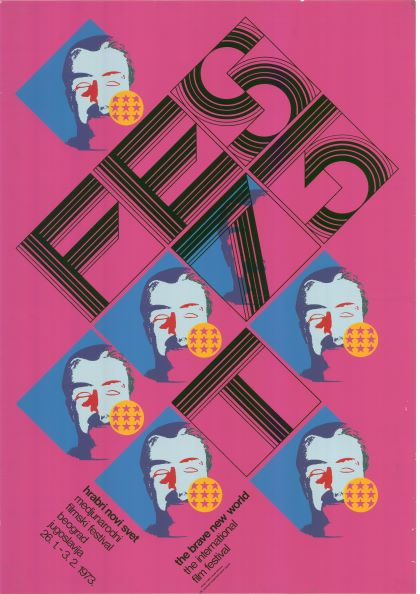
- Showbill for 1973 Belgrade FEST
- Location: Belgrade, Serbia
- Founded: 1971; 55 years ago
- Founded by: Politika newspaper
- Awards: Belgrade Victor
- Artistic director: Jugoslav Pantelić
- Language: International
- Website: www.fest.rs
- 2026 2025

The Belgrade International Film Festival, better known as FEST, is an annual film festival held in Belgrade. It is the largest and most prominent film festival in Serbia and Southeastern Europe. The festival was founded by the Politika newspaper in 1971 at the behest of film critic Milutin Čolić.

The festival is held annually in the first quarter of the year. It presents the latest foreign and Serbian works. Since 2015, festival has a competitive program. The festival program is divided into the main program and the national program. The competition on the national program is one of the most important film competitions of the Serbian cinema.

During socialism, it was the only festival held in a socialist country that hosted Hollywood stars and stars of Western European cinema. At that time, he experienced his greatest success. At the 1977 festival, 252,332 tickets were sold. It has been held every year since 1971, except for 1993 and 1994, and it was not held in 1997 in support for student protests.

The best authors and achievements are awarded with the Belgrade Victor.

== History ==
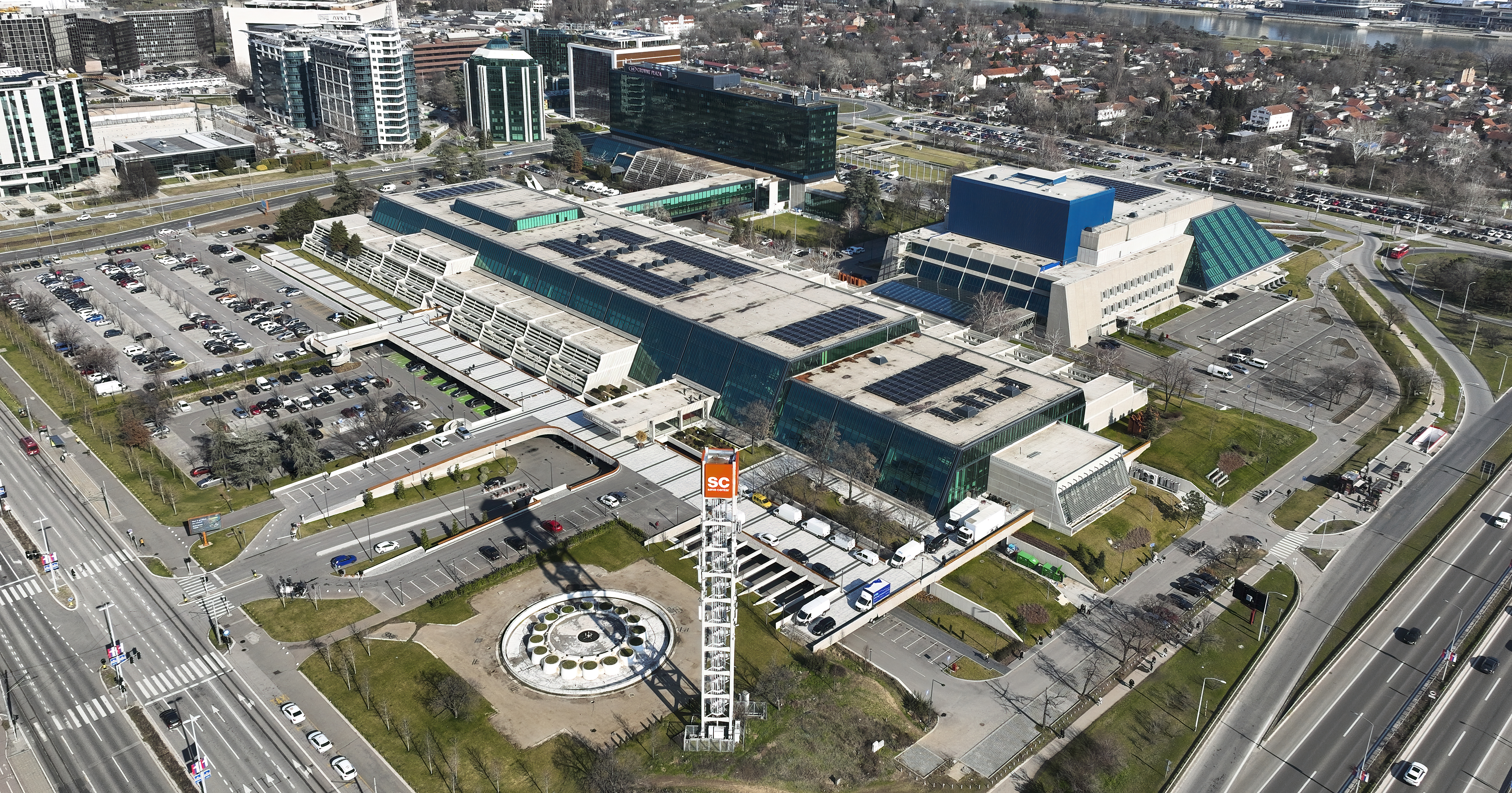
Sava Centre in Belgrade, the main venue of the festival

FEST was first held in 1971. It was the only film festival in socialist countries that attracted big Hollywood stars such as Jack Nicholson, Kirk Douglas, Robert De Niro, Dennis Hopper, Peter Fonda and famous directors like Miloš Forman, Francis Ford Coppola, Roman Polanski, Sam Peckinpah, and Pier Paolo Pasolini.

The festival's significance declined in the 1990s, mostly due to the international embargo FR Yugoslavia was under at the time. In 1993 and 1994, it was not held, and in 1997, it was interrupted in protest against police brutality taking place against student protesters.

In 2007, 98,191 tickets were sold for around 80 films. In 2007, it was opened by actress Catherine Deneuve and in 2009 by actor Ralph Fiennes.

As of 2024 it is also referred to as the Belgrade International Film Festival FEST, or FEST – Belgrade International Film Festival. In 2024, the festival took place across seven locations across Belgrade.

== Awards ==
A series of awards known as the Belgrade Victor awards are awarded at the festival. These include the Belgrade Victor for Outstanding Contribution to Film Art, Belgrade Victor for Creative Achievement, and the top prize, the Belgrade Victor for Best Film. There are also occasional honorary awards known as the Belgrade Victors for Best Contribution to World Cinema.

Other awards include the Nebojša Đukelić Award, Milutin Čolić Award, FEDEORA Award, and an Audience Award.

== B2B Belgrade Industry Meetings ==
In 2006, B2B Belgrade Industry Meetings were established as a part of FEST. Program and business focus of B2B are cinematographies of the Europe out of Europe countries. B2B focuses on production, authors and films with the origin geographically in Europe, but still not enough intensely included in European integrative currents, also in countries outside Europe with strong European influence and heritage.
