= Monument of Gratitude to France =

Monument in Belgrade, Serbia

Coordinates: 44.8212°N 20.4512°E

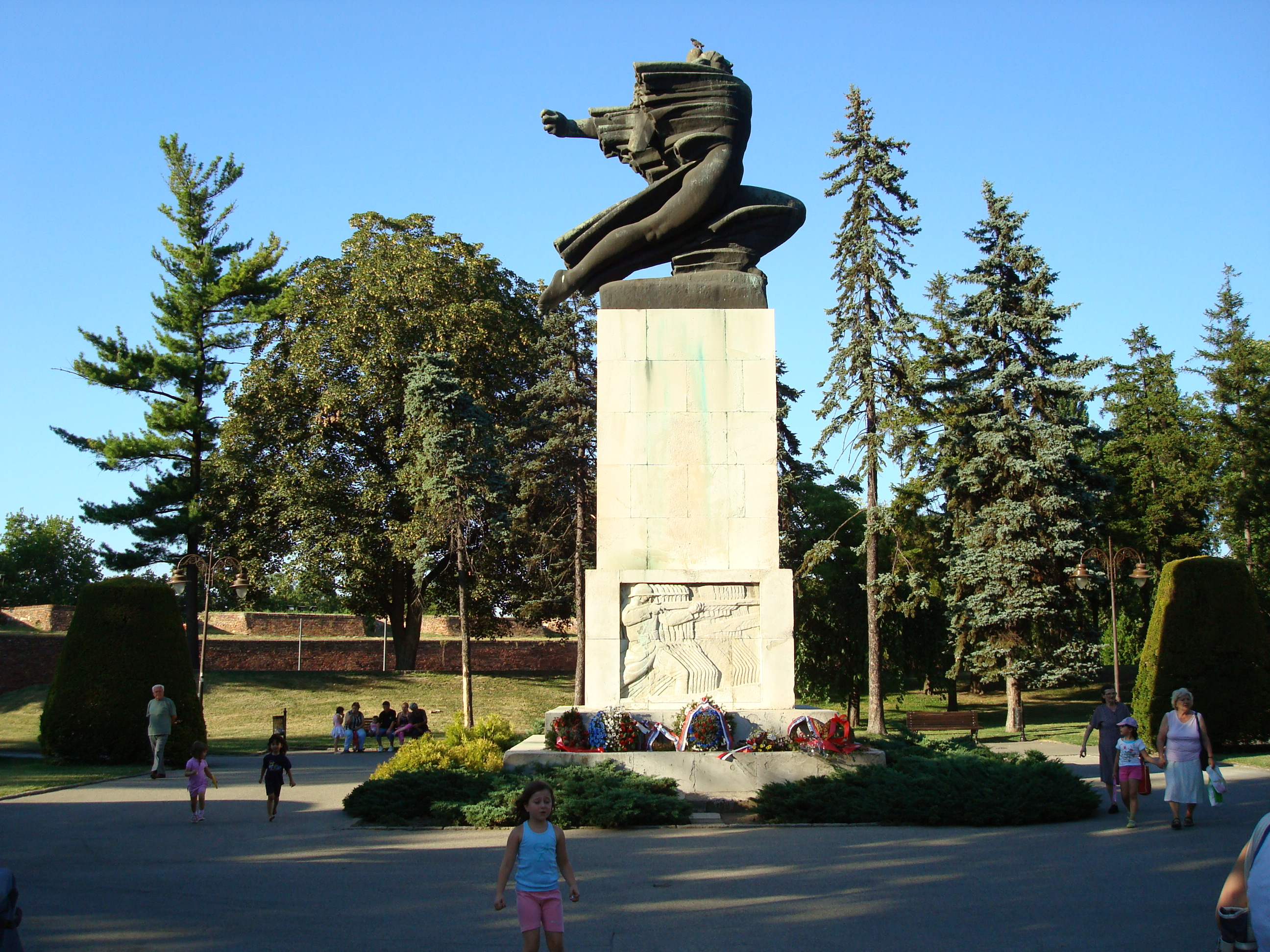
Monument of Gratitude to France in Kalemegdan Park, Belgrade

Monument of Gratitude to France (Serbian: Споменик захвалности Француској, romanized: Spomenik zahvalnosti Francuskoj) in Belgrade's Veliki Kalemegdan Park was formally unveiled on 11 November 1930, the 12th anniversary of the end of the First World War, in the presence of King Alexander and Queen Maria, the royal government, the delegation of the French government, Serbian war veterans, distinguished citizens, associations, schools, and a large crowd of people.

It was noted as one of the first "public monuments on one national territory, where the perception of another (nation) is shown in positive light". It was declared a cultural monument in 1965, and a cultural monument of great significance in 1983.

== History ==
=== Origin ===
In the decisive days of the war after the epic battles of the Serbian Army, its perilous withdrawal across Albania and the almost inconceivable feat of breaching the enemy lines on the Salonika front, a military alliance and friendship between two countries had been forged. After the war, Serbian intellectuals gathered around the Association of French Schools Alumni and the Society of Friends of France initiated erection, in Belgrade or Paris, of a monument to France, as a token of gratitude for her military and educational aid during and after the war, and of the friendship built in the days of greatest trials.

After the war, the Kingdom of Serbia ceased existing as such, becoming part of a newly created complex state, the Kingdom of Serbs, Croats and Slovenes, subsequently Yugoslavia, and Belgrade, as its capital, saw a period of reconstruction and embellishment. On 17 December 1921 Belgrade City Council made the decision to erect a gratitude and honor memorial to the French soldiers who had lost their lives defending Belgrade in 1915. The French Schools Alumni and the Society of Friends of France started the official initiative in May 1924. In the summer of 1924 the Committee for Erecting a Monument chaired by Niko Miljanić, a physician, one of the founders of the Belgrade University School of Medicine, was set up. The Committee succeeded in raising considerable funds within a short span of time.

=== Location selection ===
Large amounts of money were raised because the original plan was for the monument to be built in Paris. The permission was asked from the Parisian Municipal Council, which granted the erection of the monument thanks to the mediation of Émile Dard, French ambassador to Belgrade. After the war, the Kingdom of Serbia ceased existing as such, becoming part of a newly created complex state, the Kingdom of Serbs, Croats and Slovenes, subsequently Yugoslavia. However, French diplomacy preferred the monument to be built in the newly formed state, expecting that Yugoslavia will become a major exponent of French politics in this part of Europe. Dard was then ordered to convince the Serbian side to build the monument in Belgrade, and was successful. Historically, it was a "time when French influences became the domineering component of cultural, economic and political life in the capital of the newly formed Yugoslav state".

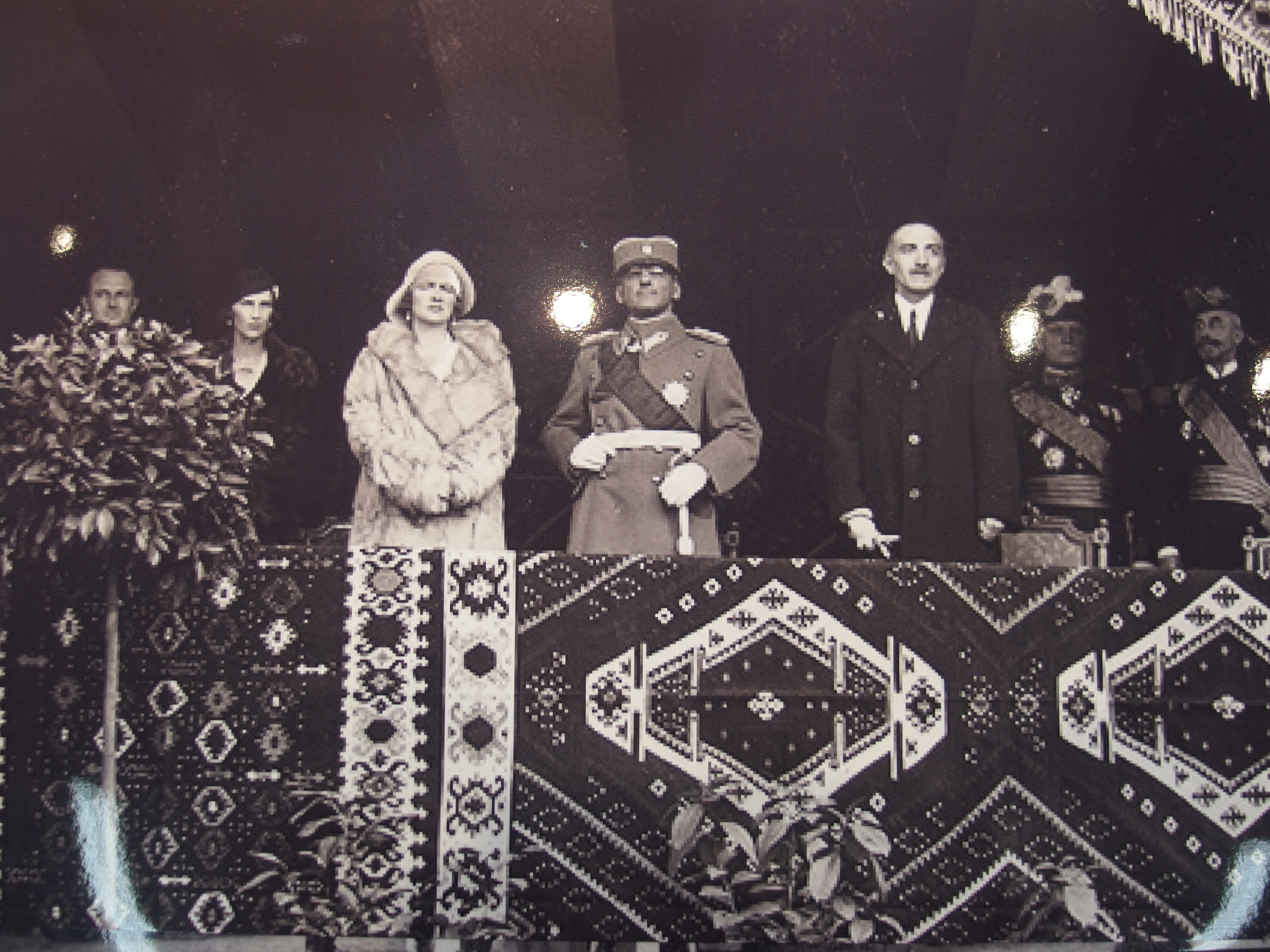
King Alexander I of Yugoslavia and queen Maria at the inauguration of the monument

In 1928, the City Council of Belgrade allocated a parcel of land in Kalemegdan, formerly possessed by the Army, for the monument: “in the most beautiful part of Kalemegdan Park, which commands one of the most beautiful European landscapes, and in the vicinity of which the home of France will be rising soon” (the French embassy built in 1928–32). France responded to this gesture by setting up monuments to King Peter I the Liberator and King Alexander I the Unifier in Paris, memorials in Orleans and Marseilles, and by naming one of central Paris avenues after King Peter I of Serbia. These initiatives weren't state ones, though, but also initiated by various private organizations. Monuments to Serbian kings were built 6 years after the monument in Belgrade was dedicated.

The chosen spot was a location of the former Karađorđe monument, and was recently cleared. The monument was set up in the vicinity of Karađorđe's Gate of the Fortress of Belgrade, on the former site of the monument to the leader of the First Serbian Resurrection against Ottoman rule, Karađorđe, erected by the Ministry of War in 1913, after the victories in the Balkan Wars, to mark the 100th anniversary of the creation of a regular Serbian army by Karađorđe. In 1916 the occupying Austro-Hungarian force blew up the monument with dynamite in order to replace it with a colossal bronze statue of Franz Joseph. After the liberation of Belgrade, this statue was found on a Sava barge, melted down and reused for bells for Serbian Orthodox churches, the largest of which was donated to the church popularly known as Ružica, in Kalemegdan. The initiative to erect a monument to Karađorđe launched in 1857 falls among the earliest activities relating to the practice of producing public monuments in Serbia. Meštrović's monument set up in its former place took advantage of the powerful symbolism of the fortress as a battlefield site and its remarkable location above the two rivers, overlooking the national and historical significance of the location originally intended for the memorial to Karađorđe.

The final decision was confirmed in municipal council on 19 September 1930.

=== Making a monument ===
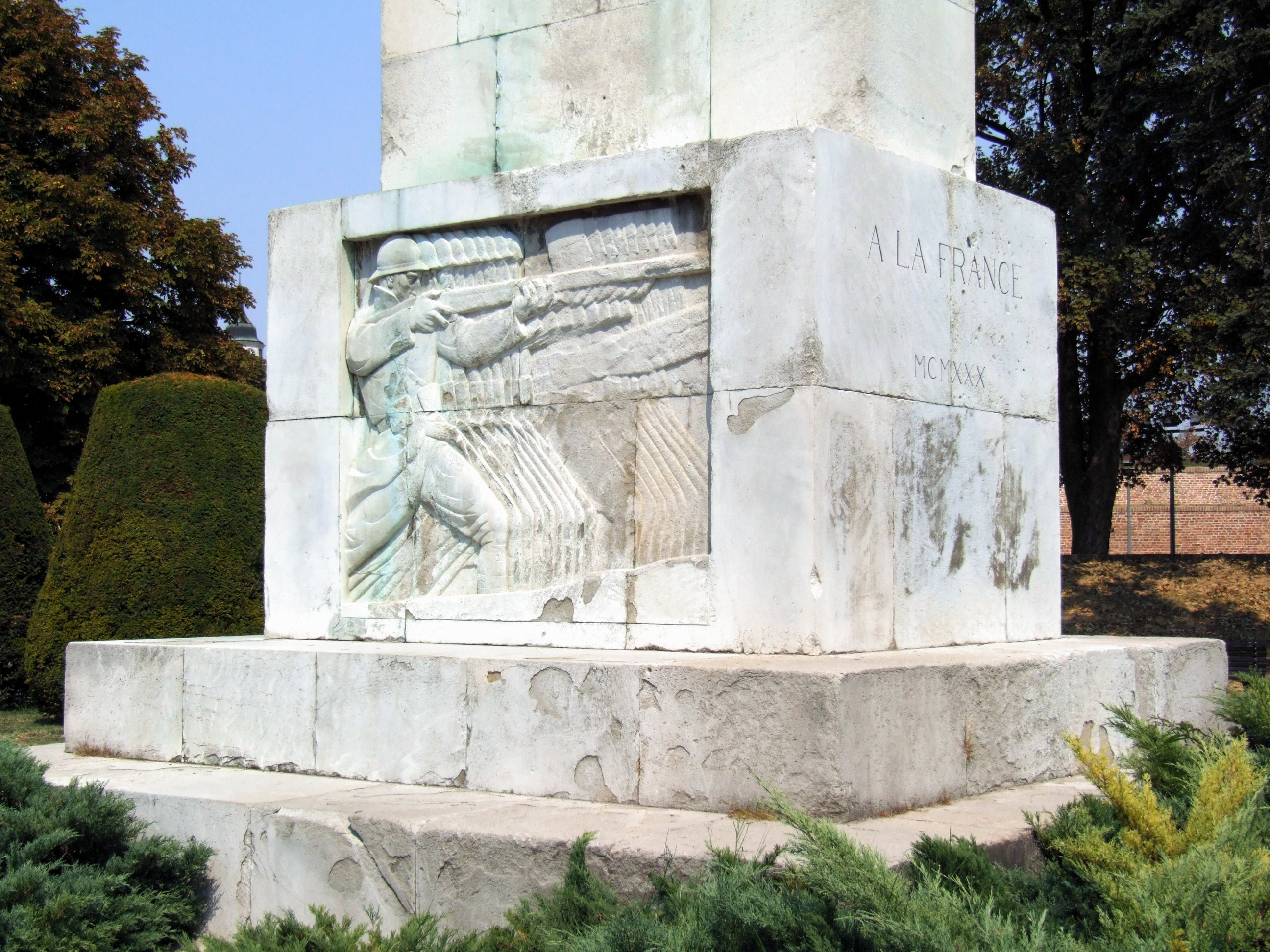
Reliefs "Sorbonne" and "Warriors"

A special commission for choosing the project was formed by the council. The commission was chaired by one of the foremost academics in the state, Bogdan Popović. Popović was also a founder of the French literary society, as a former Parisian student. He was crucial in acquiring the job for a sculptor Ivan Meštrović. At the time, Popović was one of the staunchest defenders of another Meštrović's Belgrade project, publicly opposed the Pobednik monument.

Meštrović worked on the concept and sketches for several months. He opted for the monumental form in the Art Deco style, quite popular at the time: a female figure with massive body, stepping out strongly, with a determinedly extended arm and proudly raised head. As ambassador Dard approved the initial design, Meštrović continued the work in the Artistic Academy in Zagreb, where he was a rector. He first made an alabaster model, followed by the three and a half long casting of the bronze monument, from 3 July to 20 October 1930. The ancient lost-wax casting method was used. The sculpture was cast in 14 pieces which were then composed in 2 and transported to Belgrade. They were connected in situ, on the Kalemegdan.

Concurrently with the casting, another group of Meštrović's associates was working on the pedestal in Split. The two-stepped pedestal was made from the Brač marble. Two side reliefs were made by Meštrović's disciples Frano Kršinić and Antun Augustinčić, upon Meštrović's models. Kršinić carved the "Sorbonne" relief, while Augustinčić made the "Warriors".

=== Dedication ===
Parts of the stone pedestal and two parts of the bronze sculpture arrived in Belgrade in the late October 1930. The setting of the monument lasted for 8 days. The set date was 11 November 1930, the twelfth anniversary of the World War I ending. Two official delegations arrived from France a day earlier by train. One delegation represented French soldiers from the Salonica front while the other was an official, government delegation, headed by minister Auguste Champetier de Ribes.

The 11 November, a Peace Day, was declared a holiday and Belgrade was decorated with French and Yugoslav flags. Crowd of 20,000 gathered in Kalemegdan. Serbian side was represented by the highest officials, including King Alexander, Queen Maria, Prince Paul and Princess Olga. Serbian government was represented by minister Kosta Kumanudi. Bells of the nearby Cathedral Church were ringing, marking the occasion. Meštrović was absent. He claimed to being sick, but didn't notify the organizers. He notified French ambassador Dard instead.

=== 2018 reconstruction ===
Signs of damage to the monument were first discovered in 1963. In November 2017 it was announced that the monument would be revitalized in the second half of 2018. The revitalization was to be funded by both Serbia and France, as stated by the agreement signed by both governments on 25 April 2017. Corrosion had damaged the metal construction, while the stone pedestal had been damaged by atmospheric waters through the cracks on the slab joints. Especially endangered were the two side reliefs ("Sorbonne" and "Warriors"), while the figure itself had a big crack on its right foot which developed in the early 1990s due to the effect of the temperature difference on bronze. Though the project was finished in 2012, the lack of funding delayed the works. The monument was to be reopened on the 100th anniversary of the end of World War I.

In April 2018 the sculpture was removed from the pedestal, and a temporary work room was constructed at the site of the monument in order for the revitalization to occur on the spot, instead of taking parts of the monument to another location. Sculptor Zoran Kuzmanović headed the refurbishment program which included the consolidation, restoration and conservation of the monument. During the removal of the statue, it was discovered that Meštrović, in order to secure the statue, poured 5 tons of concrete into the pedestal which also covered the lower part of the bronze statue. It is believed that this combination caused the pedestal to crack. The concrete had to be broken on top in order to free the sculpture so that it could be removed. Basreliefs on the sides of the pedestal, as well as the inscriptions A la France MCMXXX and We love France as she loved us 1914–1918 had to be carved again, this time in stone imported from Italy. The deadline had been set for 10 August 2018.

During the reconstruction several discoveries were made. There were many cracks, up to 2 cm (0.79 in) long, in the lower section. Concrete partially filled the sculpture so it had to be precisely chiseled. The couplings, as the monument is made from several parts, weren't welded, but instead were riveted and fastened with the bolts. The quality of the bronze used was bad. Instead of having less than 5% of zinc, it contained 13-24%, meaning it had probably been obtained by the melting of cannon shells. The result of an error during the original casting, there are visible remains of over 50 holes on the cast, especially on the thigh section, which were originally filled with the bits of bronze and then forged in situ. It took 2 months to remove the soot from the outer side of the monument. Instead of concrete, the reconstructed monument, will be fastened with a construction built from stainless steel. The original Sorbonne and the Warriors bas-reliefs will be stored in the Museum of Belgrade, while the replicas, done by sculptor Goran Čpajak, will be placed on the monument instead.

The sculpture was returned to its original place by August 10, and by September the area surrounding the pedestal was returned to its original, 1930s look.

== Description ==
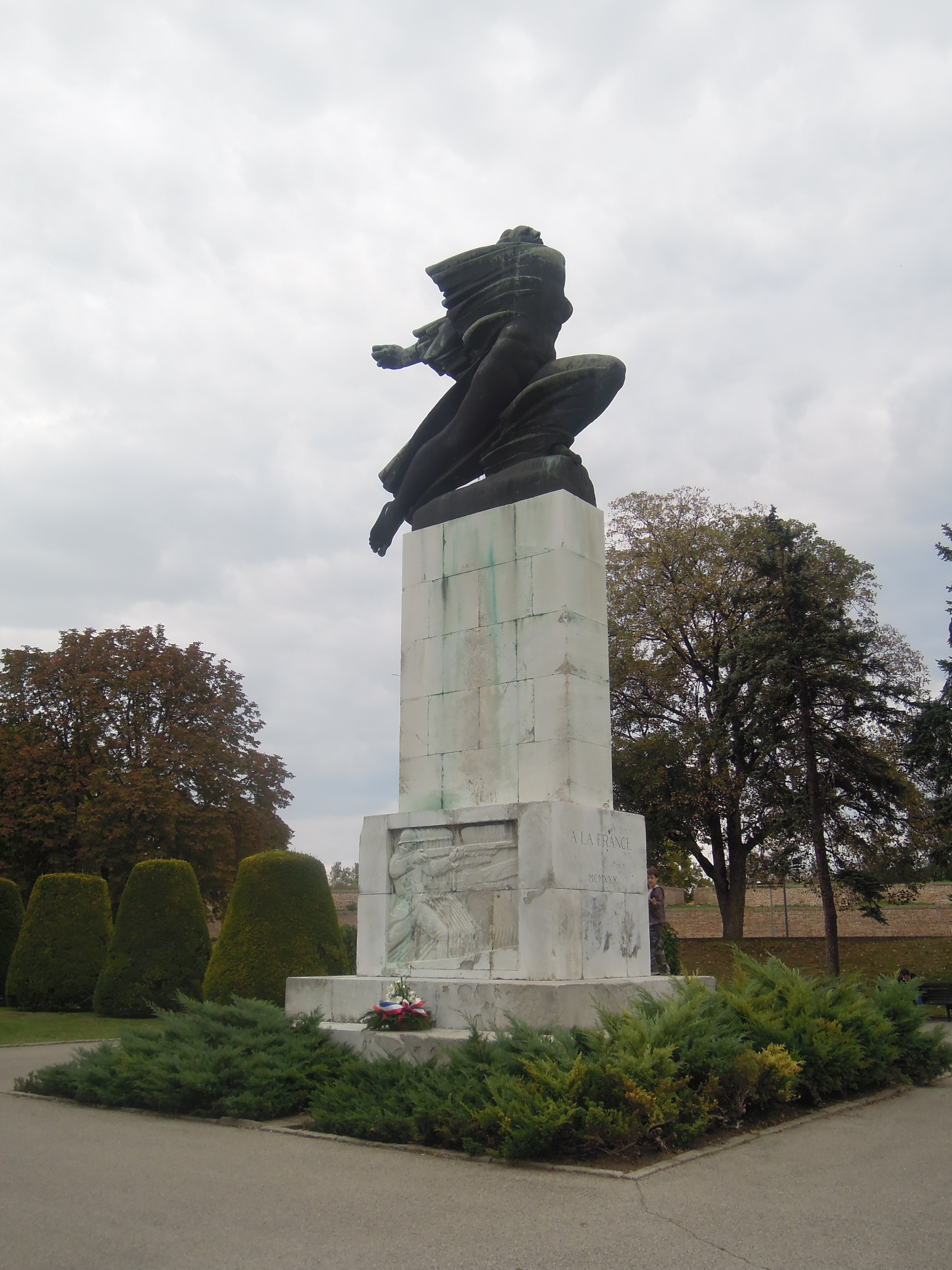
Great Kalemegdan

The design of the monument was entrusted to the world renowned Croatian sculptor Ivan Meštrović, who made a model in his Zagreb studio (MeštrovićGallery). The sculpture was cast in fourteen pieces at the Art Foundry of the Academy of Fine Arts using the lost wax technique. The pieces were joined to form two halves of the vertically divided sculpture, transported to Belgrade and assembled together on the site. The monumental figure, over 4 m (13 ft) high, represents France rushing to Serbia's aid. The expressive movement of the allegorical female figure, an important motif in Meštrović's sculptural work, evokes and glorifies the national spirit of France, suggesting energy, leadership, courage and faith. Monumentality, typical of Meštrović's sculptural expression, is emphasized by mounting the massive form of the central female figure on a seven-metre-high pedestal made of blocks of Brač “marble” (in fact, grey Adriatic limestone turning white with time). The pyramidal structure of its geometric mass sets the rhythm of gradual increase in emphasis towards the central scene and ensures stylistic unity between the monument and the surrounding ground laid out in the geometric pattern of the French garden. By virtue of being located at the far end of the main alley that extends beyond the park borders and into the city's main street (Knez Mihailova), the monument becomes a significant visual landmark.

Engraved on its front are the year of erection and the dedication “A la France”, and on the back, the inscription “We love France as she loved us 1914–1918”. The sides of the base of the pedestal feature narrative compositions in low relief at the eye level of the viewer. The reliefs were executed after Meštrović's drawings by the sculptors Frano Kršinić, who oversaw the work, and Antun Augustinčić, as well as Grga Antunac, Šime Dujmić and Orlandini. Without encroaching into the surrounding space, the reliefs form an organic part of the pedestal, with the carved sections fitted with precision, while leaving the joints visible in the spirit of Egyptian monumentalized relief. The repetitive row of figures in the scene known as Warriors on the left side follows the principle of isocephaly on the model of the bas-relief depicting Assyrian archers, a motif Meštrović elaborated in relief and lithography. It evokes the bond forged by Serbian and French soldiers on the Salonika front. On the opposite side, the more softly modelled allegory of the Sorbonne alludes to the French educational aid extended to Serbian youths during and after the war. The original sketch for this relief, depicting France as a woman breastfeeding Serbian children (now kept at Meštrović Gallery), was altered at the suggestion of the director of the French Institute in Zagreb (Raymond Warnier).

After the revolution and the overthrow of the monarchy, the female figure of Marianne, national symbol of the triumph of French republicanism, found expression in many works of art: she is shown as a leader singing the Marseillaise in Francois Rude's Departure of Volunteers on the Triumphal Arch in Paris; in Eugène Delacroix's famous painting Liberty Leading the People; or as the great mother feeding her children in Daumier's study Republic from the Musée d’Orsay. These and similar allegorical depictions of France as a determined female figure with the characteristic Phrygian bonnet are clear historical references of relevance for Meštrović's conception of the monument in Kalemegdan.

The manner of formal stylization and the force of movement bring the figure close to the Sezession style. The logic of its vigorous forward motion, which can be traced back to late Hellenistic sculpture, is based on placing the entire weight of the figure on the left foot and establishing static equilibrium between dominant planes: between twisted masses of the upper body with the jutting right shoulder and the long taut arc of the right leg, and the cumulative mass of the drapery and left arm. The arrangement of the main planes and the lateral location of reliefs shift the beholder's viewpoint to the sides of the monument. Even though the side aspect is visually richer, Meštrović established the (ideal) frontal viewpoint in order to emphasize the dignity and importance of the central figure. A shift away from naturalism and elements of modern inspiration are most readily observable in the treatment of drapery, which assumes a fantastic shape which, viewed from the rear, makes the figure almost unrecognizable. The fusion of the left arm with the drapery serves to produce an almost aerodynamic form, with the horizontal lineation of the drapery folds suggesting the force of movement which almost lifts the figure into the air. The use of the drapery folds suggests the author's idea to evocation of wings, thereby coming closer to the ideal of victory, the famous late Hellenistic winged Nike of Samothrace.

The central bronze figure is 4.35 m (14.3 ft) tall, 4 m (13 ft) wide and weights 4 tons. It is situated on the 7-metre-high (23 ft) pedestal. The pedestal itself is made of the full blocks of the Brač rocks layered over the concrete core.

== Importance ==
The Monument of Gratitude to France belongs to the post-World War I phase of Meštrović's oeuvre which produced the largest number of his monumental works marked by a lessening concern with detail and the emphasis on the underlying idea. The monument introduced expressiveness instead of the hitherto usual realistic and narrative concept, contributing to the evolution of public monuments in Belgrade.

Based on its cultural and historical value, it was designated a cultural monument in 1965, and a cultural monument of great significance in 1983 (“Sl. glasnik RS”, no. 28/83).

== Controversies ==
=== 1999 ===
In March 1999, France joined the NATO attack on Serbia. As a consequence, a group of young citizens covered the monument with black cloth and placed a writing "May there be eternal glory to the France that doesn't exist anymore". By 2010, some of the historians concluded that the 1930 legacy has passed and that the only thing that remained to memorialize the great friendship between France and Serbia are the monuments.

=== 2018 ===
During the World War I centenary celebration in November 2018 in Paris, the sitting schedule cause a major controversy in Serbia. As Serbian army had a pivotal role in forcing out of the war both Bulgaria and Austro-Hungary, the most extensive casualties compared to the population number and historical friendship with France, placing of Serbian president Aleksandar Vučić away from the central seats and placing there representatives of the states which were on the opposing side in the war or didn't even exist as separate states at the time, was taken as an insult in Serbia.

A day later, the recently renovated monument was vandalized, with the black X marks sprayed over the writings on the monument. The lower section was wrapped in plastic sheets, but the graffiti were cleaned soon and the plastic was removed. Members of the city communal police patrolled the area for a few days. French ambassador to Serbia, Frédéric Mondoloni, publicly apologized on TV for the sitting schedule, but even the suggestions of renaming the streets named after France and Paris appeared in public.

== Literature ==
- CHPIB Documentation
- Svetislav Marodić, “Spomenik zahvalnosti Francuskoj”, B.O.N. no. 21, 21–22 Nov. 1930
- “Pred svečanost otkrivanja Spomenika zahvalnosti Francuskoj”, Politika, 9. Nov. 1930
- “Osvećenje crkve Ružice”, Politika, 12 Oct. 1925
- Mila Jeftović, “Spomenik Karadjordju Paška Vučetića”, Nasledje 3 (2001)
