= Pobednik =

Monumental sculpture in Belgrade, Serbia

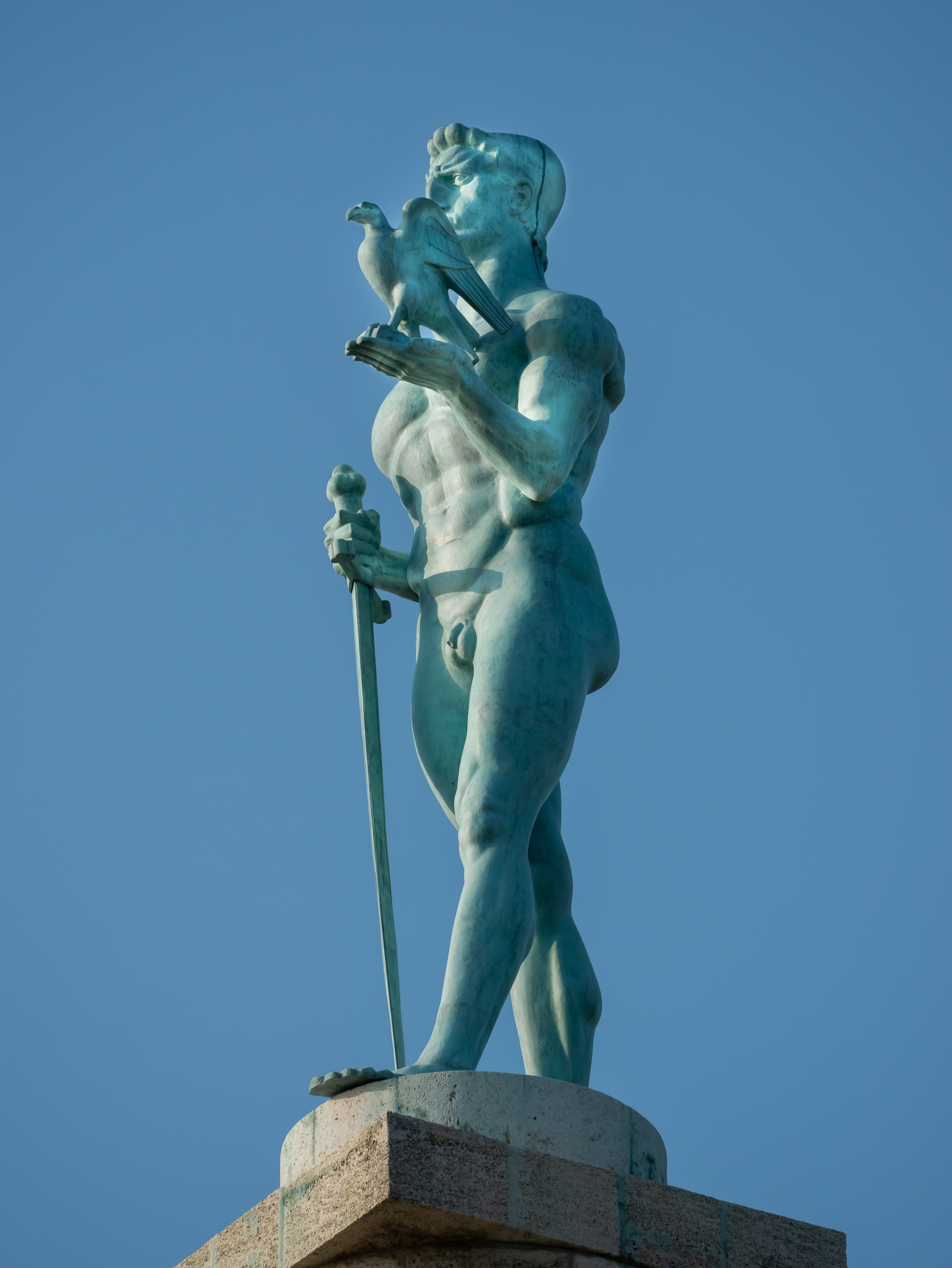
- Interactive map of Pobednik
- 44°49′22.9″N 20°26′51.7″E
- Location: Belgrade Fortress, Belgrade

History
- Dedicated: 7 October 1928

Site notes
- Height: 14 metres (46 ft)
- Sculptor: Ivan Meštrović

Pobednik (Serbian Cyrillic: Победник, lit. 'The Victor') is a monument in the Upper Town of the Belgrade Fortress, built to commemorate Serbia's victory over the Ottoman and Austro-Hungarian empires during the Balkan Wars and the First World War. Cast in 1913, erected in 1928, and standing at 14 metres (46 ft) high, it is one of the most famous works of Ivan Meštrović. It is also one of the most visited tourist attractions in Belgrade and one of its most recognizable landmarks.

It is a standing bronze male figure in the nude with a falcon in the left hand and a sword in the right (as symbols of peace and war), modelled by the sculptor Ivan Meštrović, set on a pedestal in the form of a Doric column on a tall cubic base, designed by the architect Petar Bajalović. The statue looks forward across the confluence of the Sava and the Danube, and over the vast Pannonian plain, towards the very distant Fruška Gora mountain (until 1918 a domain of Austro-Hungarian empire), it is probably the most popular visual symbol of Belgrade.

The statue was removed from the column in October 2019 for repairs. It was returned on the pedestal after the restoration on 14 February 2020.

== History ==
=== Origin ===
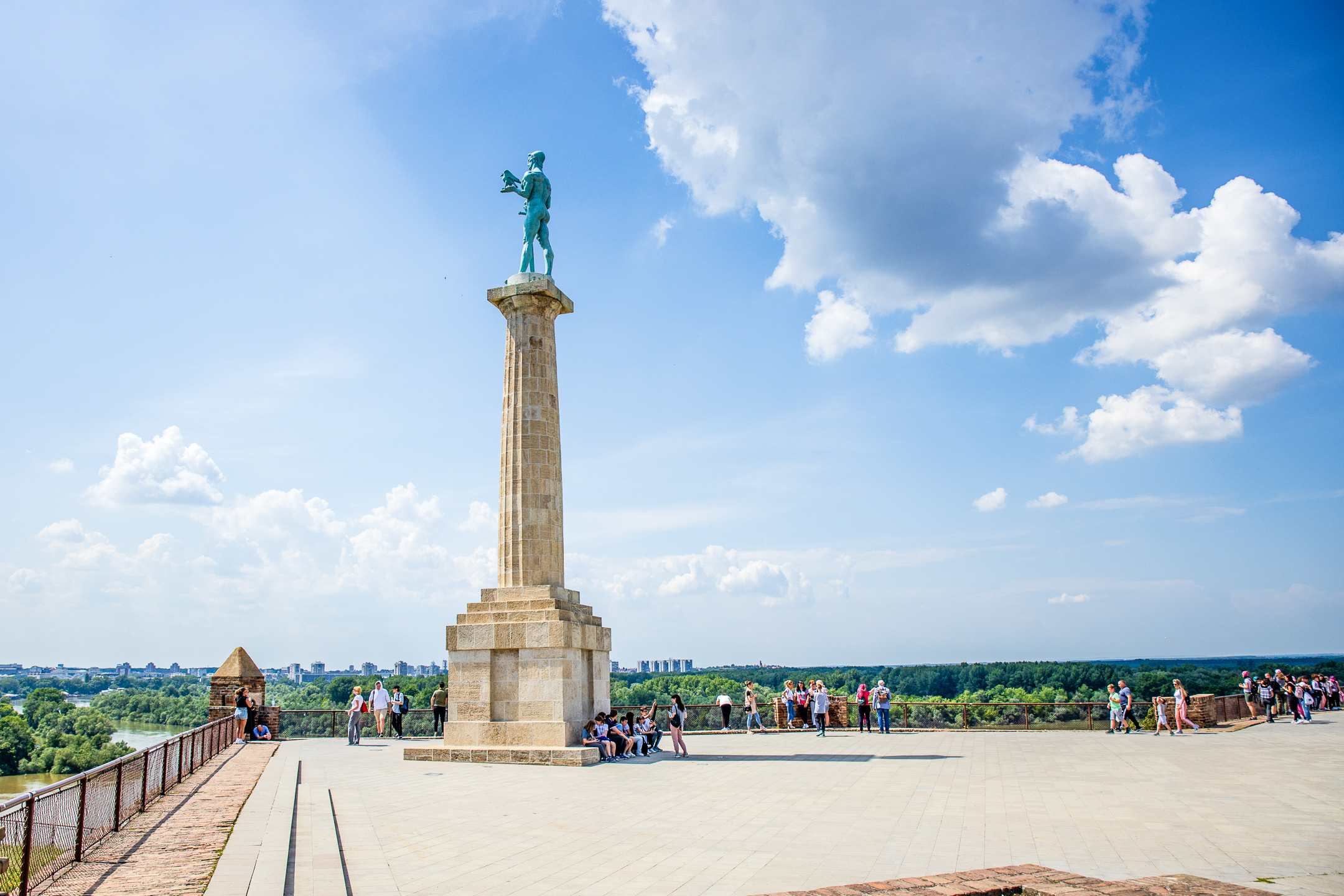
Pobednik, seen from south

The history of the monument goes back to the period between 1913 and 1928, even though the initial idea was born in 1912, when Serbia's success in the First Balkan War inspired proposals for erecting a monument in Belgrade to honour the final victory over the Ottomans. In August 1913 Belgrade city council made the decision to mark this momentous event by erecting a monument to Victory. Headed by the mayor Ljubomir Davidović, the council decided to rename the Terazije square and build the fountain with the monument in it. They also awarded the construction of the monument to Meštrović, without architectural competition.

Meštrović accepted the job and quickly presented his design. The original concept was that of a monumental fountain which was to be placed in Terazije or what then was the Square of Crown Prince Alexander. The fountain was to be built of stone in the form of an oval basin, with 8 m (26 ft) in diameter, resting on the backs of four lions. At the centre of the basin was to be a marble column surmounted by the 5 m (16 ft)-tall statue of the Victor. According to the city council resolutions of 4 October 1913 Meštrović was also to produce twenty masks for the rim of the basin and fifty masks for the column, all in bronze. The column was to have 5 segments, representing 5 centuries of Ottoman occupation. On 19 October 1913 the city contracted with Meštrović and he set to work on the fountain but, being an Austro-Hungarian subject, he had to leave Belgrade at the outbreak of the World War I.

=== Construction ===
Background information about the fountain and its more detailed description were brought out by the newspaper Vreme: ...a large basin (shell) the outer side of which would be decorated with a relief depicting warriors on galloping horses. Affixed along the rim of the shell would be lion’s heads (from the present-day jet fountain) spouting water into the shell. [...] The column would be girdled with spaced hoops to which Turkish head masks would be affixed, and each would spout a jet of water into the basin below...

In order to finish the work as quickly possible, Meštrović moved his studio to Belgrade. He worked in the semi-basement of the Elementary School King Petar I by the Cathedral Church, actually in the school's gym. Due to the size of the statue, the school's roof was partially removed. Within a short time he completed the figure of the Victor and lion's heads. Having sent them to Bohemia for casting, he began to work on the large reliefs of lancers. Sketches for the large lion figures were also done.

Meštrović's statue of the Victor was done in 1913, immediately after and as a continuation, in concept and style, of the cycle of sculptures intended for his large-scale project for a shrine commemorating the Battle of Kosovo (Vidovdanski hram), which includes representative sculptures such as Srdja Zlopogledja, Miloš Obilić and Marko Kraljević. Conceived as a colossal athletic male nude set up on a tall column, the monument symbolically represents the iconic figure of victory. In iconographic terms, the personification of the triumph of a victorious nation can be traced back to classical antiquity and its mythic hero Hercules.

Then the First World War broke out. The Austrian ultimatum forced Meštrović to leave Belgrade and almost all finishing works had to be ceased. During the occupation by Austrian, German and Hungarian troops, all was destroyed except for the statue of the Victor and lion masks, which were away in Bohemia for casting. The exact appearance of the fountain is known from the photographs of Meštrović's original drawings taken in his Zagreb studio by the sculptor Veselko Zorić.

The project of erecting the fountain in Terazije was revived after the First World War, but the available funds could only cover the casting costs for the Victor and lion masks. The statue arrived in Belgrade in the late July 1923 and was stored in a storehouse for plumbing pipes in Senjak. Yet, in 1923 the city council and Meštrović reached an agreement that he should do the monument in Terazije, but the sculpture remained in the storehouse for the next 4 years.

=== Scandal ===
However, the beginning of preparation works for the monument's foundation in May 1927 caused a public controversy. The public challenged the erection of the monument on moral and artistic grounds. Instigated by the author and jurist Petar Odavić, the campaign against the monument began. Odavić published an article in the Vreme magazine, attacking the sculpture claiming it insults the moral of chaste Belgrade ladies, so as the memory on Serbian soldiers which it was to represent, by not having "symbols of the Serbian soldiers", like the šajkača hat or the opanak footwear, and that it doesn't represent a Serbian hero but rather some ancient one. Still, the design was endorsed by numerous members of Serbian academia, like Bogdan Popović, Stevan Hristić, Branislav Petronijević, Ksenija Atanasijević, Zora Petrović, Beta Vukanović or Stanislav Krakov, but also by certain women organizations and parts of the clergy. Division among public, elite and church soon gained political connotation. There were various, jokingly suggestions, like the proposition for the super-high pedestal so that its nudity won't be visible from the ground or that, since it is already nude, it may be placed in a swimming pool.

Meštrović also had his say: Belgrade City Council asked my consent to set up the “Victor” in Terazije temporarily. But aware that our “temporarily” tends to last too long, I have made an agreement with the Belgrade architect Bajalović for a more solid pedestal for the statue. The Council, so I’ve heard, set to work. And then stopped. What have I to say? If they intend to set up the statue in Terazije, let them set it up. If they have found a better place, let them set it up there. After all, it may as well stay where it has been for all this time – in a shed. As far as I am concerned, I’d like it best to have the opportunity to do the whole Fountain the way it was originally conceived.

Especially vocal against it were the members of several female organizations. They considered the placing of a figure of a nude man in the center of the city is "rude" and that it will damage the moral of the girls. After much controversy, debate and criticism, the city council decided not to set up the monument in Terazije, but to find a location outside the city. As soon as Kosta Kumanudi took over as a mayor of Belgrade in 1926, he pushed to project to finally get it done. Belgrade municipality officially purchased the monument. Also, by this time the city decided to scrap the fountain and the lion heads at the monument's base due to the money reasons. The Arts Commission, formed by the city, decided in September 1927 to relocate the monument and place it "on the ridge of the Belgrade Town, at the mouth of the Sava and the Danube". As Kumanudi had other duties in the state government, this decision was confirmed by his deputy Kosta Jovanović, and Kumanudi was neither aware or notified about it at the time. Kumanudi then informed Meštrović that the preparatory work on erecting the monument had been ceased contrary to his instructions. This decision of the city council coincided with the completion of the Sava Avenue and the Great Stairway in Kalemegdan Park as well as with the celebration of the anniversary of the Salonika front breakthrough. It was in commemoration of that event's 10th anniversary that on 7 October 1928 the freshly refurbished part of the Sava Avenue was inaugurated and the Victor unveiled.

=== Recent history ===
Measurements from 1989 showed that the "Victor" is partially standing on the embankment and partially on the medieval rampart, which is why it is tilting. The technical documentation for the pedestal is lost so the Institute for the protection of the cultural monuments has done its own research. It showed that the core of the pedestal is made of concrete while from the outside it has been slab-sided with the stone. The monument was partially repaired in the 1989–1991 period. Within this project, in 1990 it was cleaned from the graffiti and dirt.

In 1996, the Institute tried to improve the static of the monument and to stop further tilting, but eventually unsuccessfully. The foundations were strengthened and the piles were placed to prevent the tilting. Still, the monument hasn't been fully straightened and remained in partially tilted position, as the piles were pushed into the soft section of the rampart and the subsidence of the terrain continued. Researches in 2007–2009 showed that it was tilted 0.8 mm (0.031 in).

In 2015, when the broken plates were being removed and replaced at the foothill of the statue, it was discovered that the earth beneath is sagging. The measurements were conducted and an underground room, dug in the 1950s, was discovered beneath the plateau. That delayed the works on the plateau itself, which were finished in September 2016: the new marble plates were placed, so as the decorative lights, while the problem of draining the atmospheric waters was solved, but the monument itself (both the pedestal and the sculpture) were not renovated. That same year the Belgrade University Civil Engineering Faculty concluded that the "tilting is a process which continues and shows no signs of slowing down or stopping".

In September 2017, it was reported that there is a crack on the monument. The crack starts from beneath the Victor's left foot, goes over the capital and down the Doric column. It is some 50 cm (20 in) long and quite visible. The cracks on the plinth, or the bronze base of the sculpture were the deepest, 4 to 8 mm (0.16 to 0.31 in) wide. The damage of the base, both to the sculpture and the pedestal, is such, that the sculpture stands on the inner, corroded iron skeleton and not on its bronze body. The reporters remarked that it looks like the "Victor stomped with his left foot, creating the crack". The Institute stated that the crack is there for a long time and that it is not affecting the stability or the static of the monument, despite the tilt. The crack was growing as the water was entering into it, getting frozen and expanding during the winters, causing further corrosion. The stone on the statue's round bas on top of the pedestal crumbled almost completely, while the steel parts rusted. They announced the full reconstruction and static overhaul for 2019, for which the special technologies are required. The bidding for the project was announced in October 2018. The bronze statue itself, which is damaged by the various ammunitions in time, will be removed from the column, repaired and returned to its place. The column and the pedestal will be repaired in situ and a temporary workshop will be set at the plateau on which the monument is built, where the statue will be repaired, too.

On 9 May 2018 on the occasion of Europe Day, the Victor was illuminated for the first time with the colours of EU – blue and yellow (stars) – thanks to the EU Delegation in Serbia.

=== 2019 – 2020 reconstruction ===
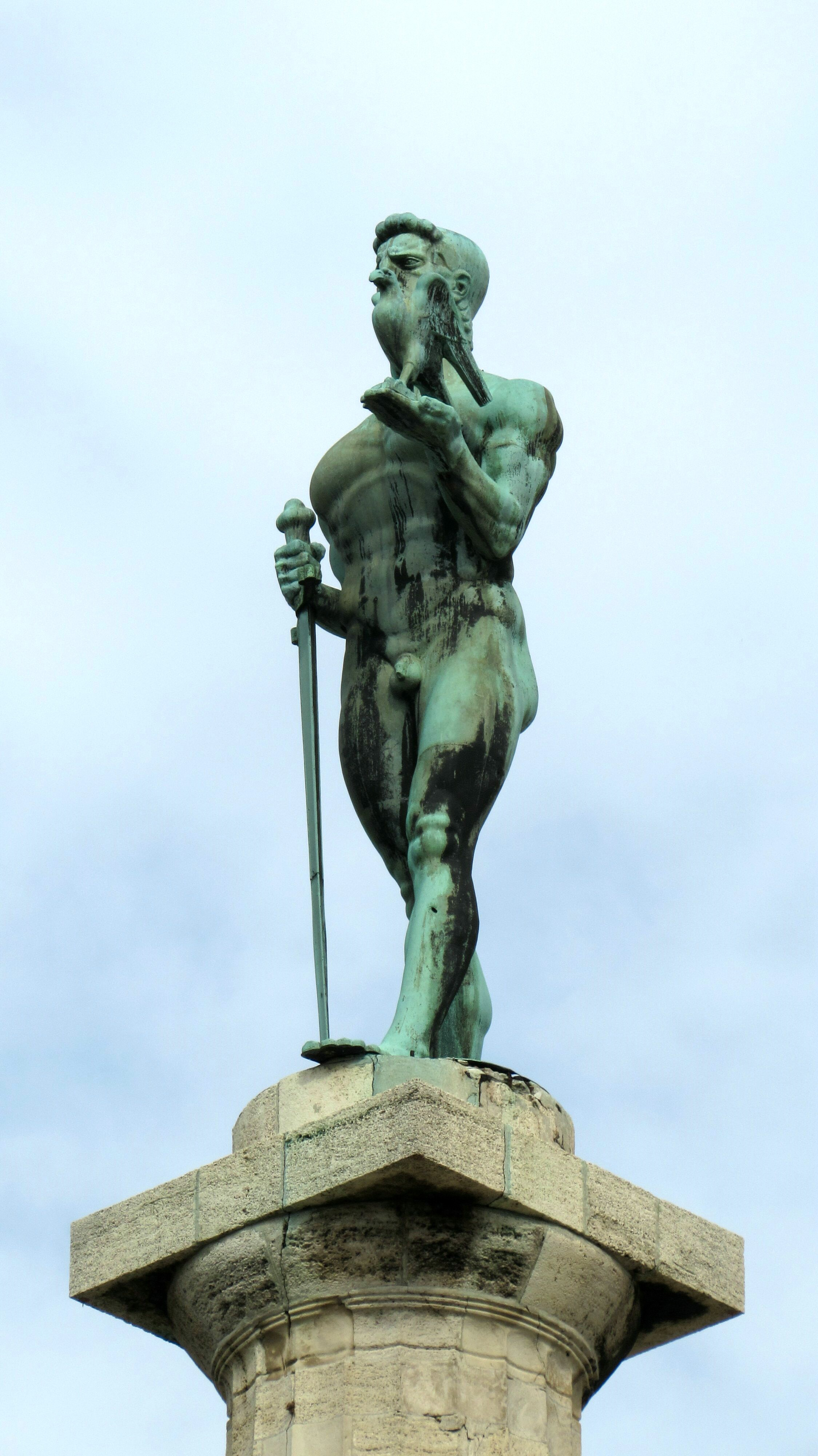
Monument before 2019 restoration

On 28 August 2019 preparatory works on the repair began. The base construction will be fixed first, in order to prevent micro movements and to straighten up the monument. The slabs and plates will be removed so that new piles and beams could be placed below. On 10 October 2019 the statue itself was removed and transported to Smederevo, where sculptor Zoran Kuzmanović will repair it. For the first time since it was posted in 1928, the statue was physically removed from its pedestal. When it was lowered to the ground, it was shown that the statue remained attached to the pedestal only by one screw and the lightning rod wire, while the cables which connected the statue to the base from the inside completely, all four of them, rotted and disappeared. It was also established that the sculpture was lighter than previously thought: it was estimated to be 1.5 to 1.7 tons, but it turned out it has only 1 ton. The sculpture was exhibited for a while at Tsarigrad Road, path in the Kalemegdan Park and former starting point of the road which connected Belgrade to Constantinople.

Kuzmanović also headed the repairs of another Fortress landmark, the Monument of Gratitude to France, in 2018. The sculpture has never been repaired since the unveiling. In time it turned black, with only patches of preserved green copper patina. The inner construction of the statue and its connection to the pedestal will also be replaced as, at the time, they were made of iron which corroded in time. The top of the pedestal, on which the sculpture stands, will be completely replaced. Deadline is set for February 2020.

The stone slabs used originally were from Tašmajdan quarry, which has been closed a long time ago. Also, the rock below the monument, which was partially used during the construction, can't be used as it protected as the natural monument today, as it originates from the period when the area of Belgrade was submerged under the Pannonian Sea. Instead, stone from Fruška Gora will be used.

After transportation to Smederevo, it turned out that the statue is even in the worse condition than previously estimated, including terrible statics and loosened sword and eagle. A construction made of stainless steel was added inside the sculpture, to properly connect it to the pedestal. Also, it was discovered that part of the tombstone was embedded into the base. Tombstone probably originated from the Old Cemetery, the 19th cemetery in Tašmajdan. The cemetery was relocated by 1927 to the Belgrade New Cemetery and the remaining tombstones were reused for various construction works around the city. The stone will be preserved and exhibited. Though this was the usual practice in the Balkans in general (the old, reused materials are called spolia), art historians are surprised that a tombstone was used as the pedestal.

Due to the high concentration of sulfur dioxide in Belgrade atmosphere, the patina is mostly made of copper sulfate. However, it developed unevenly, so some parts of the sculpture are light green while some are black. It will be cleaned as much as possible (including dry ice) as patina is eating out the copper core. To slow down the process, the Pobednik will be treated with special chemicals. The oxides were removed using the technique of the dry ice abrasive blasting at the temperature of −75 °C (−103 °F). It was discovered that the nose was partially covered with bronze tin patch, presumably because of the faulty mold. The patch separated in time which allowed for the water to enter inside the sculpture which explains why everything rusted and decayed inside. Kuzmanović cast a proper bronze section of the nose and closed it. It was also found that the steel connection between the handle and the blade of the sword completely corroded. The screw which also supported it was completely rotten and disappeared. It was a pure luck that the blade didn't fall down from the pedestal. Over 30 bullet and shrapnel holes were found on the statue. One cannonball was discovered in one of its legs.

To prevent further tilting of the column and to make static of the foundation firmer, eight rebar bars were drilled into the ground. Each has a diameter of 40 mm (1.6 in) and an average length of 10 m (33 ft). Their purpose is not to straighten the column, only to make it more stable, so it will remain tilted. The column was cleaned from soot and the cracks in it, some up to 15 cm (5.9 in) deep, were filled. The sculpture had a total of almost 100 dents and in the end weighted a half of ton more than before the restoration.

The statue was returned on the column on 14 February 2020. Works on the column itself and on the surrounding plateau continued until the complete reconstruction was finished on 5 March 2020.

== Assessment ==
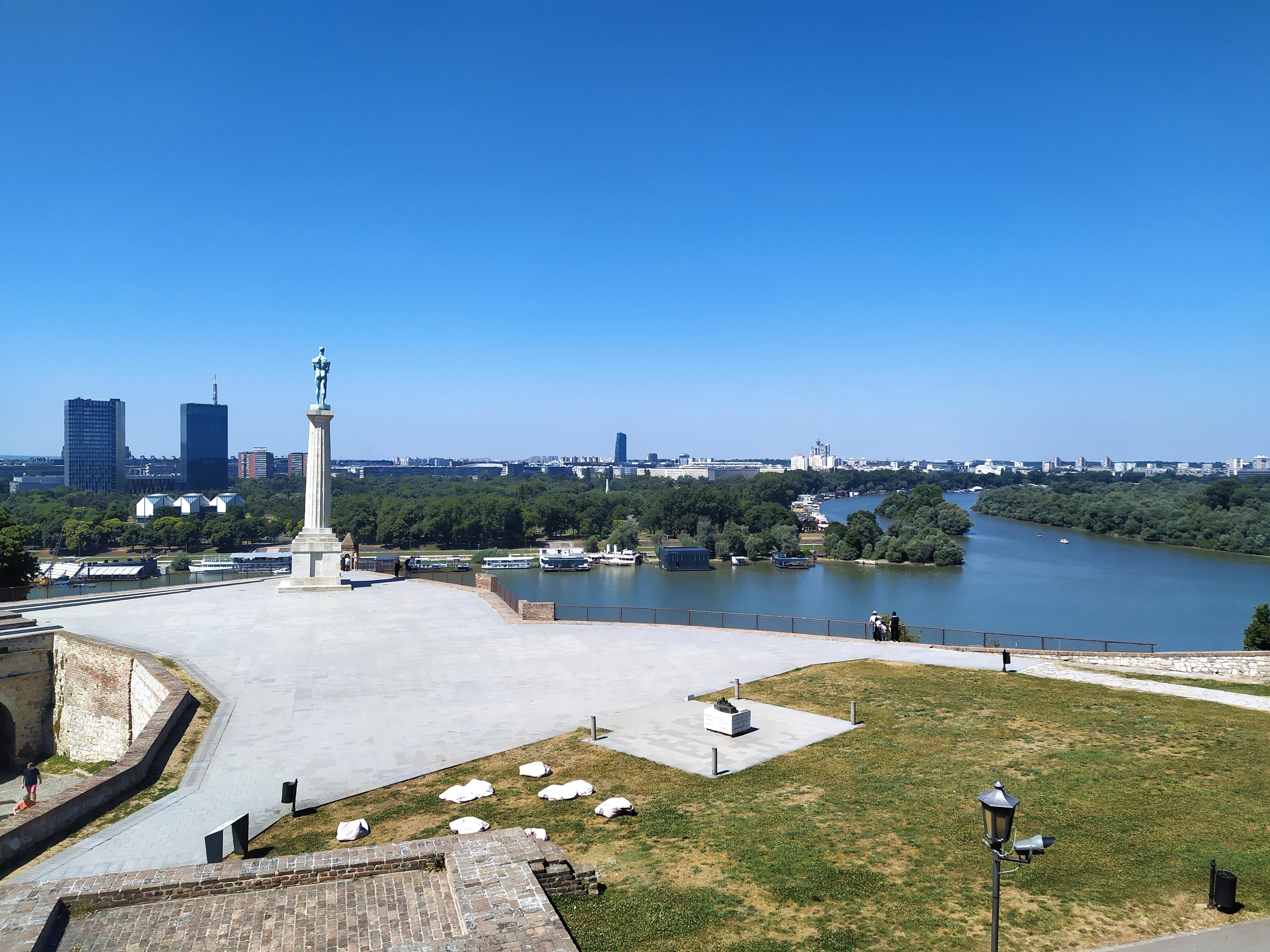
Aerial view of the monument on Belgrade Fortress facing Ušće

Though monument's position and design may be interpreted in a way that he is "guarding" the city, and its present function as a major symbol of Belgrade, art historians tend to believe that, due to the scandals following its construction, the monument is placed on present location, on such a high pedestal and turned away from the city in order "not to be seen better, but to be seen less".

After the creation of a new state and a new spiritual climate in the aftermath of the First World War, the concept of the Herald of Victory (which was the original name of the statue) as the crowning motif of the fountain as a monument to freedom and liberation from the centuries-long Ottoman occupation lost its originally intended sense and its name came to reflect its new dedication to the Salonika front breakthrough and the victory of the Serbian army in the First World War.

The simple design of the pedestal and its well-proportioned height made it possible to take in the monument as a whole rather than in detail, which resulted in the desired monumentality and the perception of the monument as a sign or a symbol. Over time the Victor has become one of the most salient symbols of Belgrade. Along with the Monument of Gratitude to France, it belongs to the few public monuments erected between the two world wars in Belgrade which pursued contemporary stylistic trends. The Victor Monument was designated as a cultural heritage property in 1992.

== Gallery ==
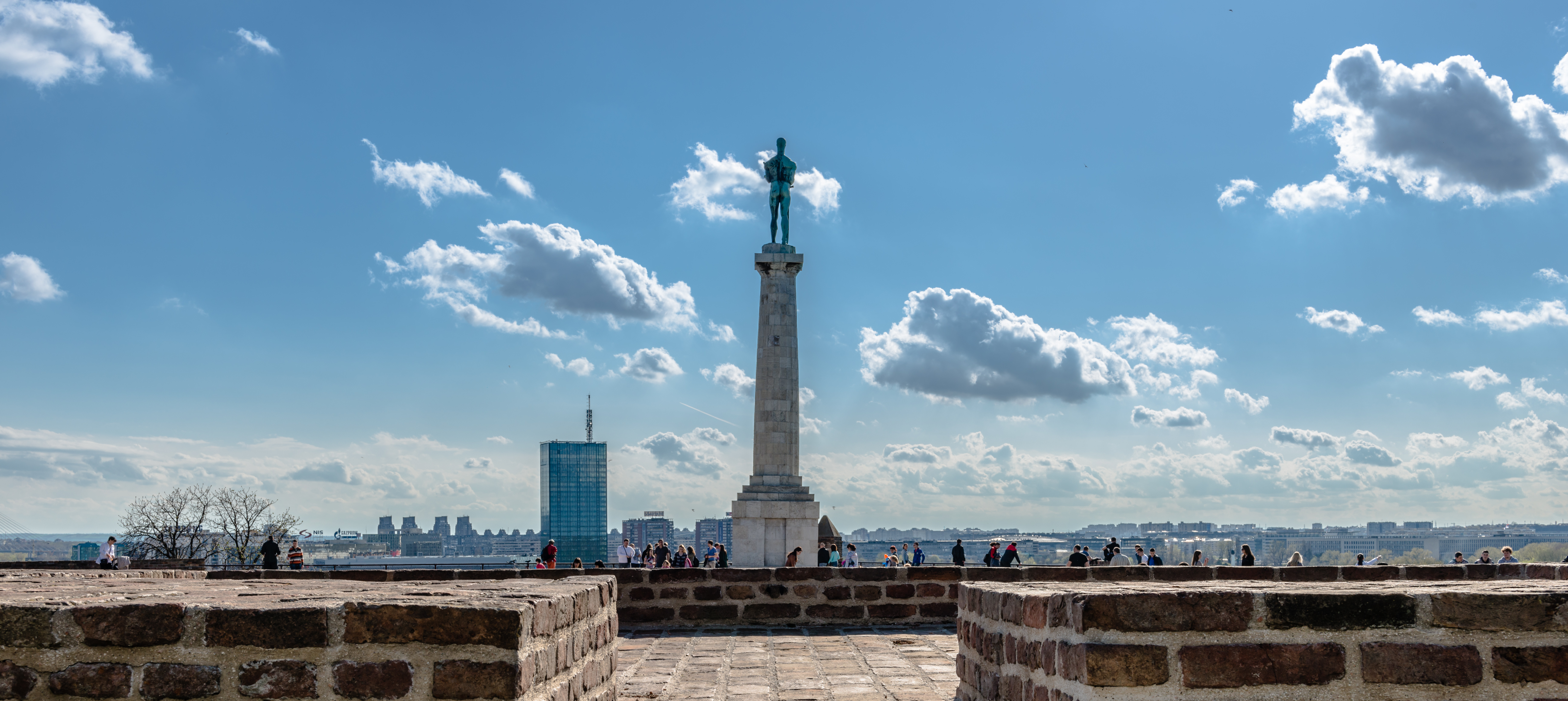
Statue and Ušće

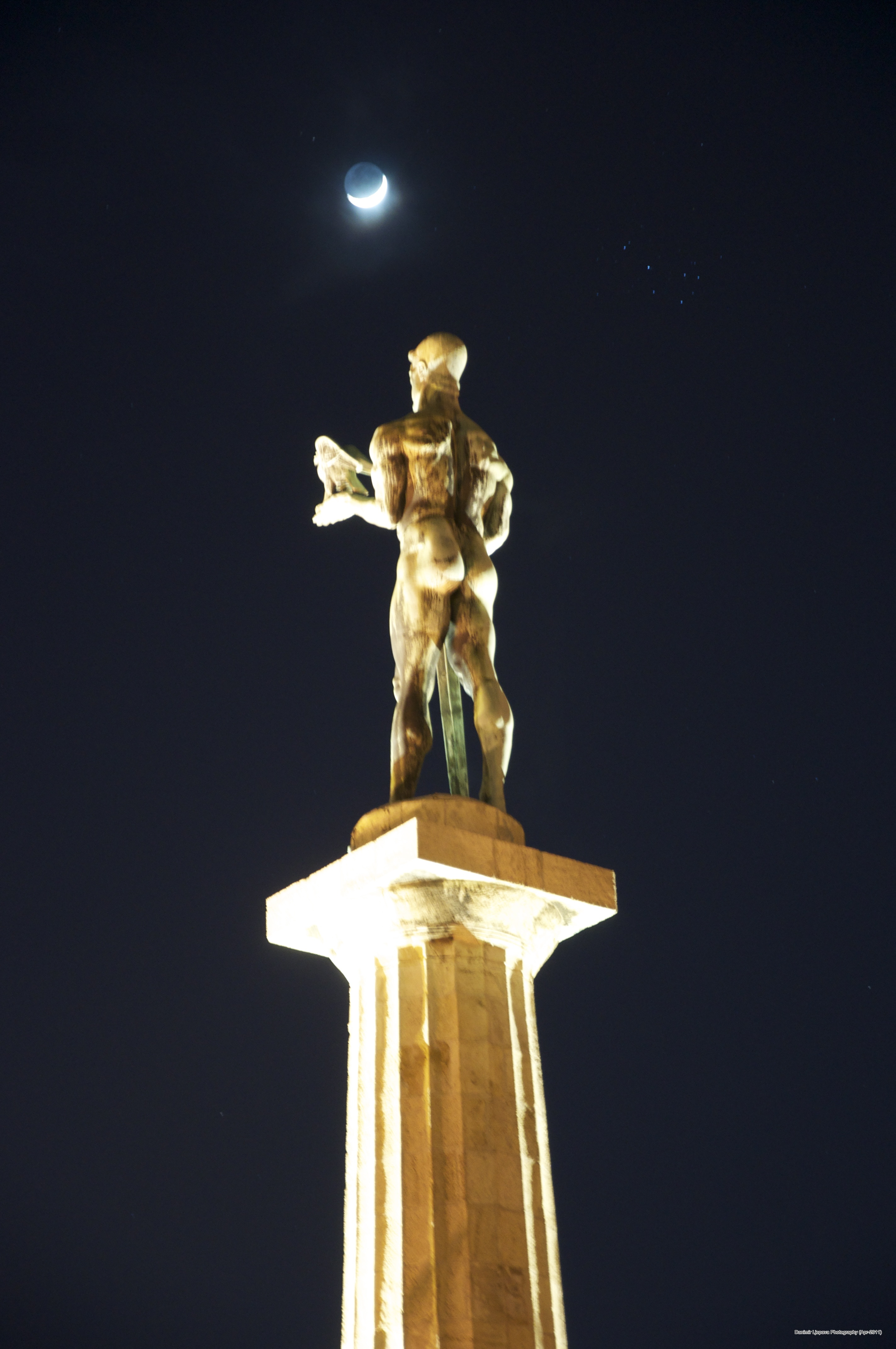
Statue of the Victor at night with the Moon and Ursa Minor in the background.

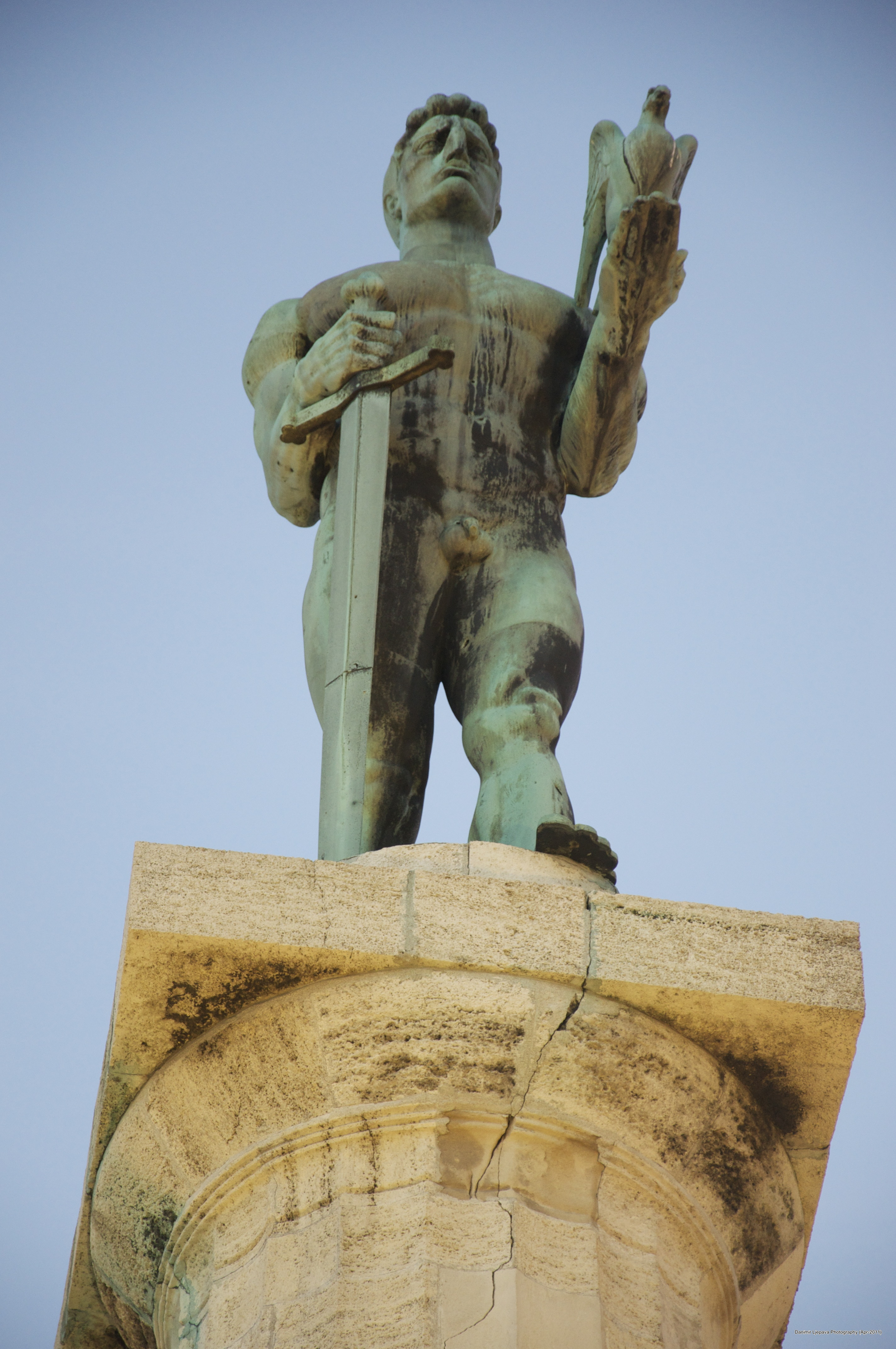
View of statue from close distance.

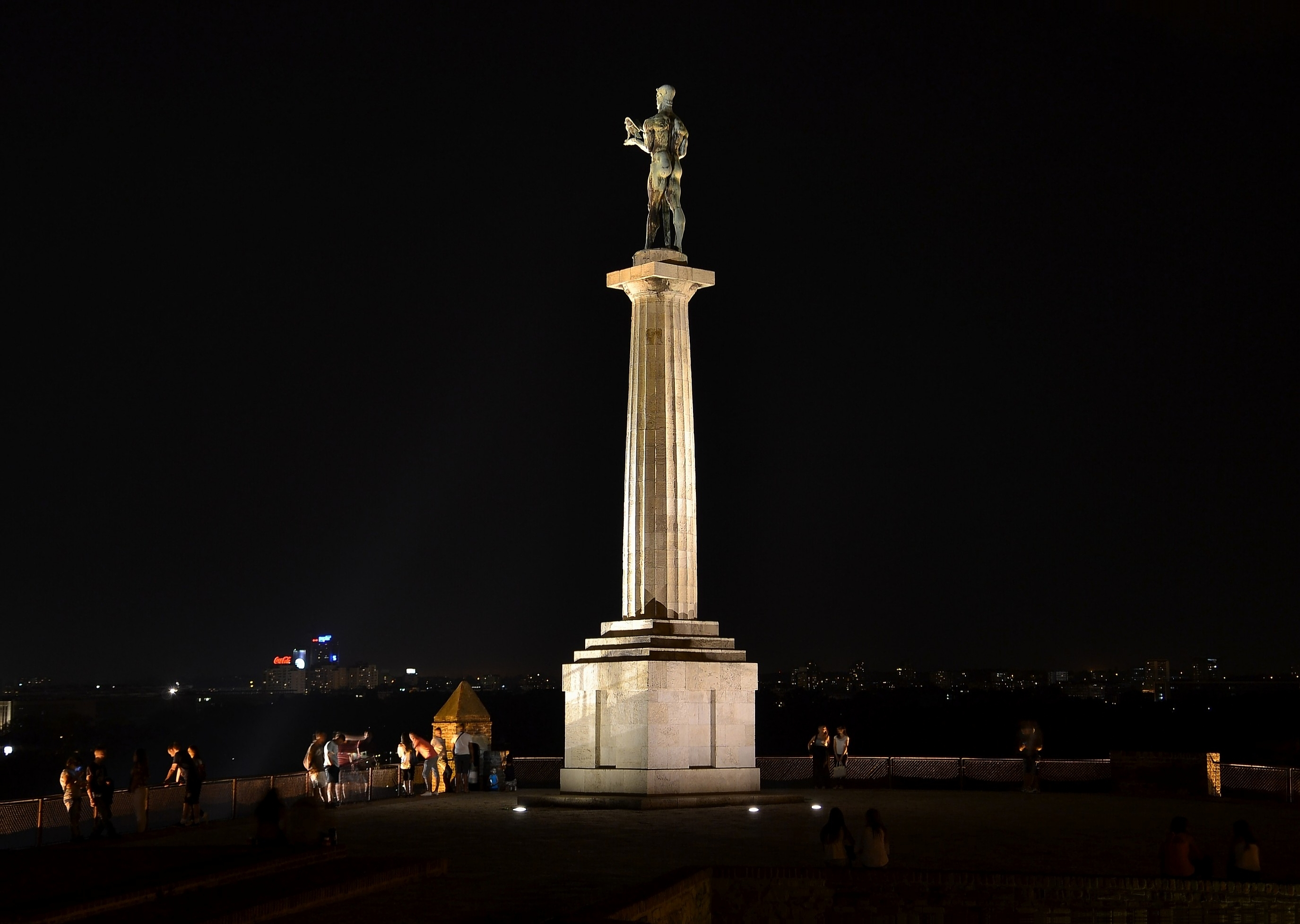
Statue of Victor at night

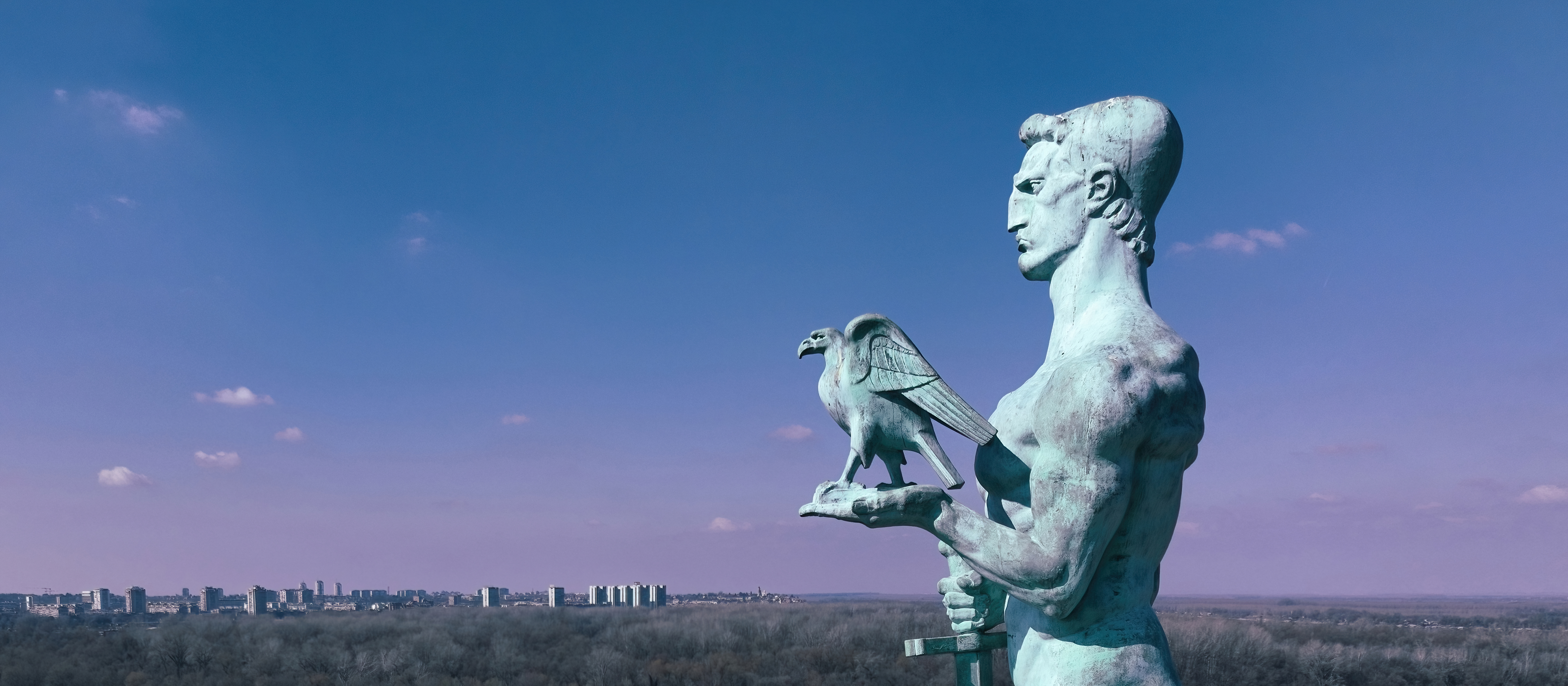
Partial view at eye level

== See also ==
- Tourism in Serbia
- Protected Monuments of Culture (Serbia)

== Sources ==
- Duško Kečkemet, Život Ivana Meštrovića 1883.–1962.–2002 (Zagreb 2009).
- Danijela Vanušić, “Podizanje spomenika Pobedi na Terazijama” Nasledje IX (Belgrade 2008), 193–210.
- Radina Vučetić-Mladenović, “Pobednik: polemike uoči postavljanja Meštrovićevog spomenika”, Godišnjak za društvenu istoriju VI: 2 (1999), 110–123.
- CHPIB Documentation
