= Emilijan Josimović =

Serbian urban planner

Emilijan Josimović (1823 – 25 May 1897) was a Serbian urban planner who designed the first urban plan of Belgrade at the same time as Cerdà in Barcelona and Georges-Eugène Haussmann in Paris from 1853 until 1870. Josimović was arguably the first modern Serbian urbanist and the first modern professor of architecture in Serbia.

== Biography ==
=== The family ===
Emilijan Josimović was born in 1823 in the town of Moldova Nouă, at the time in the Caraș-Severin County, Austrian Empire (now Romania), in the Serbian family of border lieutenant Josimović. He had one older brother and two younger ones. Jovan the older brother was engaged in trade and cooperated with Miša Anastasijević, who helped in Emilijan's schooling, considering that his father died early on. Emilijan married twice. First, Emilija, the daughter of Vasilije Lazić, and he had three children with her: a daughter Anka and two sons, Nikola and Milivoj. After Emilia's death, Emilijan married Živka, with whom he left Belgrade in 1887. The married couple went on to live first in Šopić, near Lazarevac, and later in Sokobanja, where Emilian died on 25 May 1897.

=== Education ===
In 1831, Emilijan enrolled in a grammar school in Caransebeș. He finished the mathematical military school in Lugoj, and completed his academic studies at the University of Vienna, earning a degree in philosophy and technical sciences at the age of 22.

=== Work in education ===
Josimović spent his entire working life dedicated to teaching and designing innovative urban cityscapes. Upon his arrival in Belgrade, on 18 September 1845, he became a part-time professor at the Belgrade Lyceum, where he taught mathematics. He also founded the Technical Society. In the Belgrade Artillery School, where he worked from 1850, first as a part-time professor, and from 1854 to 1869 as a full professor, in addition to mathematics, he also taught mechanics, and then geodesy. He became a full professor at the Velika škola on 19 November 1869. There he was the head of the Mathematics Department and then became its rector. He retired from the Velika škola after 33 years of dedicated educational work. Josimović wrote university textbooks in Serbia in trigonometry, mathematics, mechanics, geometry, descriptive geometry and perspective, as well as a textbook on civil architecture and road construction.

=== Social engagement ===
He was one of the founders of the "Belgrade Singing Society" in 1853. As an engineer, he tried in 1867 to solve the issue of water supply in the city of Belgrade. He published his "Proposal" in the newspaper and imagined that water would be pumped from the Danube with the help of pumps. In 1885, pensioner Josimović was a regular member of the "Serbian Agricultural Society". He also wrote articles for the professional newspaper "Težak" (1889). On 1 August 1848, he became a regular member of the Society of Serbian Letters.

=== Urbanism ===
Josimović actively participated in the public and social life of Belgrade and Serbia, in which there were few intellectuals at that time. He became a member of the Society of Serbian Letters, and then of the Royal Serbian Academy. He also participated in the founding and work of the first Technical School, the forerunner of the current Association of Technicians and Engineers of Serbia. The most significant work of Emilijan Josimović is certainly "Explanation of the proposal for regulating that part of the city of Belgrade that lies in the trench" made from 1864 to 1867, the year when Belgrade officially became a free city when the Turks left.

The bold and far-reaching Josimović plan is referred to as the area of today's narrowest city center. This was at the same time when large construction works were being carried out in other major European cities, such as Haussmann's renovation of Paris and Ildefons Cerdà's "extension" of Barcelona called the Eixample. The first urban plan traced some of the basic axes of today's Belgrade - Knez Mihajlova Street, Tsar Dušan, King Peter I avenues. Until then, the streets of Belgrade were mostly winding. The trench was an external fortification whose line can be recognized in the broken routes of today's Kosančić's, Topličin's and Obilić's wreath (circle). Emphasizing the lack of greenery and free spaces for rest, Josimović proposes public parks on the site of the Great Market (Studentski trg) and on Kalemegdan. The first idea for the construction of a modern water supply system in Belgrade was put forward by Emilijan in 1867. He started from the fact that the central reservoir should be placed in the highest part of the town, in the Upper Town, while the steam engine would bring water from the Danube, and then it would be distributed from the top of the hill to various parts of the city. However, there was no money or support for his ideas.

=== Adoption of the first urban plan of the old town of Belgrade ===
The centenary of the adoption of the first urban plan of the old core of Belgrade was marked in 1967 with a special exhibition and a ceremonial academy. The Institute of Architecture and Urbanism of Serbia had published a special publication "Emilijan Josimović - the first Serbian urbanist", whose author was Dr. Branko Maksimović.

During the renovation of Knez Mihailova Street and its transformation into a pedestrian zone in 1987, a monument with the name of Emilijan Josimović and the year of the adoption of the first urban plan for Belgrade was erected on Republic Square in front of the building where the Ruski car Tavern is located.

A street in Belgrade is named after him.
