= Kalemegdan Park =

Park in Belgrade, Serbia

- Калемегдански парк Kalemegdanski park
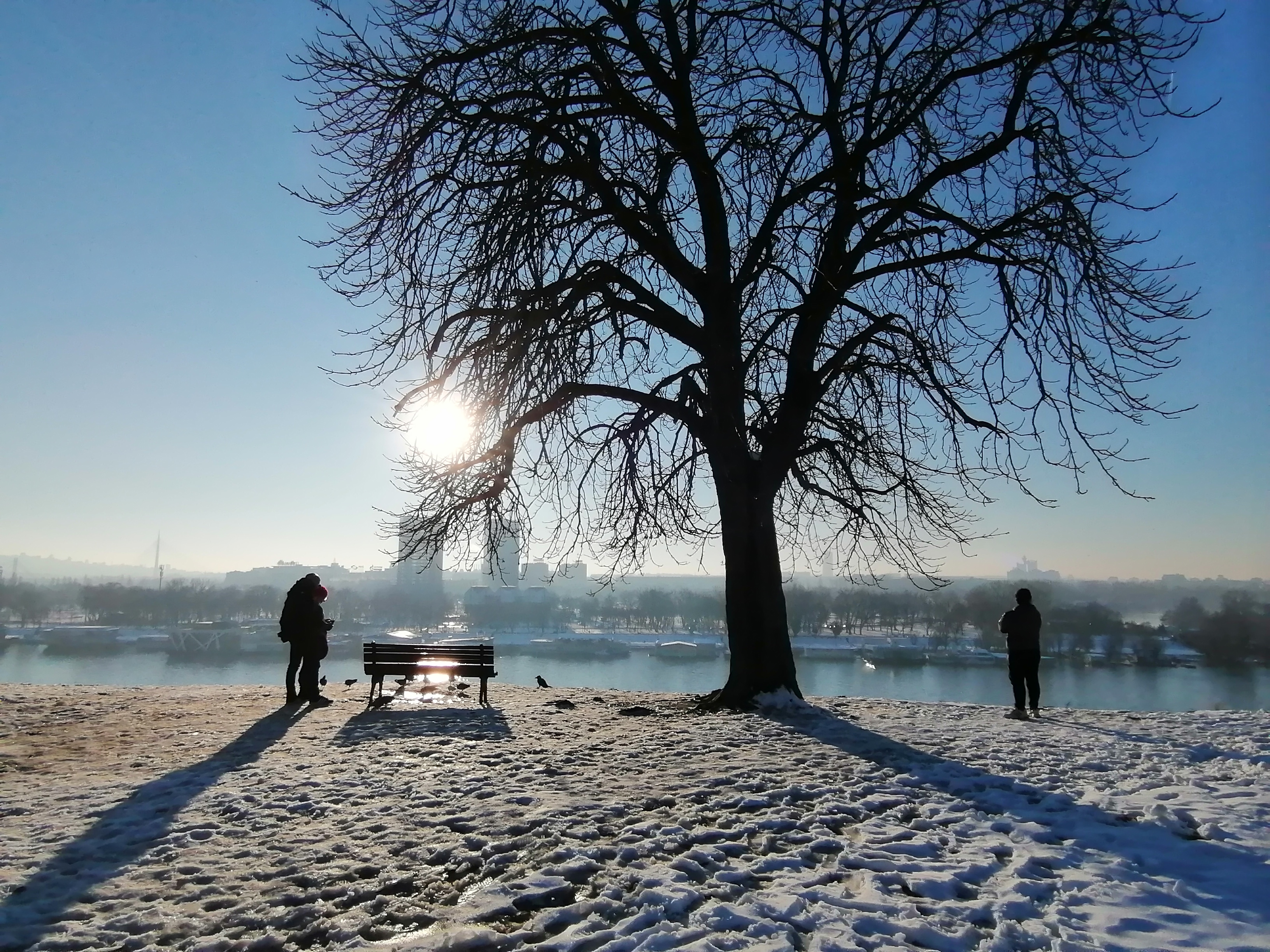
- Kalemegdan Park

- Location within Belgrade
- Location: Stari Grad, Belgrade, Serbia
- Coordinates: 44.822593°N 20.453066°E
- Open: Open all year

The Kalemegdan Park (Serbian: Калемегдански парк / Kalemegdanski park), or simply Kalemegdan (Serbian Cyrillic: Калемегдан) is the largest park and the most important historical monument in Belgrade. It is located on a 125-metre-high (410 ft) cliff, at the junction of the River Sava and the Danube.

Kalemegdan Park, split in two as the Great and Little Parks, was developed in the area that once was the town field within the Belgrade Fortress. Today residents often erroneously refer to the entire fortress as the Kalemegdan Fortress or just Kalemegdan, even though the park occupies the smaller part, especially of the historical fortress, and it is some two millennia younger. The fortress, including the Kalemegdan, represents a cultural monument of exceptional importance (from 1979), the area where various sport, cultural and arts events take place, for all generations of Belgraders and numerous visitors of the city.

== History ==
=== Pre-park history ===
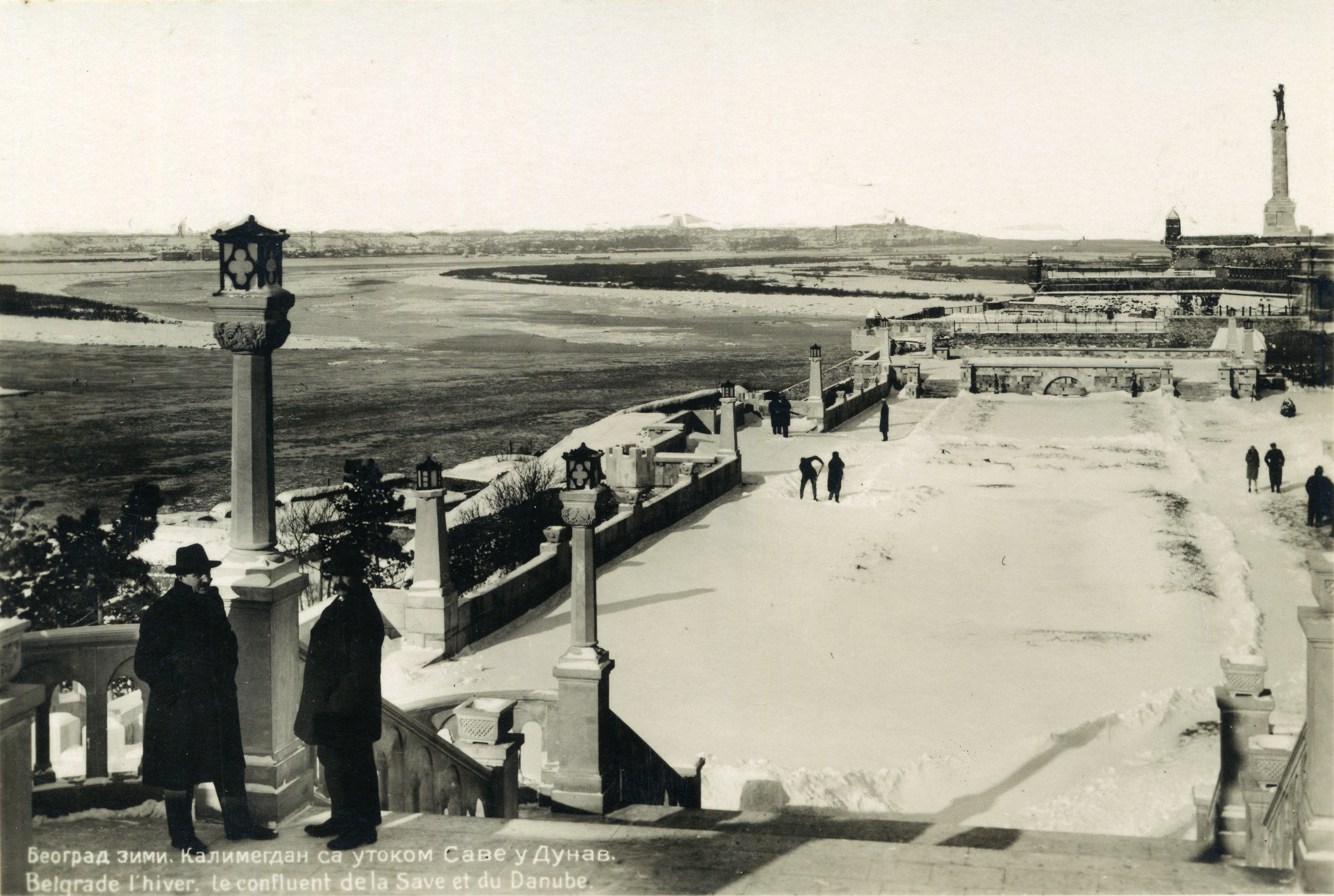
Kalemegdan Park in 1928

The name is formed from the two Turkish words: kale (meaning "fortress") and meydan (meaning "plaza, square", phonetically shifted to "megdan" in Serbian). Originally, it was an empty strip of land, from the Sava to the Danube (hence the name). It was used by the Ottoman army as the training ground, ceremonial military review location and the gathering point of the army before the battles. Several meters wide strip also separated the strictly military section of the fortress from the civilian houses.

As such, the field was neglected for centuries. Bohemian writer Siegfried Kapper visited Belgrade in 1850 and in his 1853 book Südslavische Wanderungen (Roaming through the South Slavic lands) wrote: "I wandered off in the Turkish part of the city...and I reached some large, green meadow. It was Kalemegdan, the open field which separates city from the fortress. The appearance of the field is quite rugged. The terrain is uneven and rocky. No tree or shrub can prosper here. The grass is dry...and bones of dead horses and cattle are scattered over it. But so much better is the view, which widely spreads over both river and their banks".

According to diplomat Kosta Hristić, the Kalemegdan was full of dogs, some feral, and was dangerous to pass through. Still, the several historical events occurred there. Ruling prince Miloš Obrenović accepted the 1859 beratlı, by which the Ottoman sultan confirmed his second accession to the throne. During the Čukur Fountain incident in 1862, as the fighting between Serbs and Ottomans happened in the vicinity, British and Russian consuls in Belgrade relocated to the tents in Kalemegdan, to have better insight in the situation. When the Ottomans fully withdrew from Serbia in 1867, the Turkish pasha handed over the keys to the city to the ruling prince Mihajlo Obrenović.

=== Origin ===
The area was not cultivated immediately after the Turkish withdrawal. The first works on arranging the town field Kalemegdan started in 1869. Though not the oldest park in Belgrade, it is the one which is being continually groomed and attended the longest. The area of the town field was sort of a buffer zone between the fortress and the settlement outside of the Laudon trench, which separated the Turkish and the Serbian sections of Belgrade. The idea of turning the area into the park came from Belgrade's first trained urbanist, Emilijan Josimović, who in 1869 basically constructed modern Knez Mihailova Street. Prior to that, only a short part of what is today Knez Mihailova, called "Delijska street", actually existed as a street. Josimović successfully transformed the existing incomplete trail into the proper street which directly connected downtown Belgrade with the fortress, thus establishing a direct communication between the inner and outer neighborhoods. Josimović then proposed that Kalemegdan, as now Knez Mihailova ended at it, should be transformed into "gorgeous park", as he considered parks in general "air reservoirs". Later, architect Aleksandar Bugarski who was also a landscape architect continued to improve on the work of Josimović.

King Milan ordered the levelling of the terrain in the eastern sections of the fortress and planting of the greenery and trees, which in time developed into the Kalemegdan Park. He was inspired by the parks he saw in France. First phase of the forestation lasted until 1875 and included planting of the trees beneath the fortress' ramparts and in the Upper Town. The arranging of the main Sava alley, above the river, began in 1886. Most extensive works in the park were done from 1890. During March 1891, the pathways were cut through, and trees were planted; in 1903 the Small Staircase was built, based on the project of Jelisaveta Načić, the first woman architect in Serbia, while the Big Staircase, designed by architect Aleksandar Krstić, was built in 1928.

Area at the top of the Little Kalemegdan, which is occupied by the Cvijeta Zuzorić Art Pavilion today, was an open fairground for a long time. The very first recorded circus in Belgrade settled here in 1845. Sources from the period claim this was the first time the Belgraders saw an elephant. In 1869, a Tunisian circus with 18 acts, performed at Kalemegdan. Later, the fairground became permanent. Tents were placed, with numerous attractions: panoptikum or collections of curios, okular ("funny" ocular lenses), magicians, fortune tellers, illusionists, etc. Ilija Božić performed here the very first Serbian puppet show, Kuku, Todore. In the mid-1920s the fair was displaced to Voždovac, an eastern suburb at the time, due to the impending construction of the art pavilion. As the new location was too distant for most of the Belgraders, the fair was soon disbanded. The circuses and fairs were so popular, the National Theatre in Belgrade asked for them to be banned from the city during the theatrical season.

=== 20th century ===
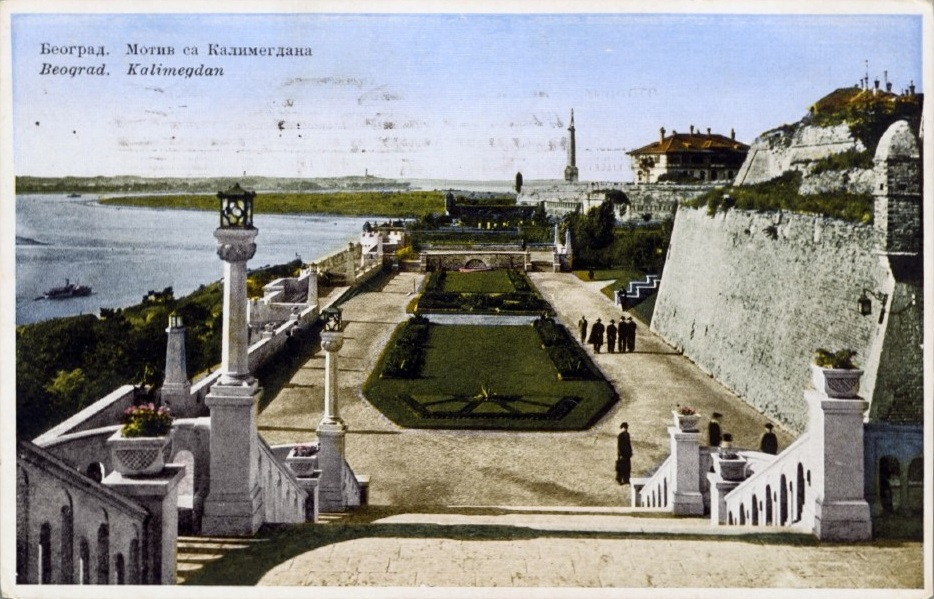
Kalemegdan Park in 1930

The park was damaged during World War I, especially during the heavy Austro-Hungarian bombardment in 1914–1915, prior to occupation. The Serbian army had no proper ammunition to fight the Austrian gunboats, so they freely fired at the city from the Sava river. Diplomat and author Radoje Janković described it in 1914: "Kalemegdan is "trimmed", the trees in the park are battered, the ancient ramparts of Singidunum crushed, all being hit by the heavy, modern artillery, from precisely measured distance and even more precisely unmeasured hatred".

Though already by the 1900s the Kalemegdan gained the appearance of a proper park, it was especially embellished during the Interbellum. In the 1920s and 1930s, new additions within the park were Cvijeta Zuzorić Art Pavilion, Monument of Gratitude to France, sculpture-fountain "Fisherman" by Simeon Roksandić, Belgrade Zoo, busts of poets and writers along the pedestrian pathways, etc.

Actor Nikola Popović (1907–1967) formed the Artistic Theatre in 1939, in order to preserve the tradition of the private professional theatres. As the theatre had no building of its own, they performed at the summer stage in Kalemegdan. The actors continued to perform throughout 1941, even after the German occupation in April, giving 101 performance under the occupation. A one-off motor race was held on the roads surrounding the parks in September 1939, the Belgrade Grand Prix of which the Belgrade City Race was the feature race. It is additionally notable as the last Grand Prix to be held in Europe for many years as fighting in what would become World War II had started just days earlier to the north in Poland.

In the mid-1980s, open-air disco "Crveni Podijum" (Red Podium) was organized in Kalemegdan. It was called the "largest open-air disco in the Balkans" and was known to attract up to 10,000 visitors on some nights. In the 1990s, a club "Underground" was opened in the cave below the park. It was known for the specific type of music: acid jazz, funk, drum and house. The club enjoyed cult status for years but after the change of proprietors, the choice of music also changed and the club began playing folk music. It was closed later.

=== 21st century ===
As of 2013, Kalemegdan Park covered an area of 53 ha (130 acres) and had 3,424 individual trees from 80 different tree species. Most of the trees were between 20 and 60 years old.

On 23 September 2020, six Chinese windmill palm trees were planted in front of the Cvijeta Zuzorić Art Pavilion. Those were the first palms planted in Belgrade in the public green area. Authorities said that the palms will survive the weather as the Belgrade's climate is getting warmer due to the climate change.

== Sections ==
=== Great Kalemegdan Park ===
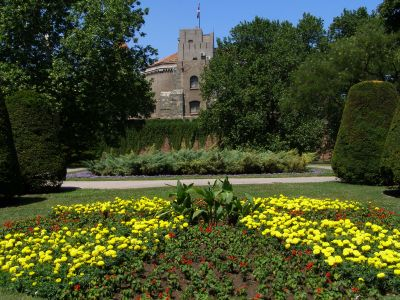
View on the Military Museum

Great Kalemegdan Park (Serbian: Велики калемегдански парк / Veliki kalemegdanski park) or simply Great Kalemegdan (Serbian: Велики Калемегдан / Veliki Kalemegdan), occupies the southern corner of the fortress, with geometrical promenades, a military museum, a museum of forestry and hunting, and the Monument of Gratitude to France.

==== Sava Promenade ====
A pedestrian walkway along the southwest section of the fortress is called Sava Promenade (Serbian: Савска променада / Savska promenada). Due to the static problems, it was renovated in 1932–1933. The project was drafted by the Russian émigré architect Aleksandr Anastyevich Chelpanbaev. It connects the Big and the Small Staircase and is location of many outdoor exhibitions.

==== Pavilion on Sava Promenade ====
A pavilion, with an area of 77 m^{2} (830 sq ft) was built in the 1920s along the Sava Promenade on the southern edge of the fortress. In the 1990s several families squatted in it. By the 2010s, the object was out of use, derelict and half-ruined. Lease of the object was announced in May 2014, but was recalled. It was repeated in July 2016. On 13 September 2017, without any announcements, the object was demolished. An info table was placed later, saying that the works on the reconstruction began on 15 September, two days after the object was completely razed to the ground. After public and media protests, the city owned communal company which administers the fortress, "Beogradska tvrđava", announced that the terrain is being prepared for the new object, which will have an artistic and cultural, but also a catering function. However, while the "Beogradska tvrđava", obtained a permit from the Ministry of construction, only works which will not affect the construction of the object were allowed, not a demolition. Also, at first they refused to disclose which company is the leaseholder, claiming that the investor pays for everything, though the info board named "Beogradska tvrđava" as an investor. As the entire Kalemegdan area is protected by the law, the State Institute for the monuments protection also had to approve any works. They issued a permit, naming which parts of the object have to be preserved and which may be demolished but, nevertheless, the entire house was demolished. "Beogradska tvrđava" claimed that everything has been done transparent and by the book (biddings, planned investments, etc.) but nothing could be found in the official records.

Since then, the leaseholders became known: two companies ("Cig" and "Black Rock"), which are already in the catering business, and which admitted that they planned to build a coffee shop, not to recreate an artistic of cultural pavilion. City sued all three participants, "Beogradska tvrđava", "Cig" and "Black Rock" and on 27 November 2017 the court declared their lease contract void. Only now became known that the contract was signed already on 5 August 2016, while "Cig" and "Black Rock" formed their consortium just one day before. Also, the works were to be finished by the mid-December 2017, after 3 months. Construction inspections visited the site several times and finally ordered the closing of the site and return to the previous state. On their side, State Institute for the monuments protection also banned any further construction. After the demolition, the wholes were dug in the ground, presumably for the new foundations, but in February 2018 the construction yard was abandoned and the dug out holes remained.

Public reactions were negative as from the start it was suspected that a restaurant or a coffee shop will be built. Further controversies, apart from the hidden information and almost absolute ignorance of the reporters and public inquires and refusal of the information disclosing by the "Beogradska tvrđava", were sparked when the bidding paperwork became public in the meantime. Only companies already in the foodservice activities were allowed to participate, even though it was noted that the object is not connected either to the waterworks nor the sewage system, and that there are no requirements to be connected at all.

Ministry of construction confirmed that Ministry of culture issued the permit for archaeological research on the location in December 2017, when the construction site was declared an archaeological dig. Archaeologists made three digs and discovered the artifacts from the Antiquity and the Middle Ages. A fact that the investor didn't provide the proper archaeological survey, which he had to do since it is obligatory when it comes to Kalemegdan, was one of the reasons named for the banning the works by the Institute for the monuments protection. Clandestine works continued in March 2019.

==== Gondola lift ====
In August 2017 the construction of the gondola lift, which would connect Kalemegdan with the neighborhood of Ušće across the Sava, was announced by the city government for 2018. Construction was confirmed in March 2018 when the idea of a pedestrian bridge was dropped after it has been described as "complicated" and "unstable". On the Kalemegdan side, the station will be dug into the hill, 1 m (3 ft 3 in) below the fortress' Sava Promenade. There is a cave 7 m (23 ft) below the projected station, so there is a possibility that the cave will be adapted for visitations and connected to the future gondola station by an elevator. On the Ušćе side, the starting point will be next to the Skate Park, across the Ušće Tower. The entire route is 1 km (0.62 mi) long, of which 300 m (980 ft) will be above the Sava river itself. Estimated cost is €10 million and duration of works 18 months, but it is still not known when the construction will begin. Already existing criticism of the project continued, from the officially used name (gondola instead of a traditional Serbian žičara) and chosen location, to the route, especially the Kalemegdan station which is a collapsible locality above the cave, in the area already prone to mass wasting. Park of the Non-Aligned Countries in the neighborhood of Kosančićev Venac was proposed as the better solution.

Cutting of 47 trees in the park, because of the gondola lift began in March 2019. The pine trees were 50 to 60 years old. With an enlarged price of €15 million and unified opposition to the project by the environmentalists, architects and urbanists, with additional cutting of over 100 trees in Ušće park across the river, this prompted popular protests. Citizens organized and as the city was cutting the trees, they were planting new seedlings. Drilling also began and it was announced that the stone wall will be partially demolished, too. Municipality of Stari Grad also organized protests, demolishing fences on the construction site, filing complaints and fines against city and government officials and announcing 24-hours watch on site and demolition of any structure built in the meantime. Construction of the gondola lift is prohibited by the current Belgrade's General Regulatory Plan from 2016 which stipulates that construction of the "cables for the alternative transportation and recreation" is forbidden in the area of the Belgrade Fortress. The project was also opposed by the Serbian branch of the pan-European Federation for Cultural Heritage Europa Nostra, Serbian Archaeological Society and the History Department of the Serbian Academy of Sciences and Arts (SANU). In its report, Europa Nostra described the project as controversial, irreversibly compromising for the fortress value, legally questionable, without clear purpose or any proper foundation of the idea. The detailed report, compiled by Hermann Parzinger, was delivered to the Serbian government.

Ministry of Construction, Transport and Infrastructure issued the permit for preparatory works on 1 April 2019. However, on 17 April 2019, Belgrade's Administrative Court temporarily halted further works citing legality of the construction permits but also saying that gondola lift may have "irreversible repercussions for both the cultural monument and the physical environment" and "damage wider public interests". Deputy mayor Goran Vesić stated that city "respects the court" but that construction will continue anyway. In May 2019, both the Supervisory and the Administrative board of the Republic Institute for the Protection of Cultural Monuments of Serbia conducted investigation, concluding that the permit issued by the institute was not valid as it was not issued following the necessary guidelines and protocols and excluding experts in the process. Though stating it will obey the court's decision, the ministry filed a lawsuit at the Supreme Court of Cassation against the decision of the Administrative Court. The lawsuit was rejected as the previous ruling of the Administrative Court is a temporary one, not a final decision, so it can not be overturned by the higher court.

Vesić then stated that the gondola will be built, despite the "hysteria of aggressive minority". In an atypically harsh reaction by the SANU addressed specifically to Vesić this time, they responded to "hysterical minority" criticism with listing of over three dozen of national and international organizations who oppose the construction and accused Vesić of misleading, as he always talks about the Kalemegdan Park and not the Belgrade Fortress (which consists of the [former inner] fortress and the park), while the section where the gondola should be dug in is the core of the fortress. The statement concludes with the academy stating that Vesić's reaction "entails us to most firmly oppose to handing over the faith of the historical and cultural monuments, and identities of our cities, to the people whose ambitions and power are in obvious disproportion to their education".

Even though no proper permits have been issued and no work has been done, city already in 2018 paid 267 million dinars (€2.26 million) to the contractor, or 83.5% of the planned investment in the project for 2018, though only 42% of other planned investments were realized. In the 2020 budget, city allocated further €4 million, while Europa Nostra placed the fortress on the list of 14 endangered world heritage localities in Europe, specifically because of the gondola lift project. In March 2020, the fortress was voted one of the Europe's 7 most endangered heritage sites.

In January 2021, Suzana Vasiljević, media advisor to the president of Serbia Aleksandar Vučić, said: "President rejoice over gondola. No one can stop him. No one will stop him to finish that project. I know the man". In March 2021, the Administrative Court fully annulled the 2019 permit issued by the Ministry of Construction. In June 2021, during the amending of the city budget, it was obvious that city still plans to go with the project. Vesić stated that the gondola will be built, and that he didn't understand the bewilderment about it. New mayor from the same party, Aleksandar Šapić, said in September 2022 that the works will continue if they are "not endangering the heritage of Kalemegdan", and that project is "not expensive anyway".

Government's Anti-Corruption Council in its September 2022 report asked for the project to be dropped, describing it as "against public interest, and as such harmful for Belgrade from numerous aspects". The council concluded that the gondola lift might permanently damage basic values of the fortress and endanger UNESCO nomination, labeling the entire project as a textbook on breaking laws, procedures, planning documents, and rejecting numerous experts' opinions. All this combined points to systemic organized corruption. Though construction didn't start by this point, 155 trees have been cut and city paid the contractor 626 million dinars (€5.3 million) in advance, with further 200.000 (€1.700) in 2023 and 420 million (€3.56 million) in 2024 planned in the city budget.

=== Little Kalemegdan Park ===
Little Kalemegdan Park (Serbian: Мали калемегдански парк / Mali kalemegdanski park) or simply Little Kalemegdan (Serbian: Мали Калемегдан / Mali Kalemegdan), occupies the area in the eastern section, which borders the urban section of Belgrade. Northern section of Little Kalemegdan Park is occupied by the Belgrade Zoo, opened in 1936. The Cvijeta Zuzorić Art Pavilion, built in 1928, is also located here.

New city administration headed by mayor Aleksandar Šapić included in the city's urban plan relocation of the Belgrade Zoo out of the fortress in 2022. Šapić announced relocation to the Ada Safari section of Ada Ciganlija island in February 2023. City manager, Miroslav Čučković, explained the relocation: "Since the foundation of the new city administration...we made decisions which are connected to our dedication to spaces to which Belgraders were coming close to in all of these previous years. Those are spaces for which we think should have some new type of content and possibility to directly invest into them". Šapić then added that the "political decision was made to handle this", and, if everything goes by the plan, the relocation might be finished in three years.

Public and experts' backlash against the project was big, mostly regarding hastiness, arbitration, irrelevance, legality and selected location. Public speculated that the residents of the newly built wealthy K-Distrikt residential complex across the zoo are bothered by the animal smell, or that some more lucrative structures might be built instead of the zoo on such exceptional location since "direct investments" were given as one of the reasons. Šapić then retreated a bit, stating this is just a "political idea" which is not hastily made, that only now analyses and surveys will be done to check the viability, that nothing will be built instead of the zoo but the fortress will be conserved instead, and that there is no set time frame for the project.

==== Amusement Park ====
An artificial pond, with small island and pedestrian bridges was formed in front of the zoo. It was destroyed during the bombing in World War II. In 1958, an amusement park (luna park) was open on that same location. Its main attraction, the Ferris wheel, was installed in 1964. In Serbian called "Panorama", it was produced in the United Kingdom, then transported to Italy, while it arrived in Yugoslavia in the early 1950s. It was exhibited in almost all parts of the country, before it permanently settled in Kalemegdan. In 2013 there were only 6 of its kind in the world. Soon, it became a symbol of the park and Belgrade's counterpart of the Vienna's Wiener Riesenrad. When produced, it was the state of the art of its kind. It has a special mechanism which consists of a steel cable and a separate handle which allows for the manual bringing down of the gondolas, in case of power outage.

== Wildlife ==
In October 2019, citizens reported increased number of scorpions in Kalemegdan. Experts explained those are Carpathian scorpions (Euscorpius carpathicus), which are small and, though they can sting, not poisonous for humans. Biologists said that there is no reason for panic, as the number of scorpions is stable and not enlarged, adding that scorpions live in this area for 50 million years, while humans settled some 3,000 years ago.

== Protection ==
On 29 February 1952 city adopted the "Decision on protection, adaptation and maintenance of the people's park of Kalemegdan" which set the borders of the protected areas as the rivers of Danube and Sava and the streets of Tadeuša Košćuškog and Pariska. In 1962, Belgrade's Institute for the cultural monuments protection expanded the zone to several blocks across the streets. Detailed plan on Kalemegdan from 1965 provided that, despite the immense archaeological value that lies beneath the fortress ground, basically only what was discovered by that time can be explored, restored or protected. That caused the problem both for the expansion of the park but even more for the further exploration of the fortress' underground. Best example is the Lower Town where neither the park fully developed nor the remains of the former port, which was located there, are visible.

== Proposed tunnels ==
When Emilijan Josimović drafted the first official urban plan for Belgrade in 1867, he envisioned a tunnel below the modern park area. This way, he planned to connect the Sava Port, in Savamala, and the Danube Port, in Dorćol.

In the 20th century, a 200 m (660 ft) long tunnel have been proposed along the eastern section of the park for decades. It would actually follow the route of the Pariska Street, between the streets of Gračanička and Uzun Mirkova. This would allow for the ground level to be transformed into the plateau with a fountain, which would make an extension of the pedestrian zone of Knez Mihailova and create a continuous pedestrian zone from the Republic Square and Palace Albania to the park, the fortress and the rivers. It was envisioned by the first phase of the planned Belgrade Metro, 1973–1982.

A bit longer version, from the Gračanička Street to monument of Rigas Feraios in the Tadeuša Košćuškog Street, resurfaced in 2012, in conjunction with the project of connecting the Savamala port and the fortress. In March 2012 it was announced that the construction will start by the end of the year. However, the planners from the 1970s version were against the execution, because they believed that the entire complex can exist only if there are already functioning subway lines, which as of 2018, are still not built. This way, the traffic problems won't be solved. Due to the price, general halt of the subway construction and constant changes in its routes, the project hasn't materialized yet.

== Administration ==
While it was inhabited, Kalemegdan formed one of the quarters in the administrative division of Belgrade. It was called Grad, and translated in the foreign languages as "fortress". According to the censuses, it had a population of 2,219 in 1890, 2,281 in 1895, 2,777 in 1900, 2,396 in 1905 and 454 in 1910. The quarter was abolished on 24 August 1913.

With the neighboring residential area, Kalemegdan formed one of the local communities (mesna zajednica, a sub-municipal administrative unit), which had a population of 3,650 in 1981, 3,392 in 1991 and 2,676 in 2002. Municipality of Stari Grad, on whose territory Kalemegdan is located, later abolished local communities.

== Gallery ==
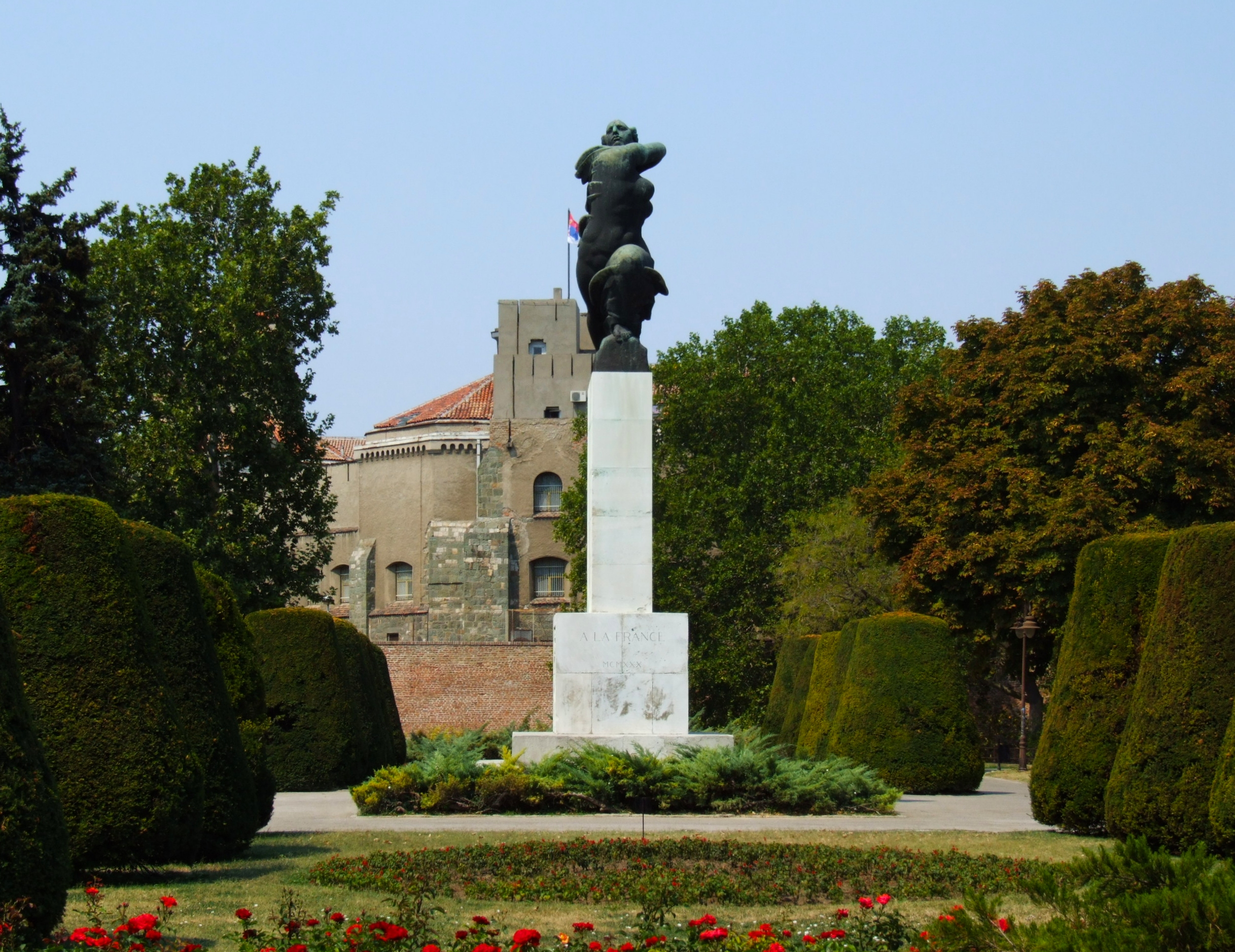
Monument of Gratitude to France

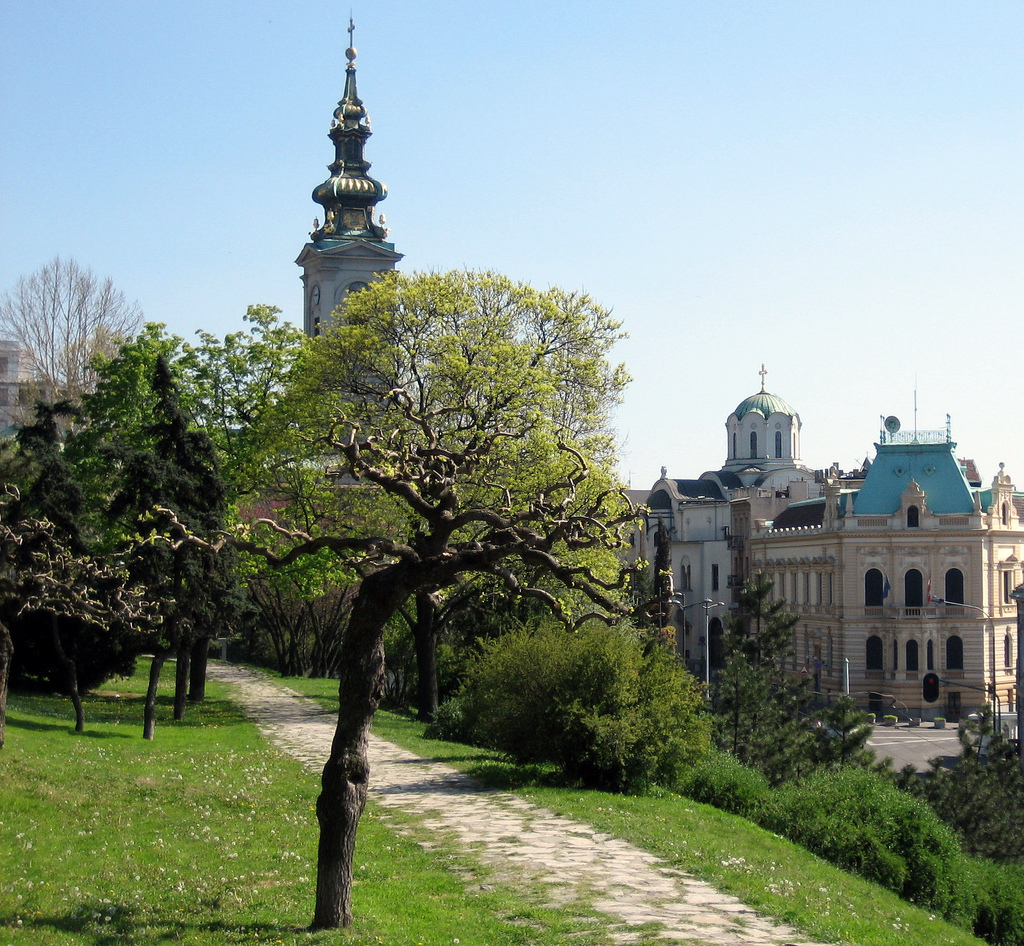
Lower Sava Promenade of Great Kalemegdan

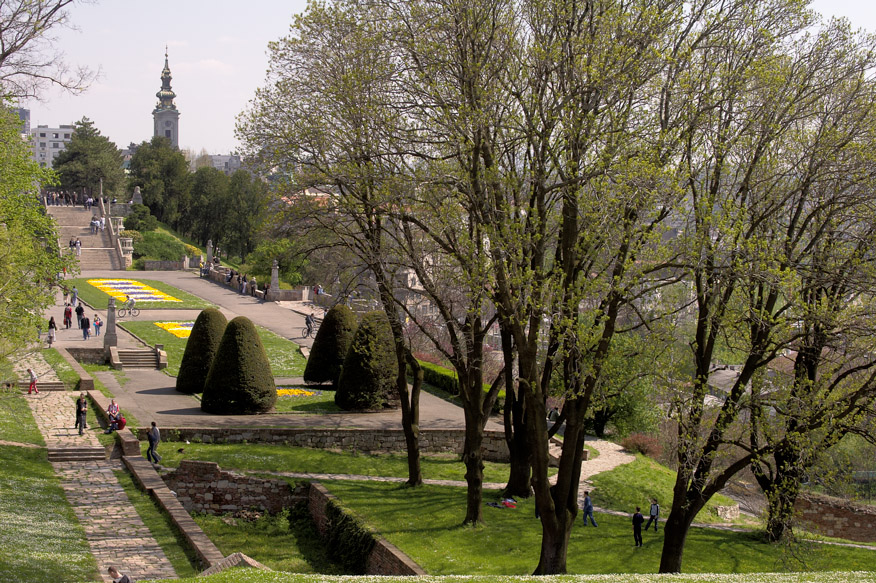
Great Kalemegdan with the Big Staircase

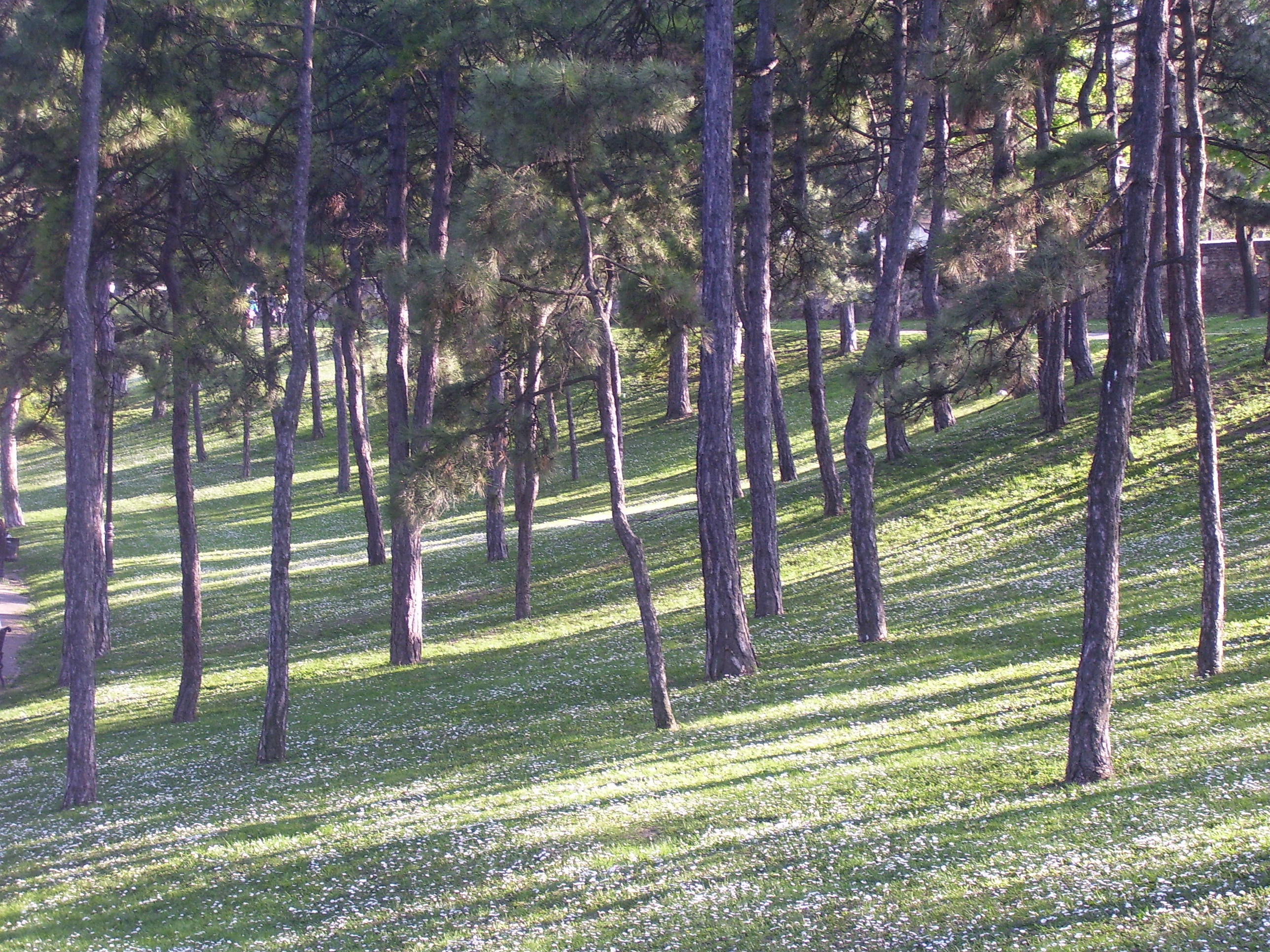
Section of Little Kalemegdan between Cvijeta Zuzorić Art Pavilion and Belgrade Zoo

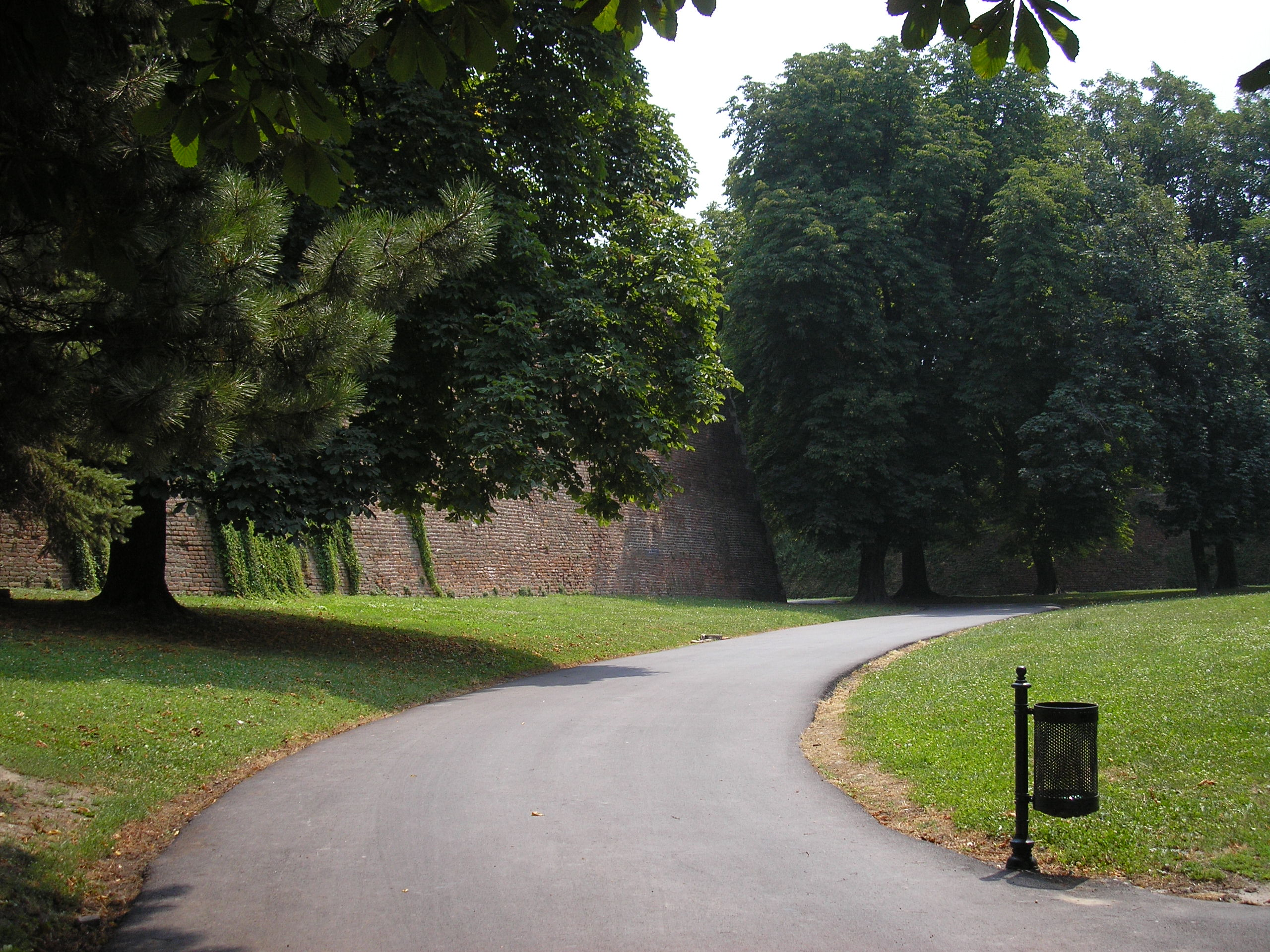
Walkway in Great Kalemegdan

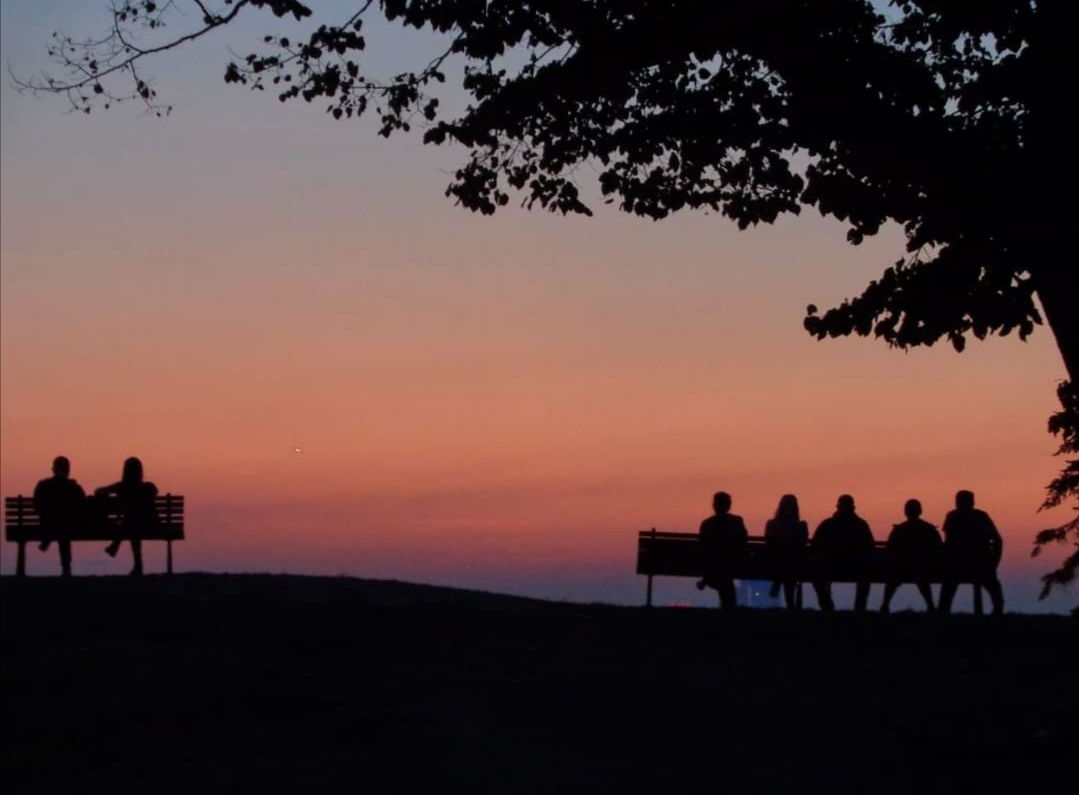

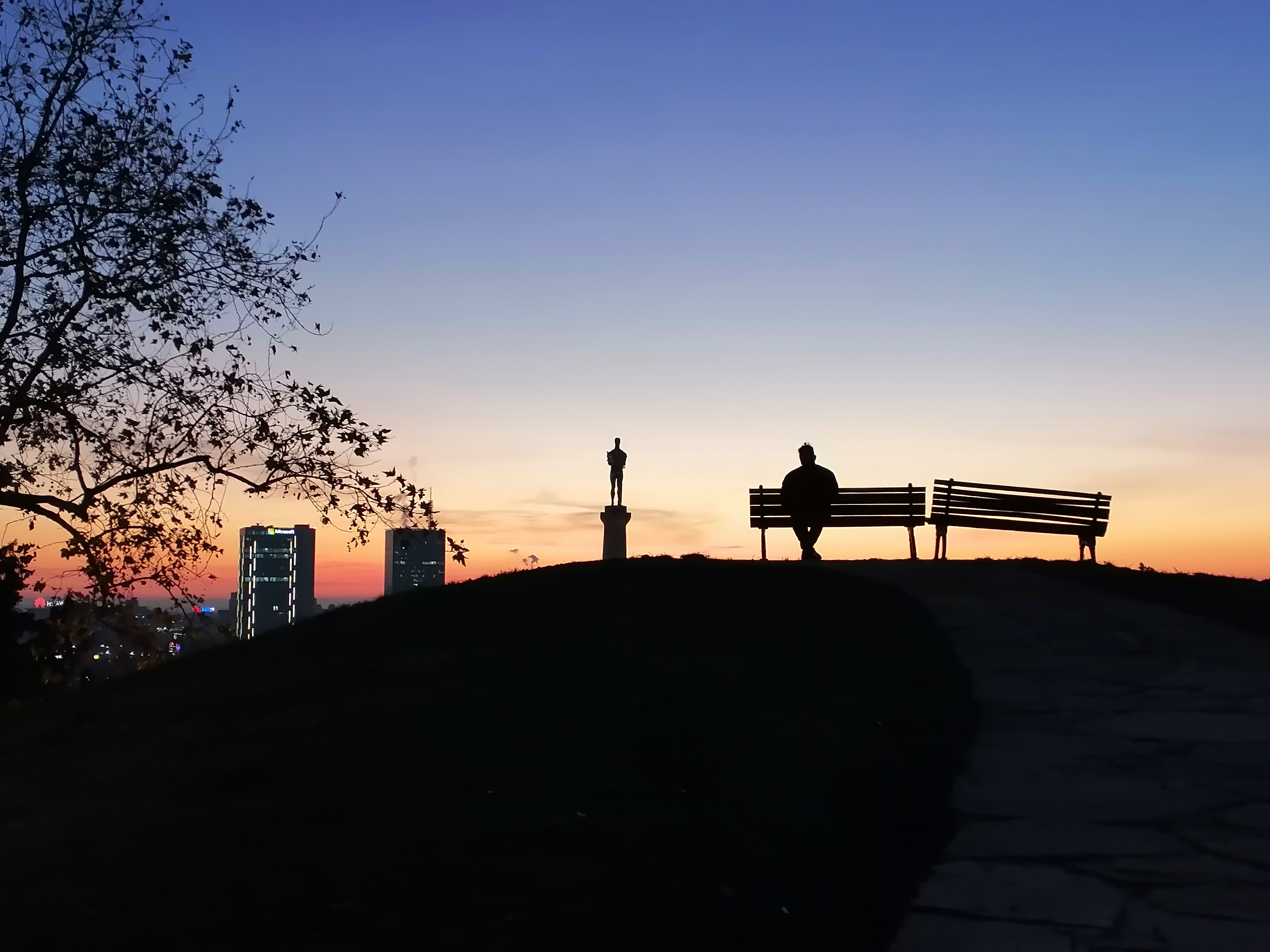

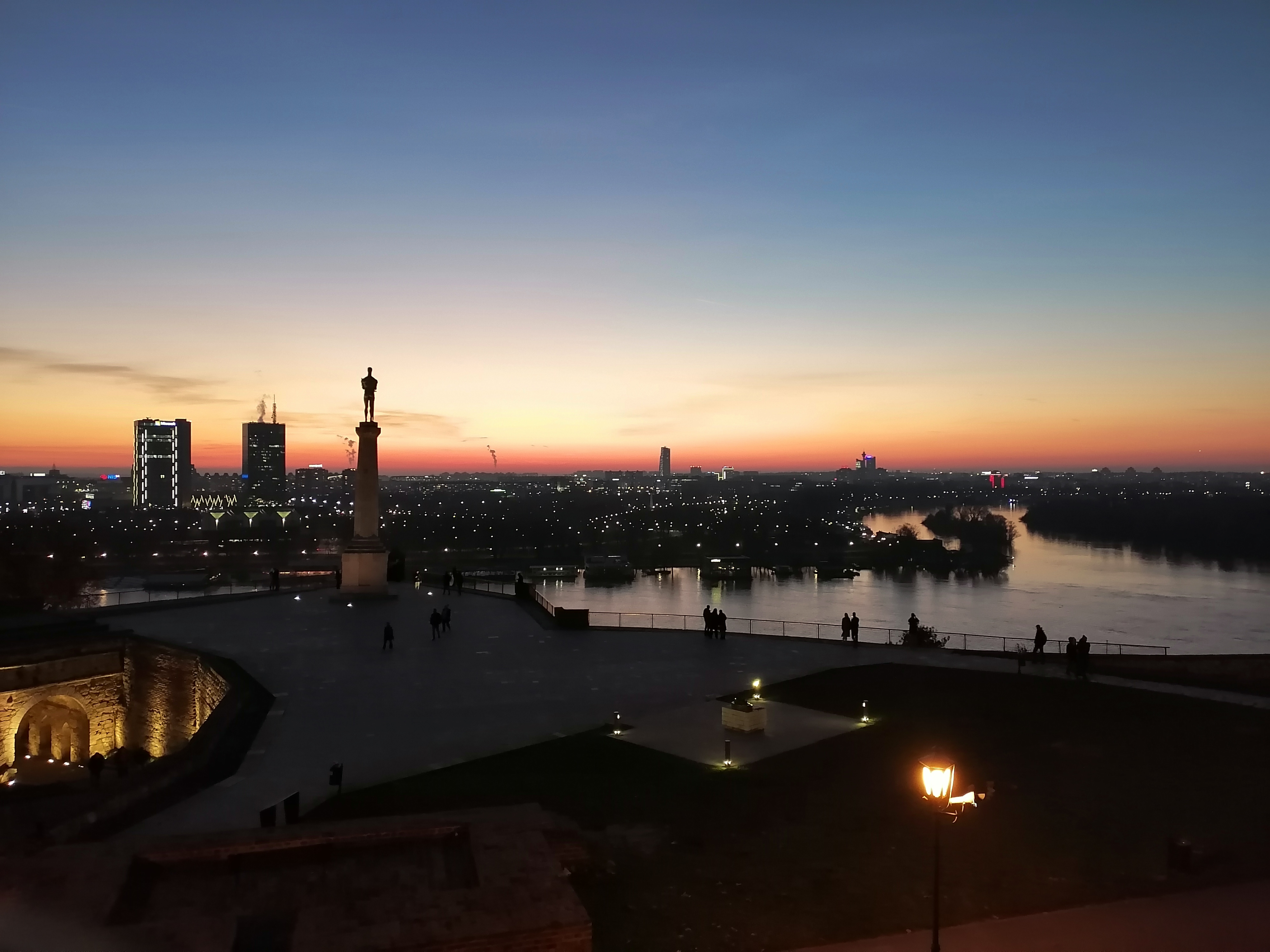
