= Pietà (Meštrović) =

Croatian marble statue

- Roman Pietà, Rimska Pietà (Croatian)
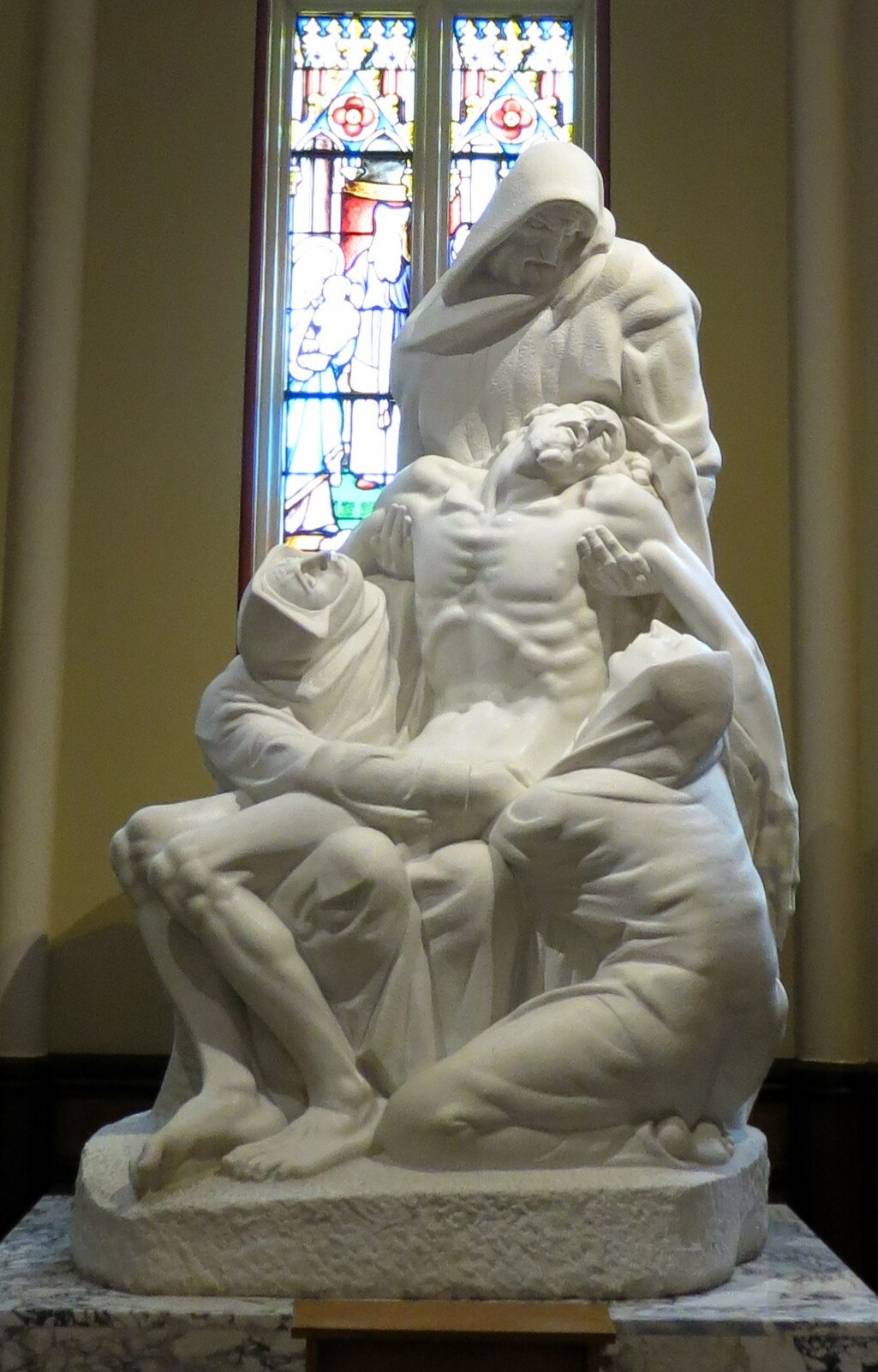
- The marble Pietà of Ivan Meštrović
- The location of the statue today Click on the map to see marker.
- Artist: Ivan Meštrović
- Year: 1942-1946
- Completion date: 1946
- Medium: Carrara marble
- Subject: Jesus and Mary
- Dimensions: 335 cm (11 ft)
- Weight: 6 tons
- Location: Basilica of the Sacred Heart (Notre Dame); 41°42′09″N 86°14′23″W
- Owner: University of Notre Dame

The Pietà (1942 - 1946) is a marble statue by Croatian artist Ivan Meštrović housed in the Basilica of the Sacred Heart on the campus of the University of Notre Dame. It is considered one of his most celebrated works. Meštrović conceived the work while imprisoned in Zagreb by the Ustaše and then sculpted it in Rome from a six-ton block of Carrara marble. It is hence also known as Roman Pieta (Croatian: Rimska Pietà). Meštrović also made several copies of the work which are now held at the Ivan Meštrović Gallery, Vatican Museums, and Pontifical Croatian College.

Meštrović brought the sculpture to America when he emigrated in 1946. The Pieta was housed at the Metropolitan Museum of Art in New York City from 1947 to 1955, as part of an exhibit dedicated to Meštrović, the museum's first ever solo exhibition of a living artist. Meštrović refused the Yugoslav's government offer to buy the statue, and instead opted to bring it to the University of Notre Dame in 1955, where it was placed in the Church of the Sacred Heart. The statue represents the Pietà, a subject in Christian art depicting the Mary cradling the mortal body of Jesus after his descent from the Cross, and is intended to embody the suffering of all of humanity.

== History ==
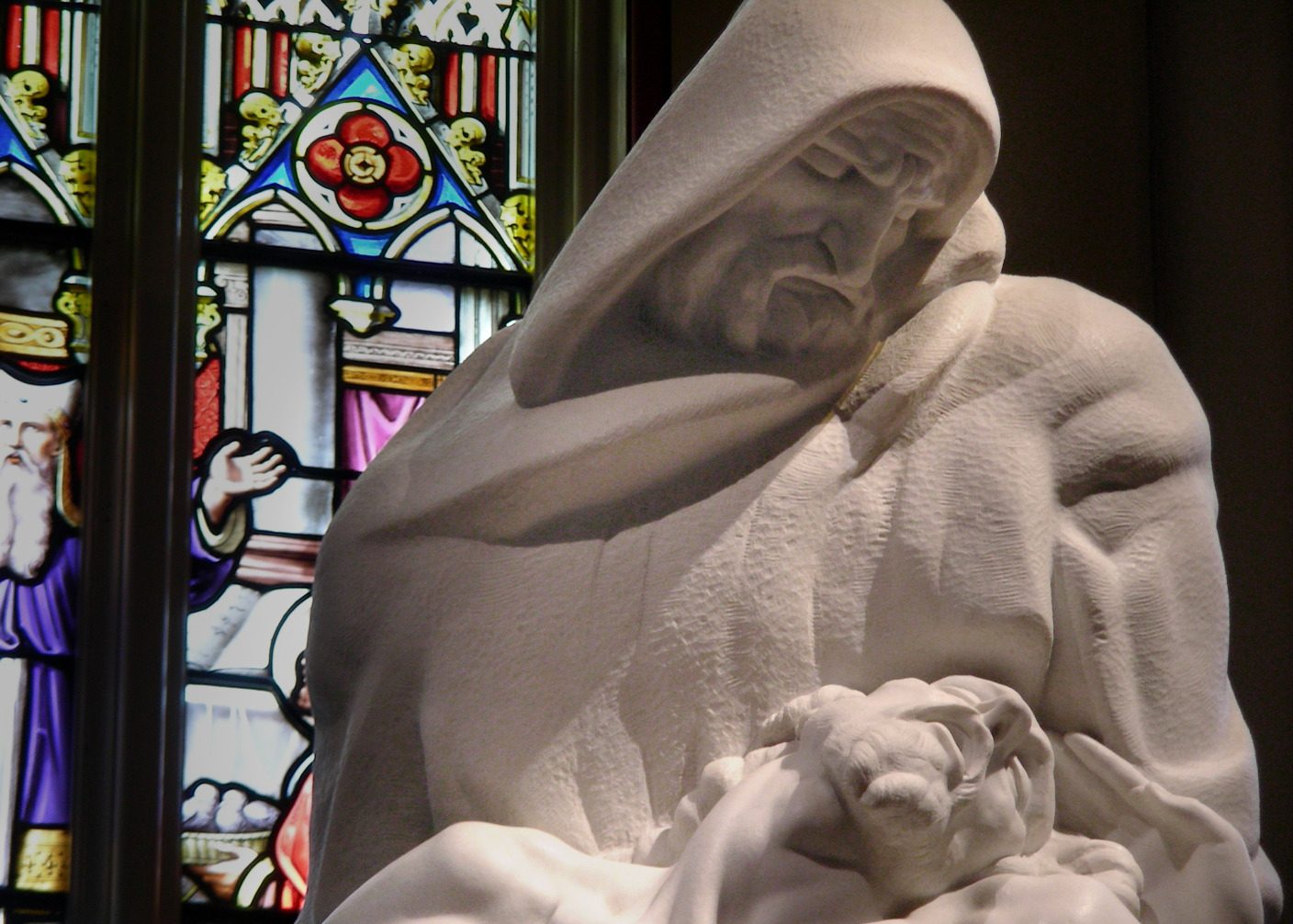
Detail of the faces of Nicodemus and Jesus

In the early twentieth century, Meštrović was one of the prominent artists in Croatia and Yugoslavia. He was living in Split during the April War in 1941, when Yugoslavia was invaded by the Axis powers and Croatia became a puppet state of Nazi Germany, the Independent State of Croatia (NDH). After being warned by novelist and NDH minister Mile Budak that the authorities could not guarantee his safety in Split, he moved to Zagreb in September 1941. The Croatian fascist Ustaše, allies of the Nazi in occupied Croatia, arrested Meštrović and painter Jozo Kljaković on 7 November 1941, ostensibly due to the regime's fears that the two would emigrate. Meštrović had refused to cooperate with fascist authorities and had refused an invitation to Berlin in 1930 from Adolf Hitler, who hence considered him an enemy. While in the Savska Cesta prison in Zagerb, he started conceptualizing the statue of the Pietà. He obtained some brown wrapping paper from some prison guards and made sketches of the planned statue. He was released from prison five months later thanks to the mediation of the Vatican and Catholic authorities. One of the conditions of his release was his participation at the 1942 Venice Biennale, when he represented the Independent State of Croatia. He then moved to Rome where he stayed at the Pontifical Croatian College of St. Jerome and sculpted a clay model for the Pietà. In 1943 he went to Switzerland and returned to Rome in 1946, where he carved the 11.2 feet tall Pietà from a six-ton piece of Carrara marble. He also produced a bronze copy of the statue, which today is kept in the Vatican museums.

In 1946, Meštrović moved to the United States, in a self-imposed exile from his home and Yugoslavia, whose Communist policies he rejected. He accepted a professor position at Syracuse University. One of the works he brought to America was the marble Pietà. The sculpture was exhibited at the Metropolitan Museum of Art from April 10, 1947, to 1955, as part of an exhibition on Meštrović, the museum's first ever solo exhibition of a living artist. In 1949, the Montenegrin politician Milovan Đilas was sent to New York by Josip Broz Tito to meet with Meštrović and try to persuade him to return to Yugoslavia. He offered him, among other things, that the state buy the sculpture for 150,000 dollars and place it in a museum, which Meštrović refused because it was a sculpture with an intimate and religious theme, and the government at that time was against religion. Throughout his life, Tito tried to persuade Meštrović to return home, but Meštrović disliked communism as much as he had disliked fascism, and chose to remain in exile.As seen in his later correspondence with Svetozar Rittig, Meštrović's condition was that the statue be placed in the Zagreb Cathedral.

Instead, the artwork went to the University of Notre Dame. In November 1955 the Pietà was transported to Notre Dame after being polished and cleaned. It was transported from New York to South Bend on an open trailer-truck, with the statue in full view of the other drivers, who reportedly doubled in their track to better view it. Bridges and underpasses on the route were checked in advance for their weight-bearing and size to allow for safe transportation of the large sculpture. In order to host the statue, the floor of the Sacred Heart Church was reinforced with steel and concrete and a pedestal built. The placement of the work in a church fulfilled Meštrović's wish of seeing the Pietà installed in a religious setting.

=== Copies ===
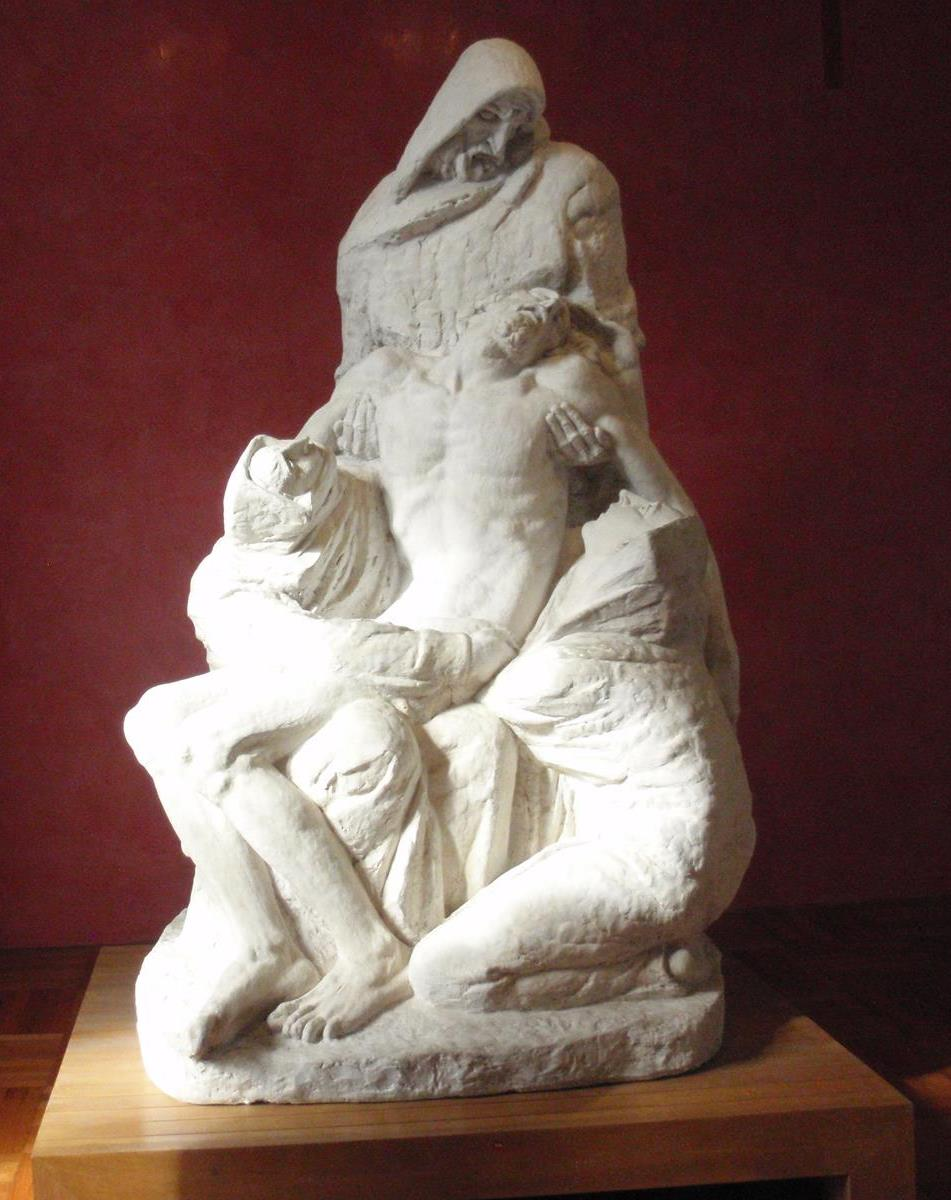
Plaster copy in Split, Croatia

There are several versions and copies of the work. All copies are in different materials, according to the will of Meštrović. A plaster copy is found at the Ivan Meštrović Gallery in Split along with bronze castings of the heads of Jesus, Mary, and Mary Magdalene from the sculpture. This copy in Split is owned by the Meštrović' heir, who sold it in 2023 for 2.3 million kuna. A bronze copy was cast at the Fonderia Artistica Bruni foundry with dimensions of 245 x 132 x 107 cm and was donated on November 21, 1973, to the Collection of Modern and Contemporary Art, Vatican Museums. A 1960 plaster model of the statue is found in the sacristy of the Pontifical Croatian College of St. Jerome.

== Analysis ==
The work is intended to represents the suffering of all of humanity. Meštrović recapitulated his own tragic experience of captivity, as well as the suffering that he, his family and humanity endured in the whirlwind of war. In particular, the grief of a mother for her dead son symbolizes the human suffering of World War II. All three figures are presented in common lamentation but at the same time also in personal inner grief at contemplating the death of the living God. The Pieta, together with his work Job at Syracuse University, is connected to the theme of human suffering that he pondered while in prison and is considered one of his best, if not the best, works in his late career.

Meštrović used a style of deliberate linear design, with the texture of the marble made rough for clothes while smooth for skin, a technique used for many of his other works. The figure of Nicodemus bears the facial figures of Meštrović himself, an example of artistic self-insertion. This technique was used by many artists of the past including Michelangelo, who Meštrović greatly admired. The facial figure of his wife Olga are instead found in those of Mary and Magdalene.

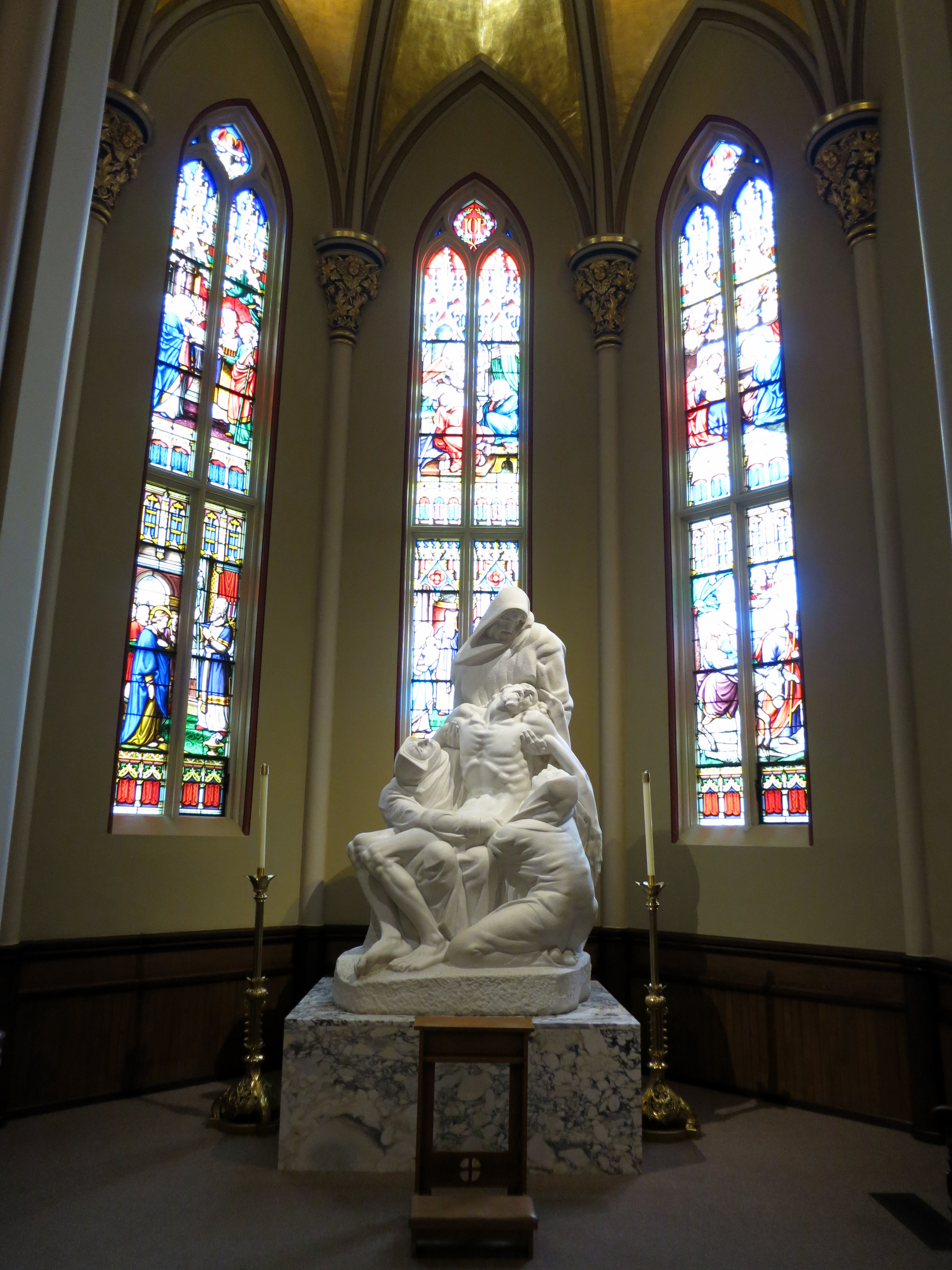
Pieta in its location in the side chapel in the Basilica of the Sacred Heart

The sculpture is inspired by Michelangelo's Florentine Pietà, of which it reproduces the composition, with the figures of Nicodemus, Mary Magdalene and Mary found in a zigzagging fashion in a pyramidal arrangement. The pathos of Meštrović's work is very different from that of Michelangelo, with the figures exhibiting deep, physical and psychological suffering while Michelangelo's work showed more serene and sorrow. The dramatic emotions are heightened by the sharp angels and the contrast between the lifeless, naked, and limp body of Jesus with the other figures, who are fully clothed, tense, and immersed in intense anguish.

The New York Times defined it "marvelous organization, design, and rhythm". According to Susan Brabant Baxter, the sculpture reflects Rudolf von Laban's theory of gathering and scattering, with the figure of Jesus scattering vitality and life, while the other figures gather him for burial. In the early twentieth century, Meštrović was one of the few artists to tackle religious themes and receive appreciation both from art critics and religious faithful alike.

== See also ==
- The Bowman and The Spearman
- St. Jerome the Priest

== Bibliography ==
- Šeparović Palada, Maja, Rimska Pieta, Split: Muzeji Ivana Meštrovića, 2017, 978-953-7396-43-5
- Meštrović, Maria; Tanner, Marcus; Meštrović, Ivan (2008). Ivan Meštrović: the making of a master. London: Stacey International. ISBN 978-1-905299-62-1.
- Meštrović, Ivan; Lauck, Anthony Joseph (1974). Ivan Meštrović: The Notre Dame Years. Art Gallery University of Notre Dame
