= Basilica of the Sacred Heart (Notre Dame) =

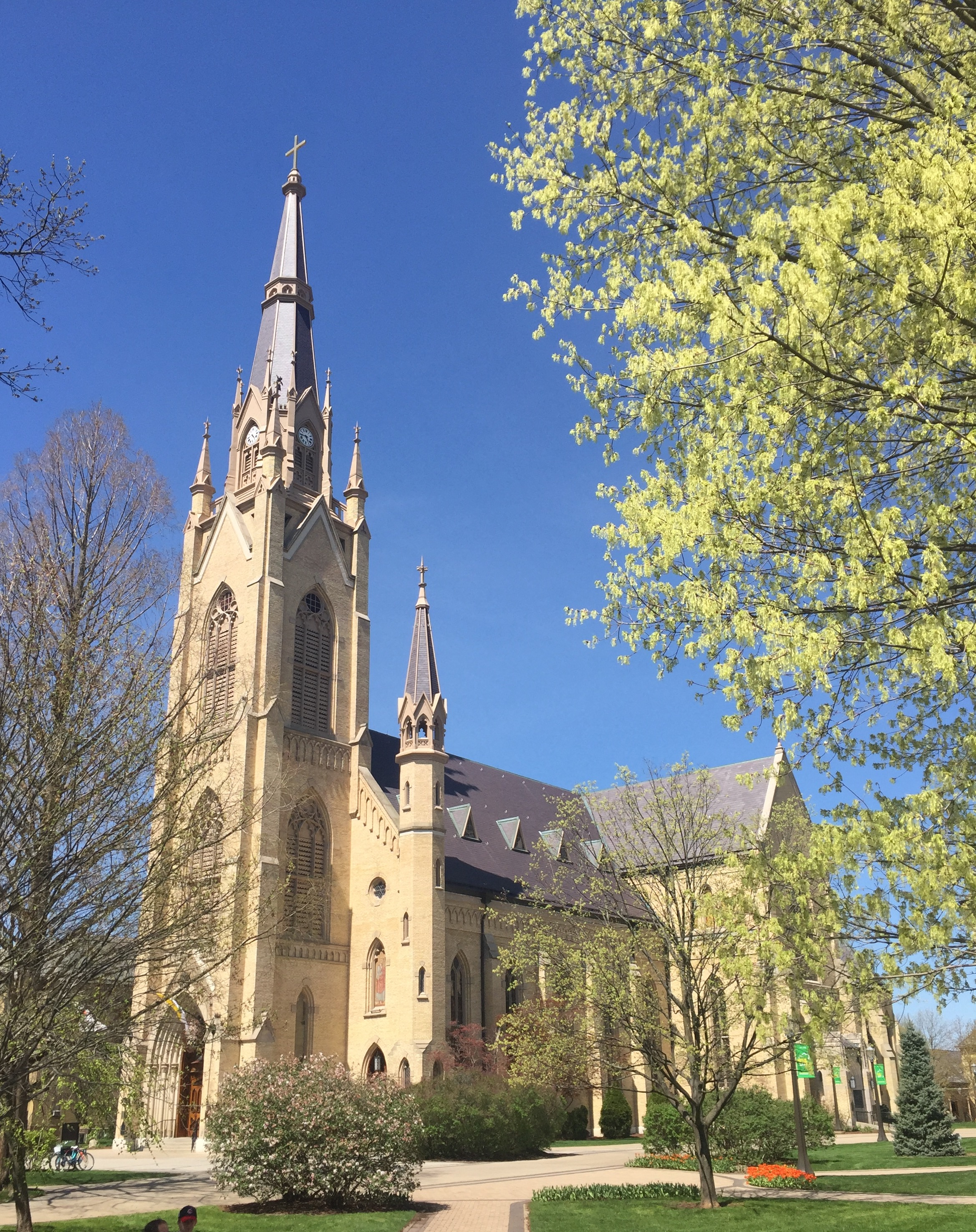
- Basilica looking northwest from the Main Quad
- Basilica of the Sacred Heart
- Location: University of Notre Dame; Notre Dame, Indiana
- Country: United States
- Denomination: Catholic Church

History
- Status: University church Mother church of the Congregation of Holy Cross in the United States
- Consecrated: 15 August 1888

Architecture
- Functional status: Active
- Architect(s): Edward Sorin, Alexis Granger
- Architectural type: Basilica
- Style: Gothic Revival
- Groundbreaking: 1870

Specifications
- Capacity: 1,000
- Length: 275 feet (84 m)
- Width: 114 feet (35 m)
- Height: 230 feet (70 m)
- Materials: Brick, limestone

Administration
- Diocese: Fort Wayne–South Bend

Clergy
- Rector: Rev. Brian C. Ching, C.S.C.
- Basilica of the Sacred Heart
- U.S. Historic district – Contributing property
- Location within Indiana
- Location: Notre Dame, Indiana
- Coordinates: 41°42′09″N 86°14′23″W
- Built: 1871-1888
- Architect: Father Alexis Granger, Father Edward Sorin and Brother Charles Harding
- Architectural style: Gothic Revival
- Part of: University of Notre Dame: Main and South Quadrangles (ID78000053)
- Added to NRHP: 23 May 1978

The Basilica of the Sacred Heart in Notre Dame, Indiana, is a Catholic church on the campus of the University of Notre Dame, also serving as the mother church of the Congregation of Holy Cross (C.S.C.) in the United States. The neo-gothic church has 44 large stained glass windows and murals completed over a 17-year period by the Vatican painter Luigi Gregori. The basilica bell tower is 230 feet (70 m) high, making it the tallest university chapel in America. It is a contributing building in Notre Dame's historic district listed on the National Register of Historic Places. The basilica is a major tourist attraction in Northern Indiana, and is visited annually by more than 100,000 tourists.

== History ==
In 1686, Fr. Claude-Jean Allouez, S.J., established the Ste-Marie-des-Lacs mission on the south shore of the St. Mary's lake, in order to serve the local Potawatomi tribe along with French trappers and settlers in the area. The French Catholic missionaries were expelled by the British from the area following the French and Indian War in 1763, but in 1832 Ste-Marie-des-Lacs was re-established by Stephen Badin and the Log Chapel was built.

=== The first church ===
When Rev. Edward Sorin, C.S.C., established the University of Notre Dame, the community held religious services in the small log cabin built by Stephen Badin. This was replaced by a larger log cabin built by Sorin and dedicated on 19 March 1843, slightly to the east of Badin's log chapel and about the same size.

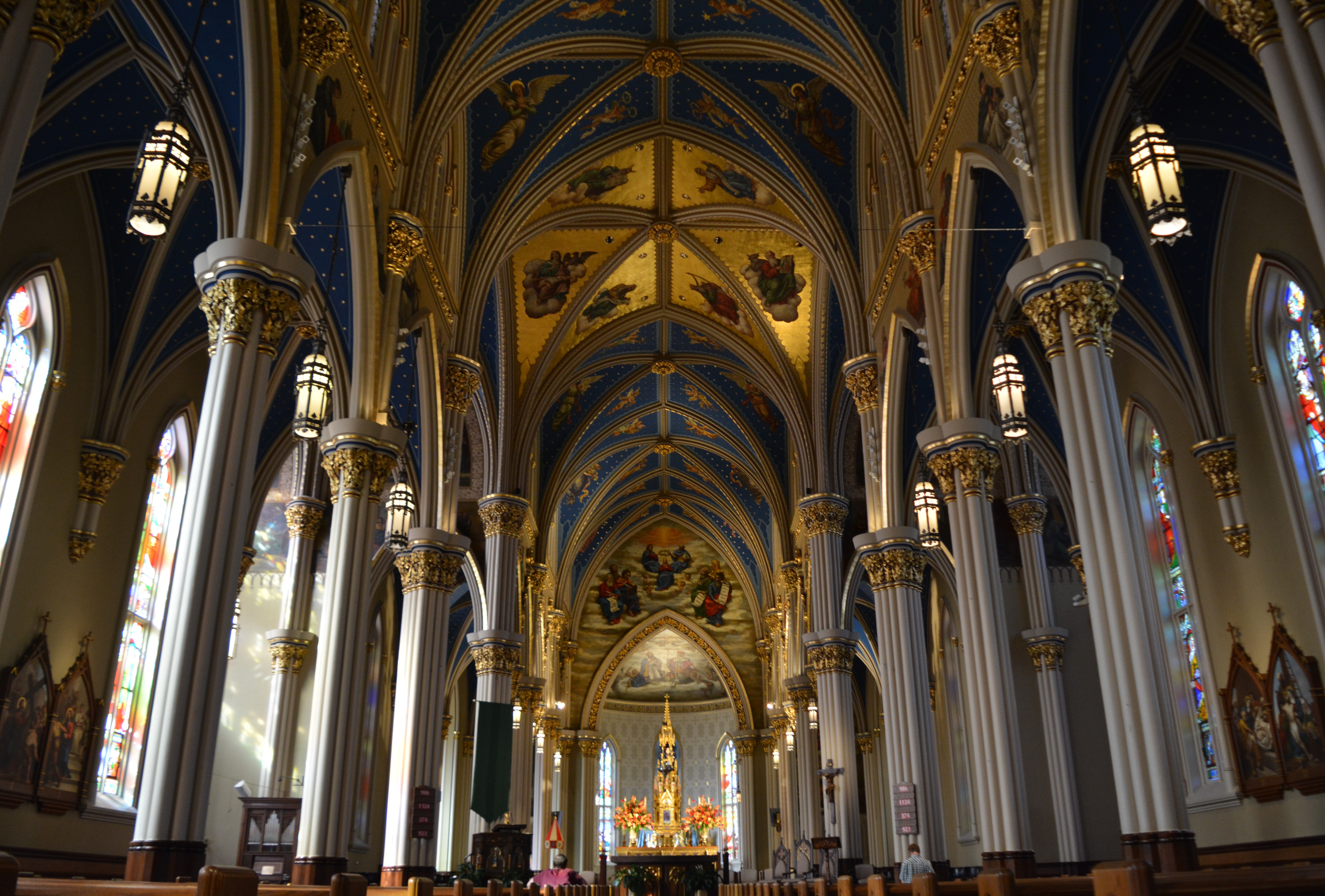
Nave and vaulted ceiling

Sorin's log chapel had become much too small for the needs of the growing college, and despite the lack of funds, Sorin decided to start construction on a proper church building in August 1847. School leaders decided to spend $1500 to construct a new edifice. Work began on 25 May 1848, and the structure was dedicated on 12 November the following year. The solemn consecration took place a year later, on 11 November 1849, with Bishop of Vincennes, Maurice de St. Palais presiding. The building was 90 feet long, 38 wide, and 20 high, with twin towers on its front, and was located next to the college building. Father Sorin described the first church: "The style is Greek, with rounded arches. There are three vaults and six columns which produce a very pretty effect. The tribune, which has been built for the use of the Sisters, is elliptical like the sanctuary. It is already enriched with an organ of Mr. H. Erben, and, though a little weak for the church, is one of its most precious ornaments." The church was built in Carpenter Gothic. The chancel organ had 1527 pipes and part of the statuary was donated by King Louis Philippe of France.

Shortly after the completion of the church, the university added a bell to its tower. In the spring of 1851, the wind swept tower and bell to the ground. That summer, university leaders purchased a larger bell in Cincinnati weighing 3,220 pounds (1,460 kg) and installed it in one of the church towers after it was blessed on the feast of the Assumption. In 1852, double spires were built by a local carpenter in exchange for his son's tuition at the school. The church contained two round stained glass windows purchased from the Carmel du Mans Glassworks of Le Mans. A third window, a gift to Sorin from the Carmelites, depicted "The Divine Face". Sorin, on a visit to France some years later, purchased a carillon. Initially placed on the tower spires, those proved too weak, and a standalone bell tower was the constructed and placed in front of the church.

In 1864 the church was the venue of the funeral (performed by Rev. Sorin) of Charles Celestine Sherman, infant son of William Tecumseh Sherman and Eleanor Boyle Ewing Sherman, who died at age five months. The infant was buried in Cedar Grove Cemetery before being moved to the family plot at Calvary Cemetery in St. Louis.

=== The second (and present) church ===
The university's needs soon outgrew the small first church and in spring of 1869 the leaders decided to build a new church dedicated to Our Lady of the Sacred Heart, despite the lack of funds in the school's treasury.

Popular architect Patrick Keely drew the first plans which envisioned a baroque plan similar to the Church of the Gesu in Rome. Because of the limited budget, the church at Notre Dame was not to be as large or as elaborate as the Roman edifice, but rather the size of the church of the same name in Montreal. The original plan featured a cruciform church two hundred feet in length with three naves and a transept, a dome over the crossing, two large bell-towers, and a capacity of 2,000. The estimated cost would be around $100,000.

Fr. Sorin decided that these plans were too grandiose, and that the church could not cost more than half that sum, since at the moment they had only about $8,000 at hand. In January 1870, a new architect, Mr. T. Brady from St. Louis, drew new plans for the church. It is not sure who drew the definite plans, but it is likely that also Fr. Sorin, Rev. Alexis Granger, C.S.C., and Irish-born Brother Charles Borromeo Harding, C.S.C., a self-taught campus builder, were part of the planning and building. The new church was erected in Gothic Revival architecture rather than baroque, reflecting Fr. Sorin's French taste and his will to build a remarkable and striking landmark. Work on the foundations for the new church began in the spring of 1870, and the cornerstone was laid on 31 May 1871, with six bishops present, including Cincinnati Archbishop John Purcell. The building took many years to finish and underwent many changes. As soon as it was habitable, university leaders installed an organ and held functions and celebrations in the unfinished building. The first mass was held on 15 August 1875. In 1887, the Lady Chapel was added; the north end of the church, completed in 1875, was previously bricked off. Bishop Joseph Gregory Dwenger finally consecrated the new sanctuary on 15 August 1888, during the celebrations for the golden jubilee of the ordination of Edward Sorin. The steeple was completed in 1892.

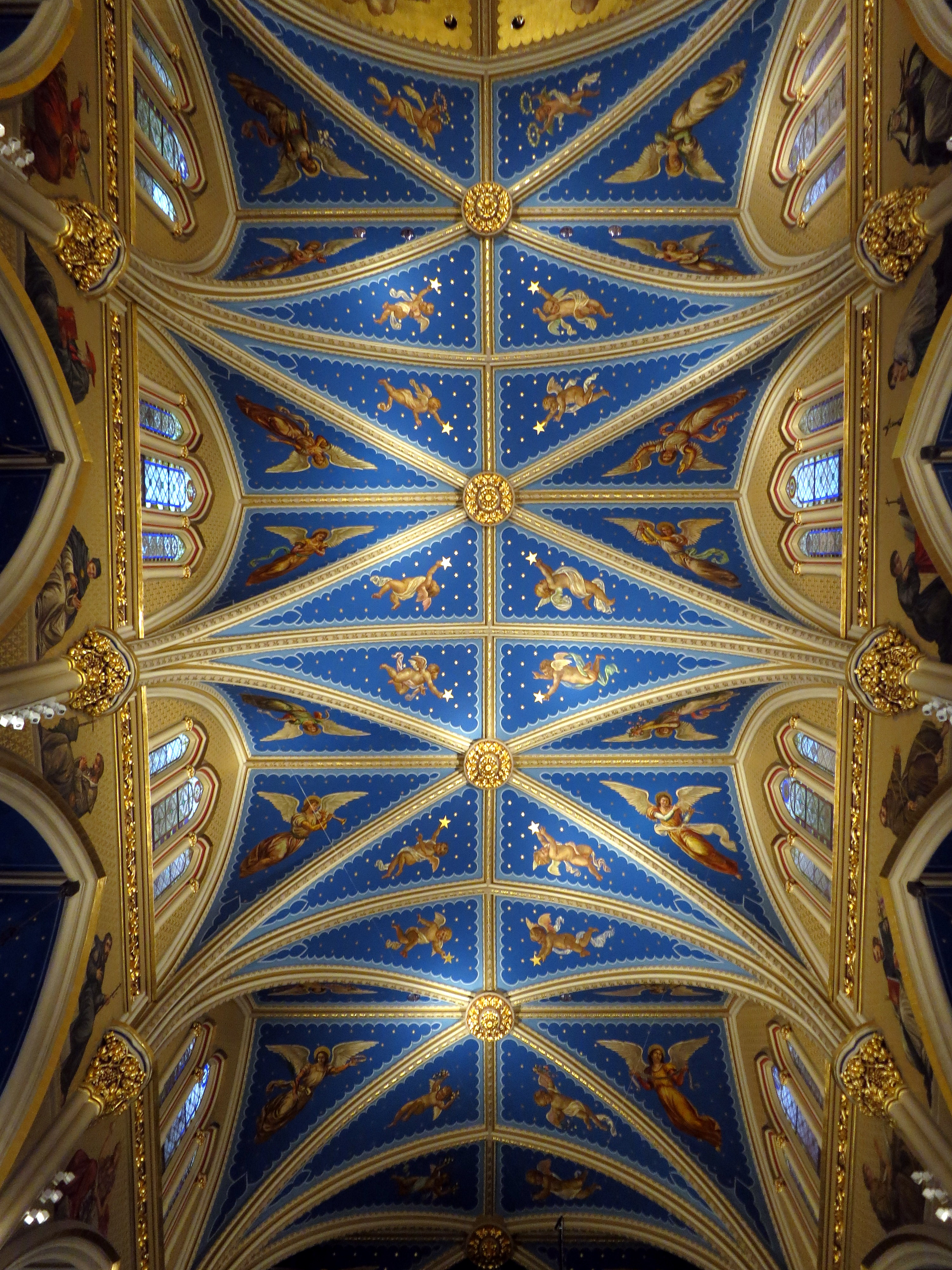
Ceiling of the nave

When the new church was begun in 1870, Fr. Sorin decided to order glass windows from the Carmel du Mans Glassworks, owned by the Carmelite nuns, who had provided windows for the first church in 1863 and with whom Sorin had a long-standing relationship. This was a large order, which amounted to more than 450 square meters of glass. Meanwhile, the Carmel du Mans Glassworks had been suffering financial troubles, also in part due to the Franco-Prussian war of 1870. To keep the business solvent and the workers employed, the Carmelites replaced the windows of their own chapel in 1871, featuring Carmelite saints (these drawings would also be re-used in the windows sold to Notre Dame). In 1873, the Carmelite nuns sold the Glasswork business to Edouard Rathouis, glasswork importer and nephew of Mother Eléonore, mother prioress of the nuns. This sale occurred only a few months after the order for the Notre Dame windows had begun, hence only the first windows painted in 1874 were made by the Carmelites themselves.

To pay for the windows, due to the financial troubles Notre Dame was in given the Long Depression and the 1879 fire of the main building, sponsors were solicited. Major contributors to buy the windows were Alexis Coquillard and Sister M. Germaine of the Passion, CSC, who donated her inheritance of seventeen thousand francs for the chapel and sanctuary windows. Additionally, Notre Dame received a ten percent commission on all windows ordered due to Sorin's influence, who publicized the company in America. The Carmel du Mans Glassworks realized the potential publicity of a large order in America, and hence did a high-quality job and also signed all their windows with the company name, which they previously had not done. In 1880, Edouard Rathouis sold the Carmel du Mans Glasswork to Eugène Hucher. This is reflected in the signage of the windows, which read first "Carmel du Mans, E. Rathouis" (in the earlier works in the nave) and finally "Fabrique du Carmel du Mans, Hucher et Fils, Successors" (in the last windows in the Lady Chapel). The contract for the windows was negotiated by Sorin and signed by Auguste Lemonnier, CSC, who was president at the time.

In April 1899, the church was the site of the first wireless transmission in the United States by Jerome Green and his assistants. He then went on to replicate these experiments the following month in Chicago.

The church was the location of the funeral of Knute Rockne, following his death in a plane crash in 1931. CBS, WGN in Chicago and WSBT, a local station, broadcast the services from the church.

In 1931, it underwent its first thorough renovation by New York architect Wilfred E. Anthony. A new automatic clock was placed in the tower and the chimes were automated so that bells would strike on the quarter hour. Additionally, bars of some music were also automated to ring on occasion.

On 25 October 1936 the church was visited by Cardinal Secretary of State Eugenio Pacelli, future Pope Pius XII, on his stop at Notre Dame during his visit to the United States.

=== Recent history ===
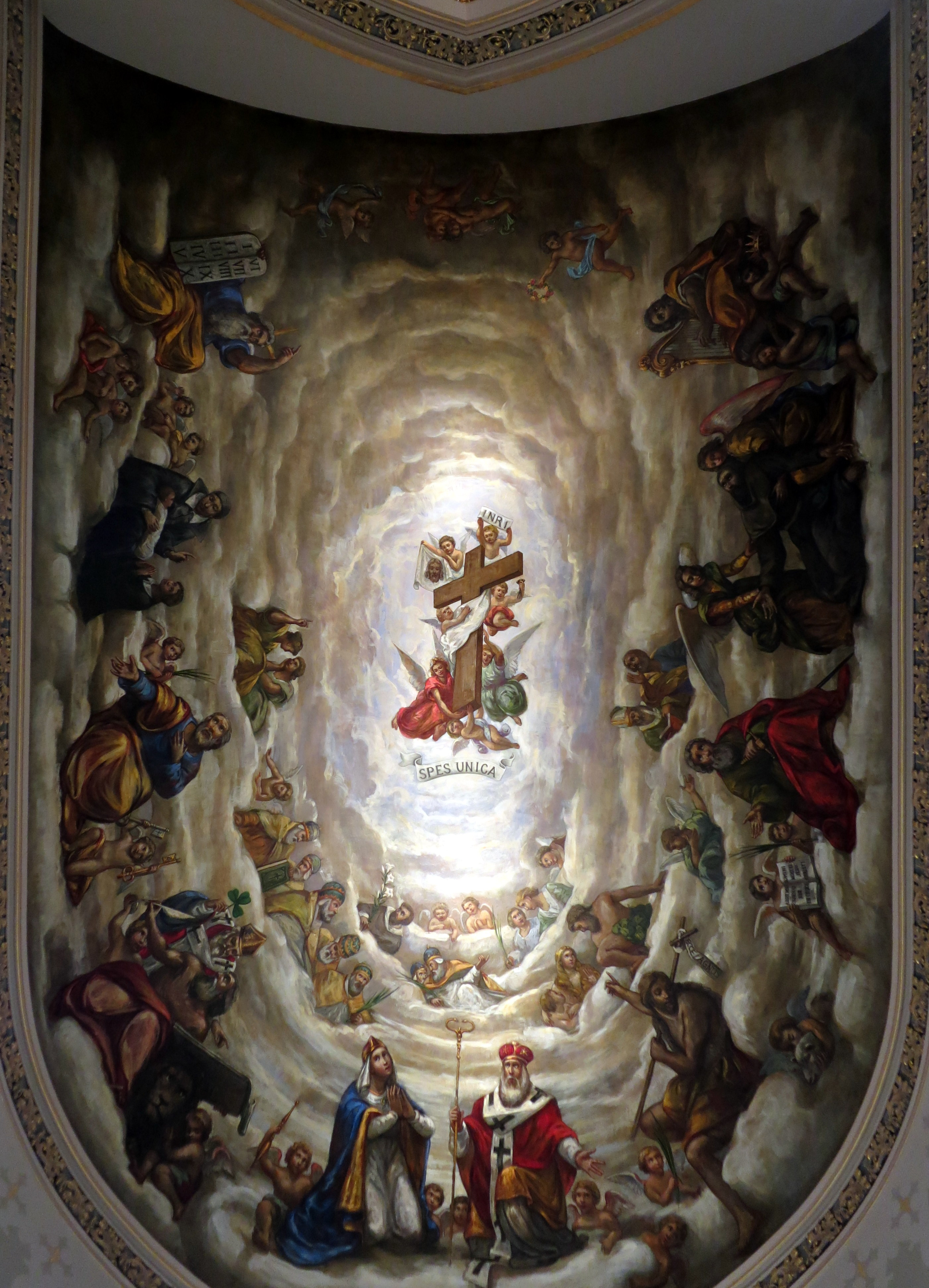
Exaltation of the Holy Cross

Between the late 1960s and early 1970s, the church was renovated with the intention of bringing it in line with the liturgical reform of the Second Vatican Council. The high altar was retained, but moved back and an ornate wooden freestanding altar was placed at the crossing. The choir stalls were removed from the presbytery and moved to the Lady Chapel and the stations of the Cross painted by Gregori were put in storage. In 1969, the altar rail were removed and the pulpit was substituted with one at a shorter height. These changes, in line with the direction of the council, were meant to remove barriers between the celebrant and the congregation.

The church again received a renovation 20 years later, executed by Conrad Schmitt Studios, during which some of the 1968 renovations were reverted, including the return of the Gregori stations of the Cross and a return of more ornate decoration. The conservation and restoration of the historic stained glass windows, created in Le Mans, France, was one of the studio's largest single projects, with 116 windows and over 1,200 panels of glass. On 17 January 1992, Pope John Paul II raised the Church of the Sacred Heart to the status of Minor basilica, which had been Sorin's desire since 1888. This designation is one factor in making it a popular destination for approximately 50,000 pilgrims and tourists who visit annually. From 1977 through 1997, Rev. Daniel R. Jenky, C.S.C., of the Diocese of Peoria, Illinois, served as rector of the basilica, before he became head of the religious community there and later Auxiliary Bishop and vicar general of the Diocese of Fort Wayne–South Bend and later Bishop of the Diocese of Peoria, Illinois. Under his tenure, the church was elevated to a basilica.

The basilica was the site of the funeral of many members of the community, including that of Theodore Hesburgh and Regis Philbin.

On 28 October 2021 Patriarch Bartholomew I of Constantinople visited the basilica where he delivered an address on environmental stewardship and received an honorary degree. The Patriarch was accompanied by Archbishop Elpidophoros of America and the official delegation also included Metropolitan Emmanuel of Chalcedon, Metropolitan Iosif of Proikonissos, Metropolitan Ioustinos of Nea Krini and Kalamaria and the basilica hosted a concert by the Archdiocesan Byzantine choir of the Greek Orthodox Diocese of America. The Patriarch was originally scheduled to deliver the commencement address at Notre Dame in 2020, but had to cancel due to COVID-19.

== Exterior ==
The exterior of the church is constructed of Notre Dame brick and features a bell tower with a spire and two lateral pinnacles. The bell tower is 218 feet tall, and topped by a 12 feet tall golden cross, making its total of 230 feet the tallest height on campus.

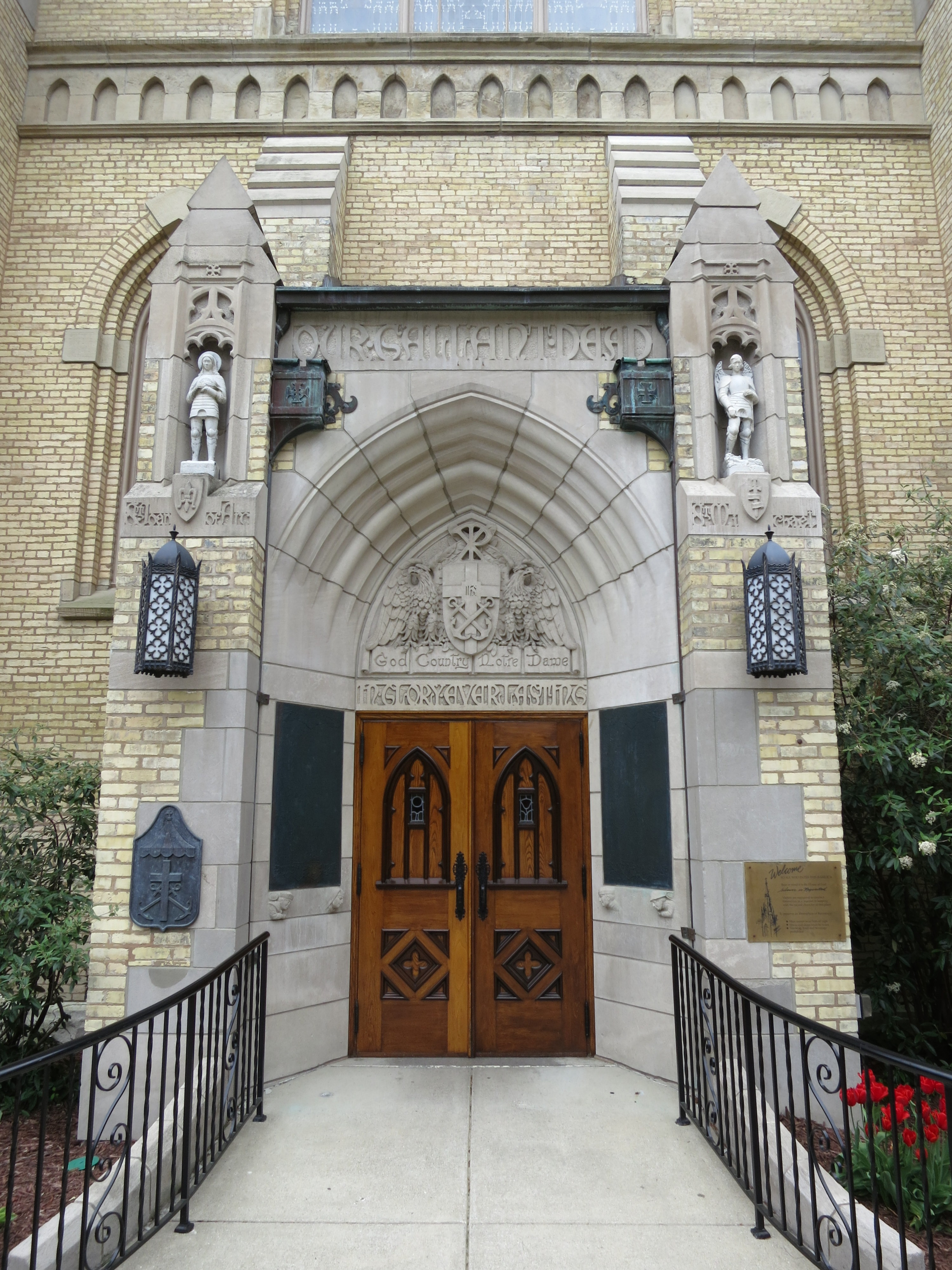
World War I memorial door

=== World War I Memorial Door ===
Plans for a memorial for Notre Dame's contributions to World War I began in 1919 shortly after the Armistice. Funds were collected by the Notre Dame Service Club and the local chapter of the Veterans of Foreign Wars. Notre Dame architects Francis Kervick and Vincent Fagan designed the work for a memorial door on the east transept of the basilica. The final design featured a door surmounted by a pointed arch and flanked by two buttresses, all in gothic style and yellow brick as the rest of the basilica. Initially, the memorial was meant to commemorate all 2,500 Notre Dame affiliates who fought in the war, including future presidents Rev. Matthew J. Walsh and Rev. Charles L. O'Donnell who had served as military chaplains. However, later revisions to the plan reduced it to two plaques flanking the door and commemorating the 46 Notre Dame students, alumni, and faculty who died in combat. The door itself is in oak with iron hinges, and contains two stained glass windows displaying the Tudor Rose and the Poppy. The stone lintel topping the door is inscribed with the words "In Glory Everlasting", while above the lintel a carved panel depicts two eagles supporting a shield with the old university seal (in use before 1930) and carrying in their claws a ribbon which the words "God, Country, Notre Dame". Above the door, the words "Our Gallant Dead" are inscribed in the stone facade. Statues of Joan of Arc and St. Michael by Rev. John J. Bednar, CSC, were added to the niches in the buttresses above the door in 1944, during the a campus beautification project. President Rev. Matthew J. Walsh dedicated the World War I Memorial Door on Memorial Day 30 May 1924 with a military mass.

== Interior ==
=== Altars ===
The basilica has three altars. The first is a high altar in Gothic Revival style, a graceful object in bronze built in shops of Froc-Robert in Paris for the Centennial Exposition in Philadelphia, during which it won a design award. After the Exposition, Father Sorin purchased the piece for the church. The tabernacle tower, which holds the reserved Blessed Sacrament, was inspired by Revelation 21:9, the vision of the new Jerusalem. Following the Second Vatican Council the gothic altar was moved to the apse, and a new altar was placed in the transept. This altar, called the Altar of Sacrifice, was made from old pews and choir stalls from the Lady Chapel. The third altar is a baroque altar in the Lady Chapel believed to come from the studios of Giovanni Bernini in Rome. Next to the gothic altar there are the Umbraculum and the Tintinnabulum, which are adorned with the insignia of the Pope and the coat of arms of the basilica, the dioceses, and the congregation. These two objects are symbols of the designation of minor basilica. The baptismal font, which is located at the entrance of the church, dates from 1871.

=== Frescoes ===
The frescoes adorning the walls and the ceilings of the nave were painted by Vatican painter and artist in residence Luigi Gregori. The ceilings are filled with a starry sky with angels, while the walls and transept are decorated with figures of saints. Each of the 12 bays of the vaulted veilinceuling is decorated with an angel, for a total of 96 painted angels. Gregori also painted the stations of the Cross that decorate the walls of the main nave. The neogothic style of the frescoes is similar to that of Santa Maria sopra Minerva, which was done by Bernardino Riccardi, Pietro Gagliardi, Tommaso Greggia, and Raffaele Casnedi in the mid-1800s. This style was inspired by Italian gothic decorations, such as the Basilica of Saint Francis of Assisi or the Scrovegni Chapel.

The saints depicted on the left side of the nave: Apollonia, Anthony, Bernard of Clairvaux, Dominic, Francis, Stanislaus Kostka, Aloysius Gonzaga, Rose of Lima, Agnes. On the right side of the nave: John the Baptist, John the Evangelist, Mary Magdalene, Saint Alexius, Benedict Joseph Labre, Thomas Aquinas, Saint Jerome, Saint Lucy, Saint Cecilia. On the left side of the choir the paintings of the Sacred Heart of Jesus, Gregory the Great, Ignatius of Loyola and on the right side of the choir: Immaculate Heart of Mary, Augustine of Hippo, Benedict of Nursia.

At the crossing, the ceiling is gold instead of blue, marking the sanctuary of the church, and is adorned with the figures of the four evangelists and Old testament prophets: Isaiah holding a scroll, David with a harp, Jeremiah with a scroll, and Moses with the tablet of the law, plus the evangelists Matthew (angel), John (eagle), Luke (ox), and Mark (lion) from the New Testament. The frescoes in the transept episodes of the life of Mary, such as the Nativity of Mary, Presentation of Mary, the Annunciation, Marriage of the Virgin, the Visitation, Nativity of Jesus, Mary Queen of Heaven. The fresco at the entrance of the Lady Chapel depicts the Coronation of the Virgin Mary as Queen of Heaven and was devised in 1874 and painted in 1887. Mary is crowned with a tiara of roses by Christ and God the Father under a dove symbolizing the Holy Spirit; the group is surrounded by figures from the Old and New Testaments holding scrolls and quills.

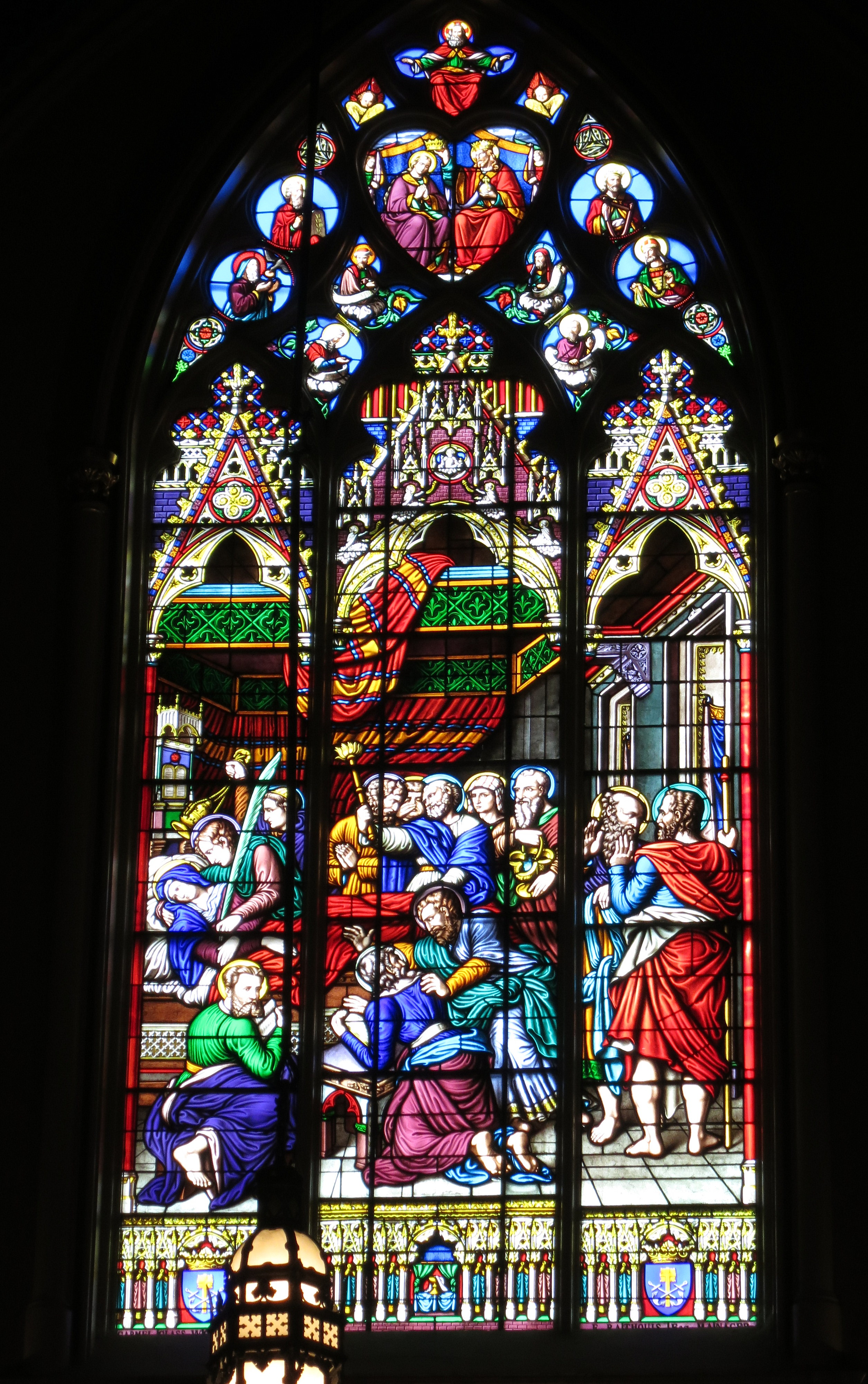
Dormition of Mary window

At the end of apse, on the left wall, there is a mural depicting apparition of Our Lady of Lourdes to Saint Bernadette in 1858 and on the right one a mural depicting the death of Saint Joseph. In the Lady Chapel, Gregori painted the luminous exaltation of the Cross, where the True Cross is exalted under the motto, Spes Unica. At the center of the fresco is the cross, supported by angels. A holy host carrying the instruments of Christ's passion surrounds the cross. Saints and prophets are arranged all around: St. Patrick is depicted behind St. Mark, holding a clover, and was added by Gregori after requests from the student body to honor its Irish heritage. In the foreground there are the figures of Saint Helena, the mother of the Roman Emperor Constantine, and Saint Macarius, the bishop of Jerusalem, who are said to have found the Cross in 325 AD.

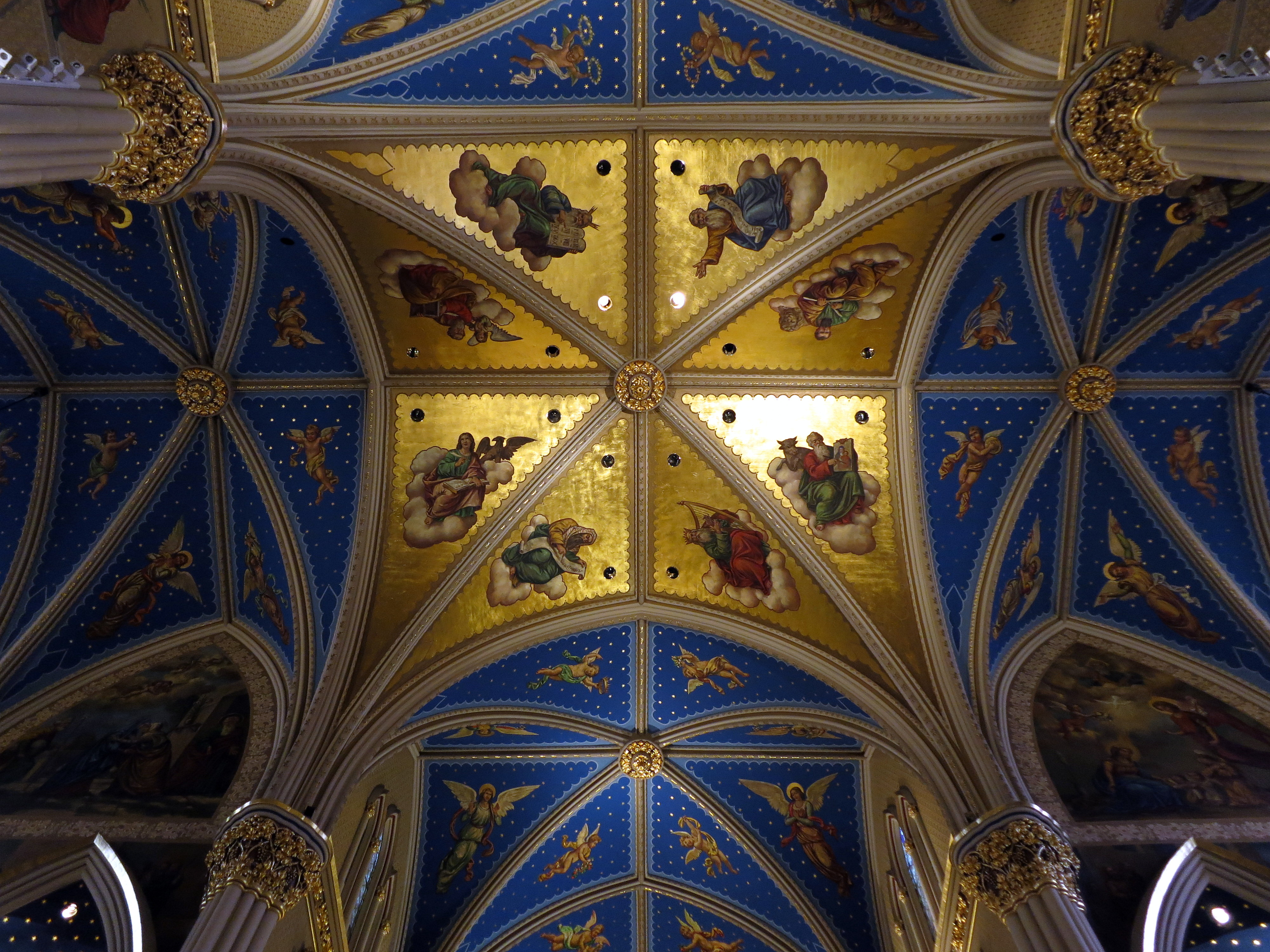
The transept

=== Windows ===
The 116 stained glass windows consist of more than 1,200 individual panels and were designed and made by the Carmel du Mans Glassworks, owned first the Carmelite nuns in Le Mans, France and then by Eugène Hucher and associates. The 44 large windows depict 114 life-size scenes and 106 smaller scenes. They were installed beginning in 1873, over a period of 15 years. The subjects of the windows were carefully chosen by Fr. Sorin with a pedagogic purpose, and the choice and positioning of the depicted figures is intentional and highly symbolic. Following Northern French custom, windows are read left to right, first the lower panel and then the upper.

The church's window's iconographic program was chosen carefully by Sorin. The large size of the order and the number of windows enabled such artistic and pedagogic program to be cohesive and planned out. The windows in each part of the church hosts a different theme: those of the narthex focus the mercy of God (featuring Purgatory and the Last Judgement), those of the nave feature saints, those of the transept regard the Church, and those in the sanctuary feature the most important saints of the Church. The chapels windows have a distinct and secondary message from that of the main body of the church, and each chapel focuses on a specific message or devotion.

Each of the 16 windows in the nave and transepts depicts 4 saints for a total of 64 figures, and each window has a theme (for example 4 saints who were kings or 4 who were nuns). The fourth windows of the nave represent the Great Fathers: the window on the east side of the nave depicts the Eastern Church fathers: Basil of Caesarea, Gregory Nazianzus, Athanasius of Alexandria, John Chrysostom; the window on the west side represent the Western Church fathers: Augustine, Saint Jerome, Ambrose, Gregory the Great.

The window on the north side of the west transept depicts the Sacred Heart of Jesus that inspired the basilica's name, while another on the south side shows Father Sorin presenting the building to God. The windows in the Lady Chapel depict stories for Christ's Life and each side chapel has its own theme that is depicted in its windows. The East and West transepts feature two large windows: the eastern window depicts the Pentecost, and its positioned towards the rising sun to symbolize rebirth, while the western transept depict the Dormition of Mary, and it is positioned towards the setting sun to symbolize the end of earthly life.

=== Side chapels ===
The basilica contains seven side chapels. From left to right:

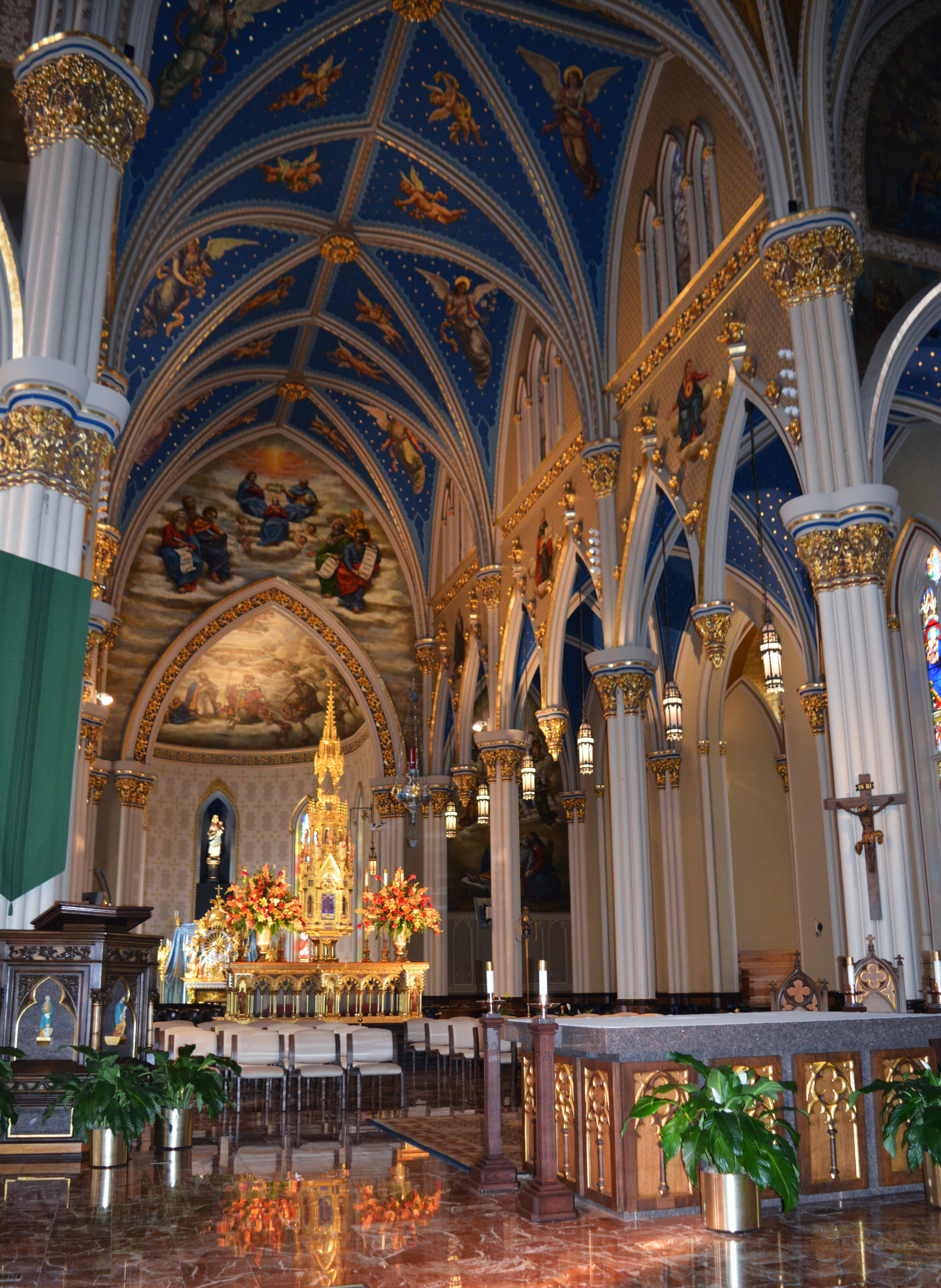
Altar and apse

- The Chapel of the Holy Cross with the Stations of the Cross contains the tomb of John Francis O’Hara, C.S.C., university president from 1934 to 1940 and the first member of the Congregation of Holy Cross named a cardinal. The chapel also holds the Return of the Prodigal Son statue by Ivan Meštrović. The windows depict six of the stations of the cross: Jesus takes up the cross, Jesus falls the first time, Jesus meets his afflicted mother, Jesus falls the second time, Veronica wipes the face of Jesus, Jesus falls the third time. The selection of these six among the fourteen stations is due to the chapel's dedication to the cross itself. The crucifixion is not present, but all three times Jesus falls are, as well as his encounters Simon of Cyrene, his mother, and Veronica.
- The Chapel of Our Lady of Victory contains a statue of Blessed Basil Moreau, C.S.C., founder of the Congregation of Holy Cross and beatified on 15 September 2007. The statue was sculpted by Robert Graham and contains a relic of Blessed Basil Moreau. It also hosts a copy of the 'New Icon of the Martyrs and Witnesses to Faith of the Twentieth Century', kept at San Bartolomeo all'Isola. Although the Notre-Dame-des-Victoires (Our Lady of Victories) church in Paris is a major place of devotion for Congregation of Holy Cross and Sorin had been there made pilgrimages, the original plan for the church did not include a chapel dedicated to Our Lady of Victories. However, Sorin was lost at sea in 1875 and he credited the providential rescue of the disabled and drifting ship to Our Lady of Victories and in September 1876, added this chapel dedication. The windows in the chapel depict stories connected to traditional stories of Mary's intercession in history: two panels depict the Battle of Lepanto, the Battle of Las Navas de Tolosa, Louis XIII and the Siege of La Rochelle (during which the king is seen with a scroll with the plans for the construction of Notre-Dame-des-Victoires), the Plan of Notre-Dame-des-Victoires (in which the king agrees to finance the construction of the church for the Discalced Augustinians), Fr. Charles-Éléonore Dufriche-Desgenettes establishing the Archconfraternity of the Most Holy and Immaculate Heart of Mary (which was founded and revitalized the Notre-Dame-des-Victoires parish, and of which Sorin was a member), and finally then Our Lady of Victories with the Child Jesus above the globe of universe (as depicted in a statue in Notre-Dame-des-Victoires in Paris).
- The Chapel of Holy Angels contains a framed modern painting of Our Lady of Guadalupe, painted by art professor Maria Tomasula in 2008. The stained glass windows depict the three major archangels from the Bible: Michael, Raphael, and Gabriel. They are shown in typical nineteenth century style, with feminine traits and incorporeal aspect, depicted on clouds and wearing fine garments and a circlet crown. The windows portray Saint Michael the Archangel defeating Satan (and featuring a depiction of Mont-Saint-Michel), the Inspiration for Mont-Saint-Michel (which depicts Michael appearing to Aubert of Avranches and commanding him to build the monastery), the liberation of Peter by Raphael, a guardian angel protecting a child, the Annunciation to Zechariah by Gabriel, and the Annunciation to Mary by Gabriel.
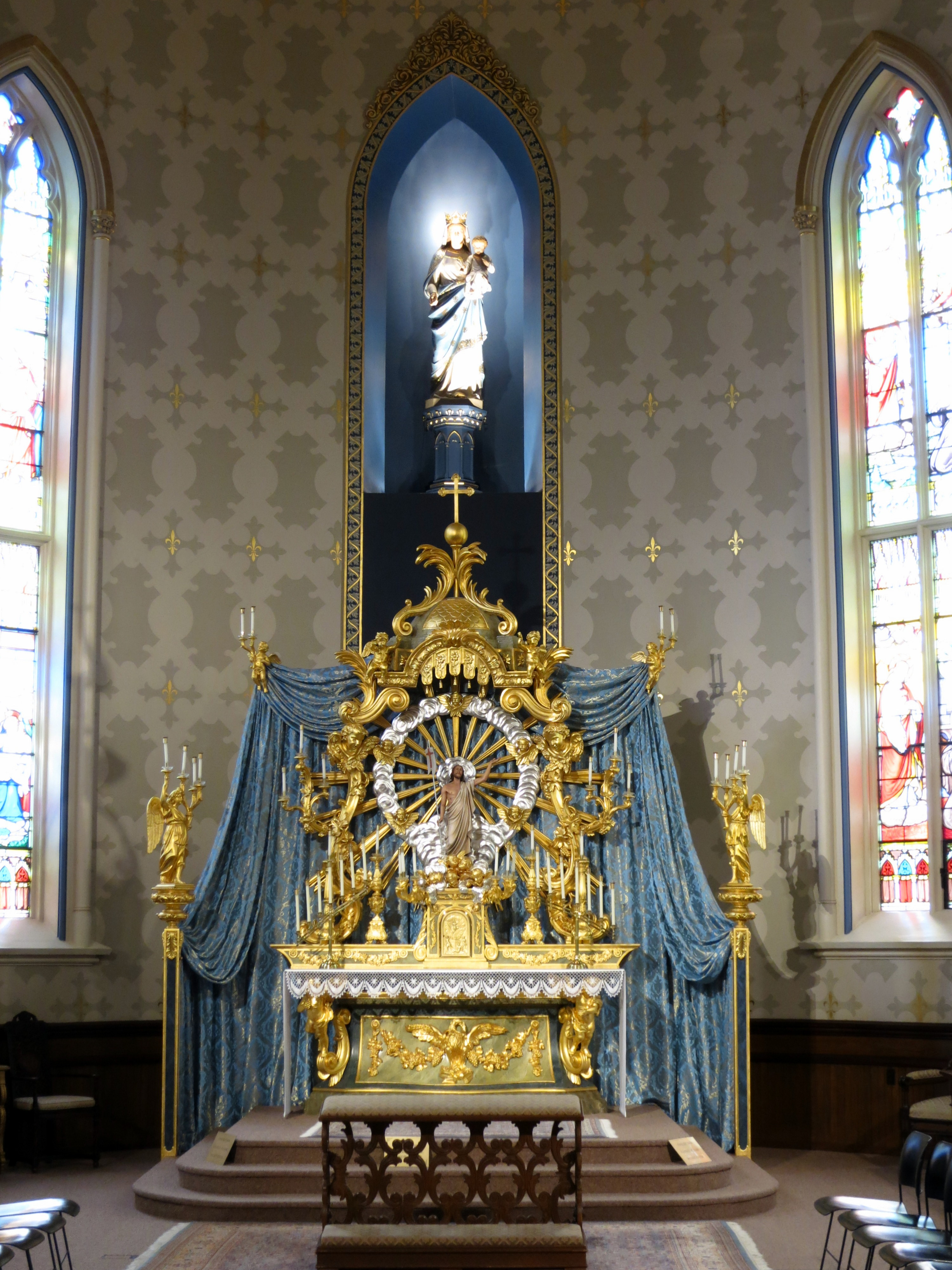
- Lady Chapel with Bernini Altar
  The center chapel behind the altar, the largest and most prominent, is the Lady Chapel. The Lady chapel was a common feature in medieval cathedrals and it was also inspired by the one present in St. Patrick's Cathedral in New York. The main feature of the chapel is the statue of Mary. Under it, is a baroque altar believed to come from the studios of Giovanni Bernini in Rome, where Fr. Sorin found it during one of his trips. The tabernacle doors contain a fragment of wood which tradition says to be from a table on which St. Peter celebrated Mass in Rome. The chapel, also known as Chapel of the Exaltation of the Holy Cross (depicted in the ceiling painted by Luigi Gregori) and Sacred Heart Chapel, was added on to the basilica in 1886 to help celebrate the 50th anniversary of Fr. Sorin's ordination in 1888. The windows depict stories from the life of Jesus and the biblical basis for the devotion to the Sacred Heart. The windows on the western side, read bottom to top, depict: The Birth of Jesus, The Last Supper, Gethsemane, The Crucifixion, The Pieta, The Risen Jesus and Doubting Thomas. The eastern windows depict the historical devotion to the Sacred Heart: Saint Margaret Mary Alacoque's great apparition (who was really important in the development of the devotion to the Sacred Heart), Saint Margaret Mary Alacoque's vision in the Filbert grove, the Consecration of the city of Marseille to the Sacred Heart (done by bishop Henri de Belsunce in response to the plague and an important step in the spread of the devotion), Pope Clement XIII proclaiming the devotion to the Sacred Heart in Poland in 1765, the homage of France to the Sacred Heart (a popular Catholic lithograph likely printed as part of the campaign for the construction of the Basilica of Sacré-Coeur, Paris), and finally founders of Sacred Heart devotion (which depicts Saints Bridget of Sweden, Teresa of Avila, Margaret Mary Alacoque, Bernard of Clairvaux, Francis de Sales, Augustine, Francis of Assisi, figures from history that contributed to the evolution of the devotion).
- The Reliquary Chapel houses relics of the Twelve Apostles, a piece of the True Cross, the burial of St. Severa, and numerous other objects of veneration. The wax figure is of St. Severa, a third century martyr. The cloth covered boxes at her head and feet contain her relics. Above the relic case is a copy of a portion of Raphael's fresco, Disputation of the Holy Sacrament. The chapel also hosts a copy of the Bronze statue of Saint Peter in Saint Peter's Basilica and a copy of the icon of Our Lady of Czestochova. The windows, installed in 1884, depict stories and miracles relating to the discovery or translation of relics. They depict the translation of the relics of Saint Martin of Tours, the finding of the relics of Saint Stephen, the translation of the Relics of Saint Nicholas from Myra to Bari, and King Louis IX carrying the Crown of thorns in Paris, The Return of Saint Eutropius's Relics from Bordeaux to Saintes in 1602 (although this window has also been interpreted by some scholars as the relics of Augustine), and the translation of Saint Eutropius's Relics in 1843.
- The Brother Andre Chapel, which houses a statue of Saint Andre Bessette, C.S.C., is dedicated to the first saint of the Congregation. He was canonized in 2010 for his work among the needy in Montreal. The chapel holds a statue of Saint André Bessette was designed by the Rev. Anthony Lauck, C.S.C. (1985). The windows depict episodes about the life and devotion to Mary. They depict the Nativity of Mary (in typical fifteenth-century style), the presentation of Mary, the Assumption (including a fifth century tradition that when Mary's sepulchre was opened it contained only flowers), the coronation of the Mary in Heaven, the proclamation of the Immaculate Conception (depicting Pope Pius IX proclaiming the dogma on 8 December 1854), and Mary as the Immaculate Conception with three angels.
- The Holy Family Chapel honors the life of St. Joseph and hosts Ivan Meštrović's masterpiece, the Pietà. The sculptor did the sketches for this magnificent pieta while he was a political prisoner of the Nazis. Mestrovic used his own likeness for Joseph of Arimathea. The work was exhibited at New York's Metropolitan Museum of Art before going on display in the church in 1955. A bronze copy of it is held at the Vatican Museums and a gesso copy to the Ivan Meštrović Gallery in Split. The windows of the chapel depict stories of the Holy Family and the Nativity, with stories centered around Saint Joseph taken from apocrypha. They depict:the Selection of Joseph as Mary's husband (from the Protoevangelium of James), the wedding of Joseph and Mary, the presentation of Jesus at the temple, Joseph Is warned by an angel to flee to Egypt, the Flight into Egypt, and the Death of Joseph.

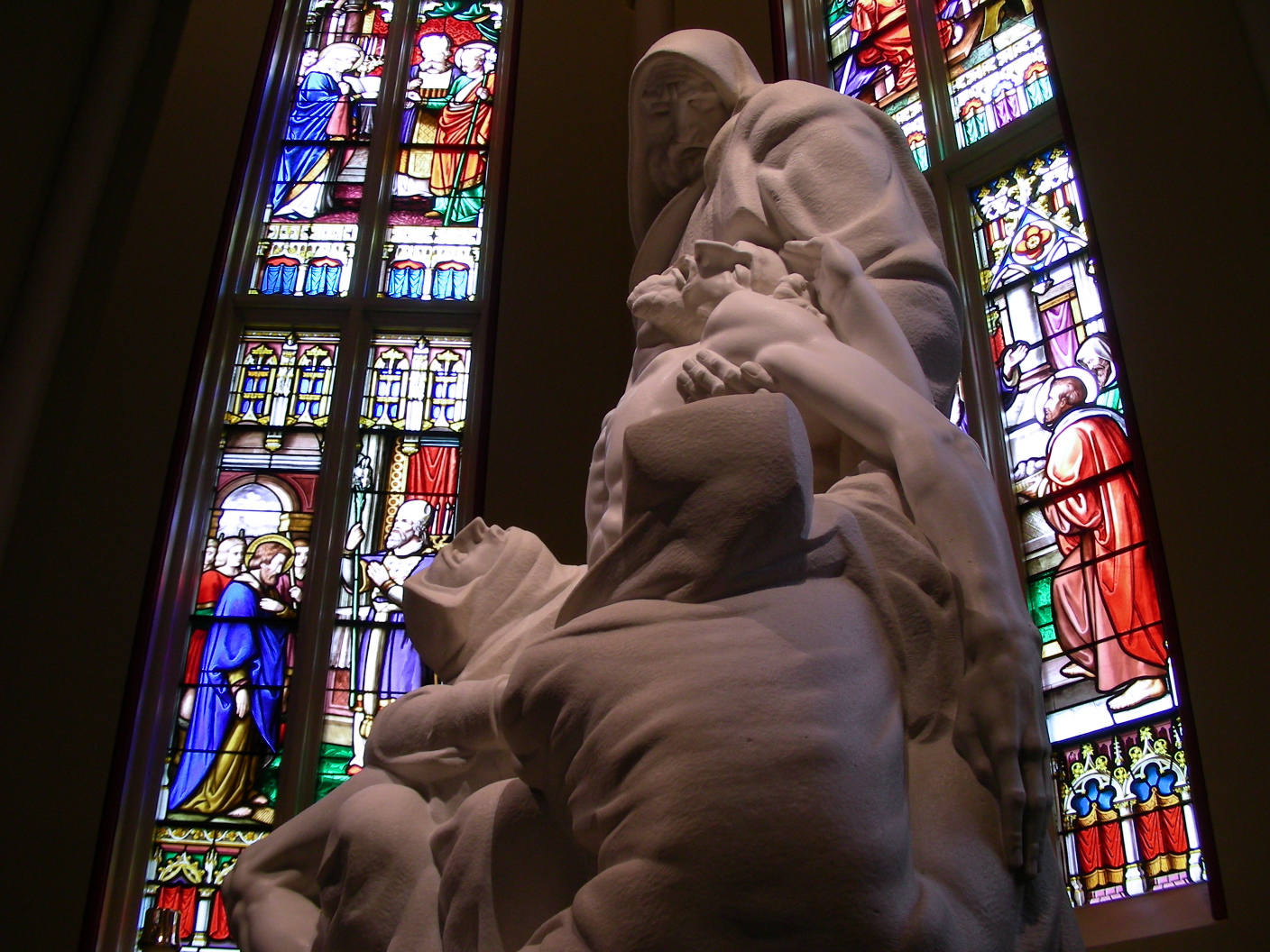
The Mestrovic Pietà in the Holy Family Chapel

=== Organ ===
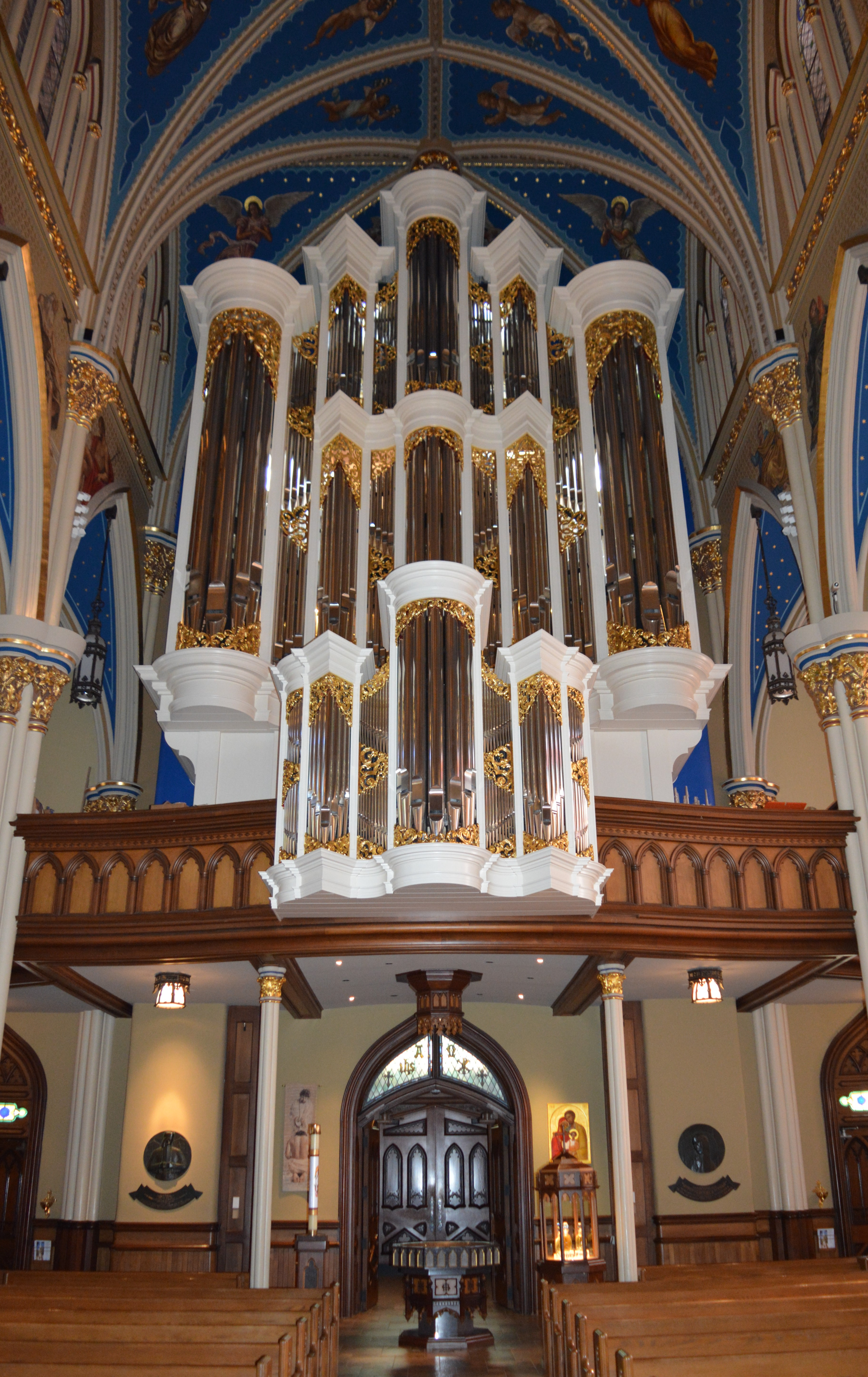
The Murdy family organ, the basilica's fifth organ, installed in 2016

The first Sacred Heart Church had a small reed organ in the 1850s. In 1865 Father Edward Sorin approved its replacement with a hand-pumped organ of 1,500 pipes. In 1875 Derrick and Felgemeker of Erie installed a 2,000 pipe organ inside the new and still incomplete Sacred Heart Church, which was eventually brought inside the completed church. In 1961 university president Rev. Theodore M. Hesburgh approved the addition 300 pipes to the organ. On 2 April 1978 a new organ was installed, donated by Marjorie O'Malley and built by the Holtkamp Organ Company of Cleveland, Ohio. It debuted at a dedication Mass celebrated by Hesburgh and a recital performed by Professor Michael Schneider of Cologne, Germany. Professor Craig Cramer joined Notre Dame's Department of Music in the fall of 1981 and inherited department chair Calvin Bower's charge to form the organ performance program.

In late 2006, Campus Ministry formed a committee to consider replacement of the basilica organ, headed by Dr. Gail Walton, the basilica's director of music since 1988. The committee performed a nationwide search, and in December 2006 it traveled to Columbus, Ohio, for the dedication of the new Paul Fritts organ in Saint Joseph Cathedral and decided to commission the new organ to Fritts, which became Fritt's second commission from Notre Dame. Previously, Paul Fritts and Company Organ Builders of Tacoma, Washington, had finished a 35-stop organ, also an O’Malley gift, designed in the northern German tradition, for the Reyes Organ and Choral Hall of the new DeBartolo Performing Arts Center in 2004. The Great Recession halted the project by taking a hit on the university endowment and benefactions, and the idea of replacing the basilica organ was tabled indefinitely. The project was further dealt a blow by the death of its foremost champion Gail Walton in February 2010. Yet, in the fall of 2010, the university approved a plan to commission a new organ for the basilica and started the search for a donor. As decided previously, organ maker Paul Fritts was commissioned for the project, and initial design work began in 2012 with work on the case in Tacoma beginning in 2013. The project called for a four-manual instrument with 70 stops, 5,164 pipes and a case inspired by Dutch masterpieces, and it was to become Fritts' magnum opus. The basilica closed in Christmas 2013 for the first phase of the organ project, which included a 44-day replacement of the church carpeting with 25,000 slate-colored porcelain tiles to improve acoustics. Meanwhile, a third Fritts commission, sponsored by Denis '67 and Susan McCusker, saw a studio organ designed in 2014 for the Walton Choir Rehearsal Hall in Coleman-Morse Center. On 28 December 2015 the Holtkamp organs played its last song, Silent Night, before its dismantling started the next morning. The organ pipes were donated to the reconstruction of a local parish, Saint Pius X in Granger, Indiana. In October 2015, Fritts loaned the church a temporary organ once the Holtkamp was removed. Work commenced on reinforcing the choir loft's concrete and adding steel support structures to the foundation. During the installation of the new organ, the basilica choirs sang next to the interim organ in the west transept.

The new organ, named after benefactors Wayne and Diana Murdy, was transported on a pair of tractor-trailers to the basilica on Sunday 31 July 2016. By end of August 2016, the façade and case was completed, and Fritts Company began the process of tuning and voicing the pipes and connecting the organ's key action, stop action, windworks and electrical wiring. The organ's first full performance test occurred during the annual Blue Mass honoring police, firefighters and emergency medical personnel on 6 October, with the tuning of last rank of pipes in the following weeks. It was finished on schedule for Christmas 2016. The new four-manual 70-stop Murdy Family Organ was designed and built by Paul Fritts & Company Organ Builders as its Opus 37. It has 4 keyboards, 70 stops and 5,164 pipes and stands 40 feet high and weighs more than 20 tons. Before installation, workers had to reinforce the loft to support the larger instrument. Bishop Daniel Jenky returned to campus to dedicate the instrument on 20 January 2017 which featured a recital by university professor and organist Craig Cramer.

=== Basilica museums ===
The basilica's museum, located behind the sacristy, displays artifacts from the history of the university and the Congregation of Holy Cross. Many items belonged to Fr. Edward Sorin, founder of the university. Items on display also include liturgical vessels and chalices, personal effects of Luigi Gregori, a cassock that belonged to Pope Paul VI, chalices and cassock of Pope Pius IX, and a six-foot- high processional cross presented to Notre Dame by Napoleon III and Empress Eugenie. Of particular significance, a papal tiara from the 1850s donated to Edward Sorin by Pope Pius IX. It is only one of two in existence outside the Vatican, and of these two the only traditional one, the other being the modernist tiara of Paul VI.

The basement holds the Bishop's Museum, which contains pontificalia of various American bishops, dating from the 19th century. It hosts ornate and embroidered vestments, mitres, shoes, caps, sandals, sashes, gloves, Cardinals' galeros, chalices, vestments embroidered by the daughter of the Empress of Austria. These include Rev. Alexis Granger's sick-call satchel, containing oils to anoint the sick; crosier and pectoral cross of the Reverend John Carroll (first Catholic bishop of the United States); a gold screen from the sanctuary of Santa Brigida through which St. Bridget of Sweden used to hear Mass; mitre of bishop Michael Francis Egan (first bishop of Philadelphia); crosier, mitre, and rabbi used by cardinal John McCloskey, first bishop of Albany; maniple from 1840 of the first bishop of California, Francisco García Diego y Moreno; cassock and books written by and about Archbishop Marcos G. McGrath, CSC.

== Liturgies ==
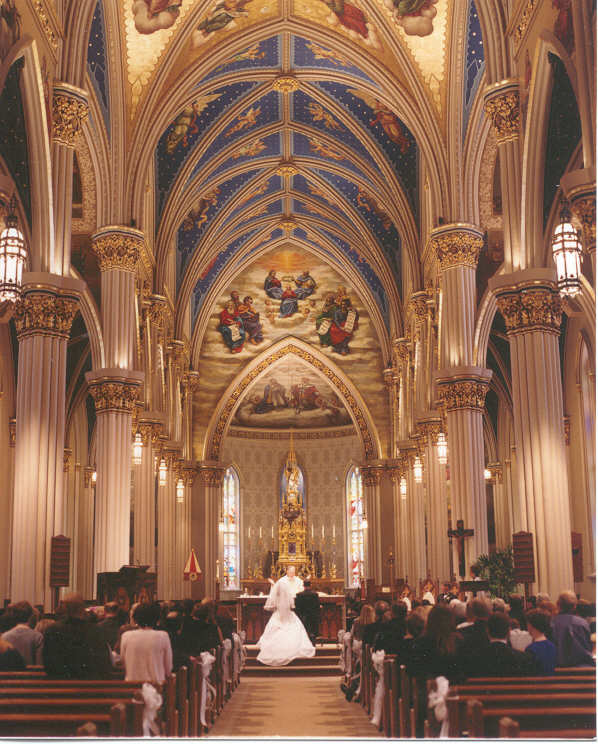
Basilica wedding

The basilica is the main liturgical center for the university community. Mass is held twice daily, while the university is in session, and once daily during breaks. Each weekend there are three Sunday masses celebrated for students, faculty, staff and community members. The basilica is a popular place for weddings of Notre Dame alumni, hosting several weddings each Saturday, whenever the Fighting Irish do not have a home football game. The basilica has also been the site of final professions and ordination masses for the Congregation of Holy Cross, as well as funerals for the religious community and for alumni.

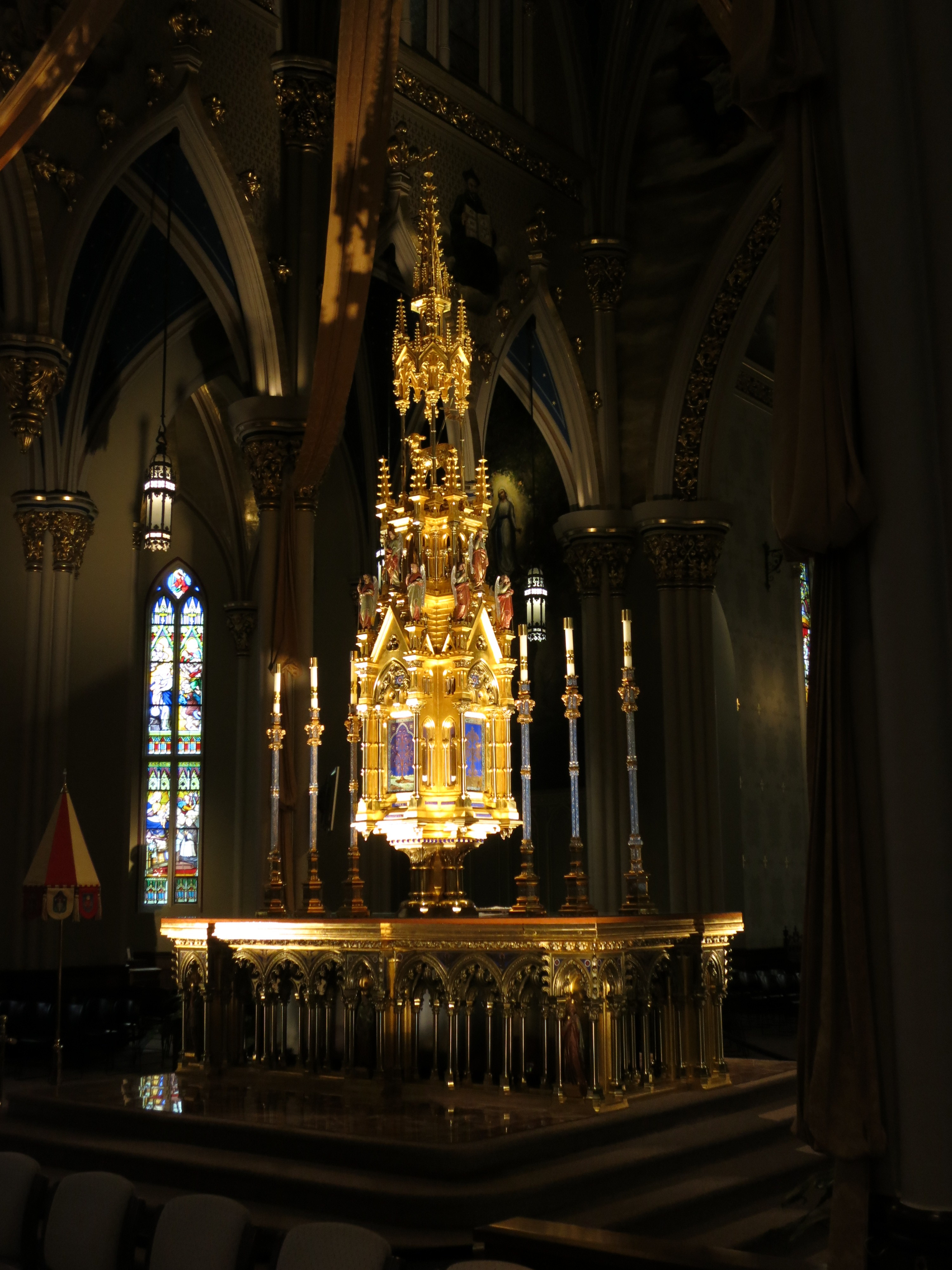
The high altar

Each Sunday evening the basilica holds Solemn Vespers and a special service during Advent, known as Lessons and Carols. Stations of the Cross is celebrated each Friday during the season of Lent. At other times throughout the year, the basilica hosts special liturgies of all kinds. The Paschal Triduum is celebrated every Easter and it lasts from Holy Thursday with the celebration of the Last Supper until Easter Sunday with Vespers. These celebrations are very popular among students and local inhabitants, and Easter liturgies are always very crowded. Located in the Crypt Church (basement level) of the basilica is Sacred Heart Parish. Two people are buried in the basilica: Cardinal John Francis O'Hara, who is buried in the Chapel of the Holy Cross, and Orestes Brownson, who is buried in the crypt.

=== Broadcasts ===
Since 2002, Sunday masses from the basilica have been broadcast nationwide. Special care is taken to ensure that broadcasting equipment captures the beauty of the mass without impacting the rite. Currently, the 10:00 A.M. mass is broadcast on CatholicTV, while the 11:45 A.M. mass is broadcast online at NDPrayerCast.org and through iTunes.

== Carillon ==
The original 23 bells were installed in 1856 and make-up the oldest carillon in North America. They were made in France, and each has a name related to Mary. The final bell, which is one of the grandest in the United States was blessed in 1888, during Father Sorin's Golden jubilee and it is named for St. Anthony of Padua, it is an immense non swinging bourdon, more than seven feet tall and weighing 15,400 pounds.

== Gallery ==
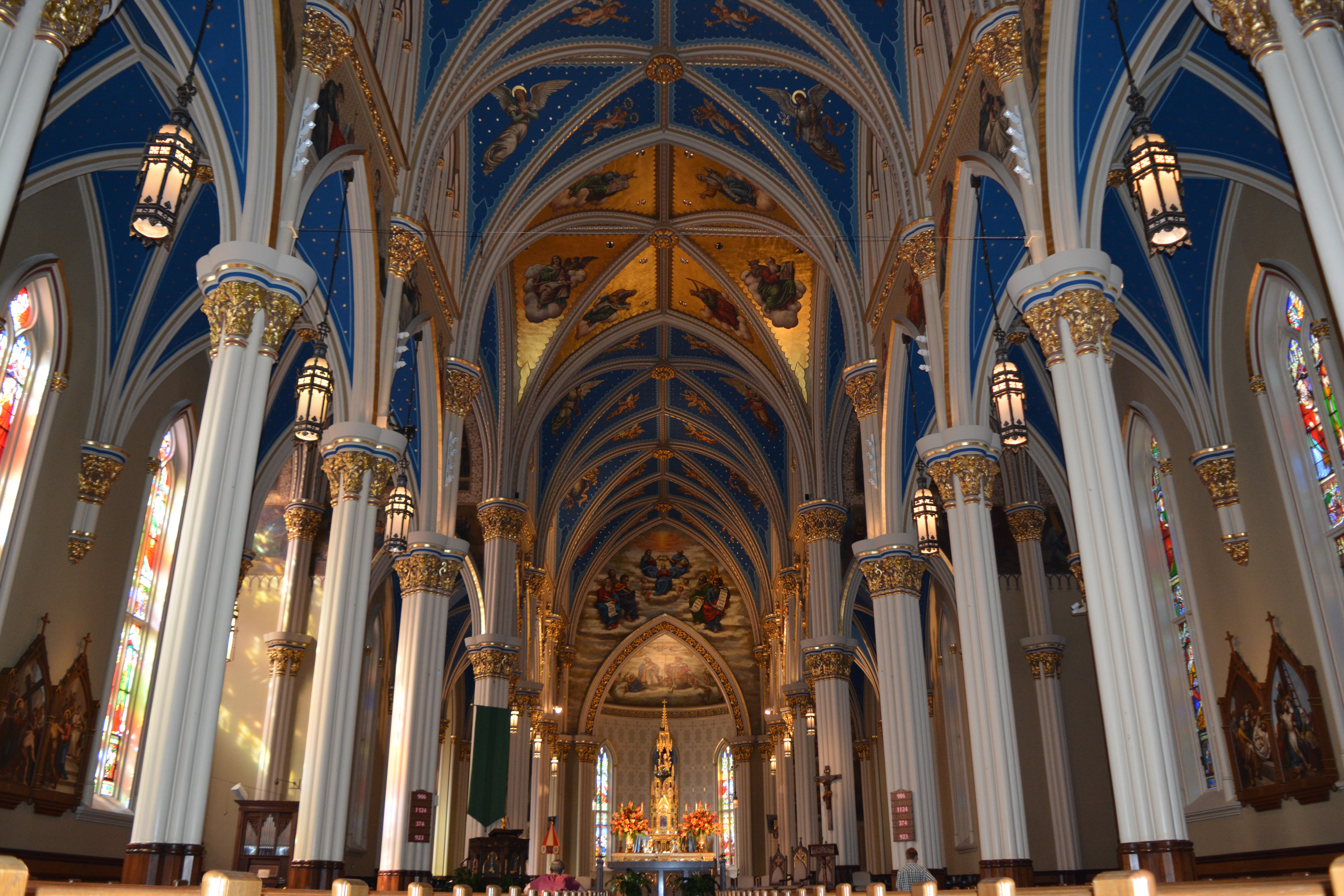
Nave

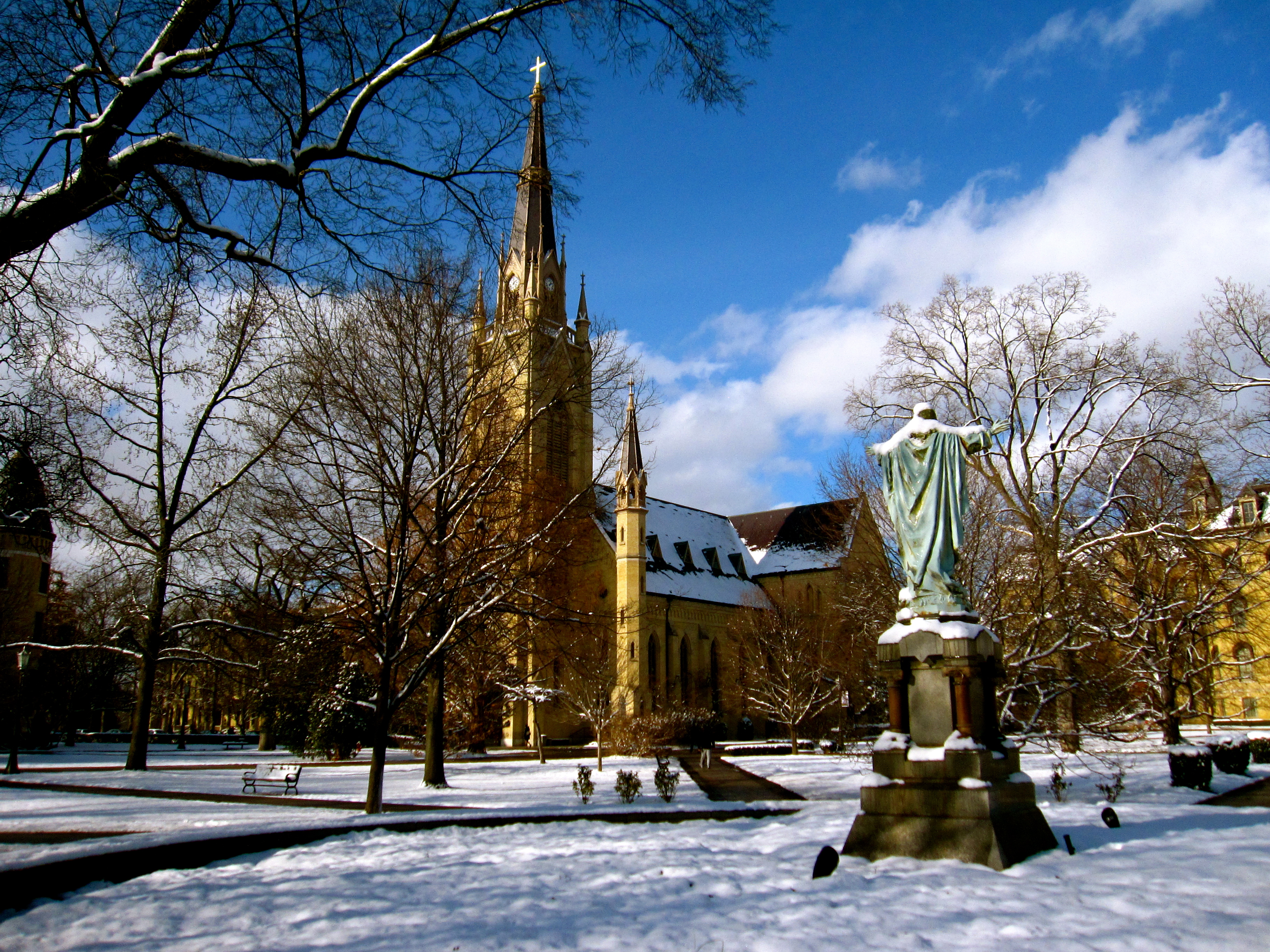
Basilica in the winter

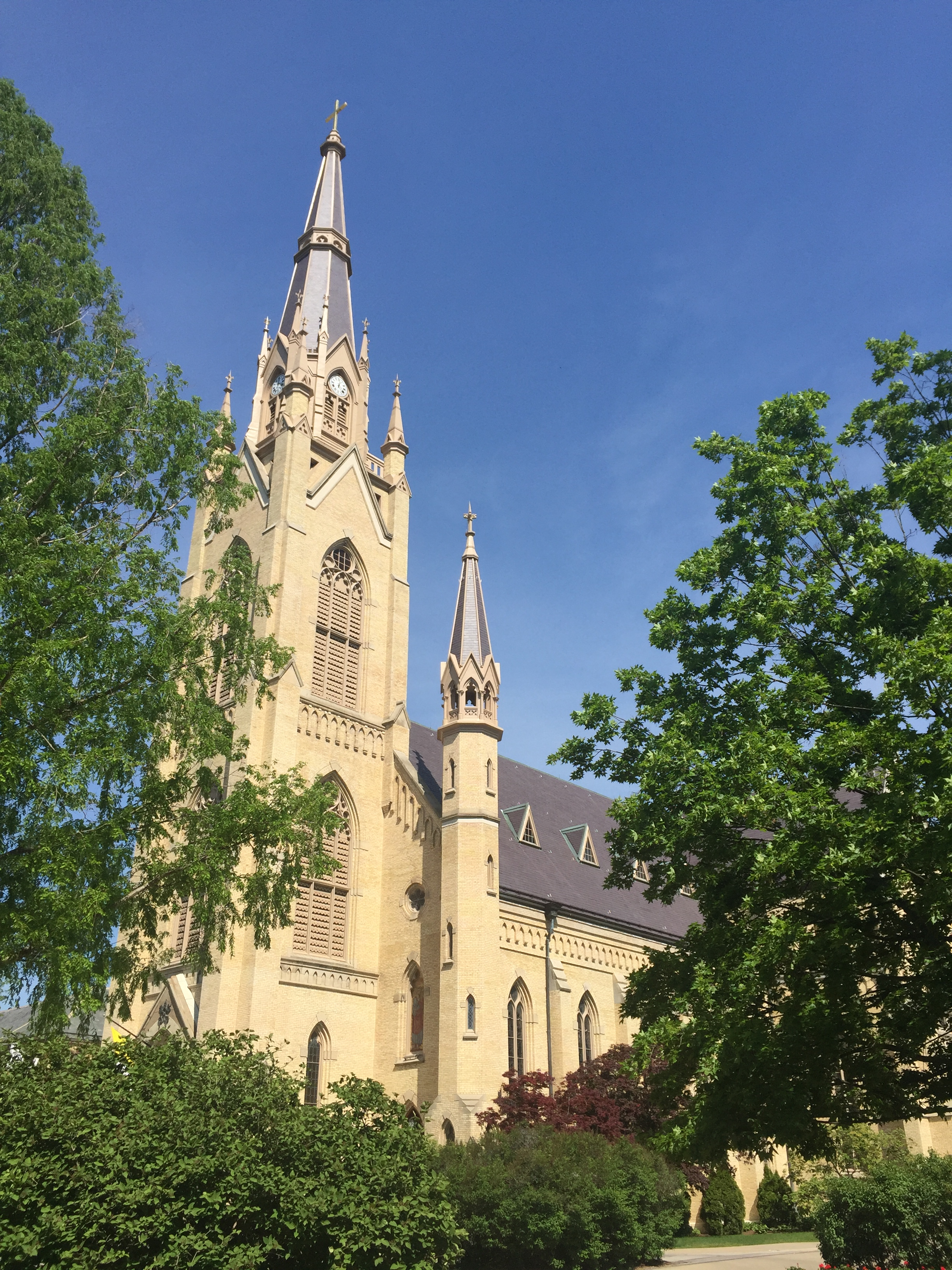
Basilica in the summer

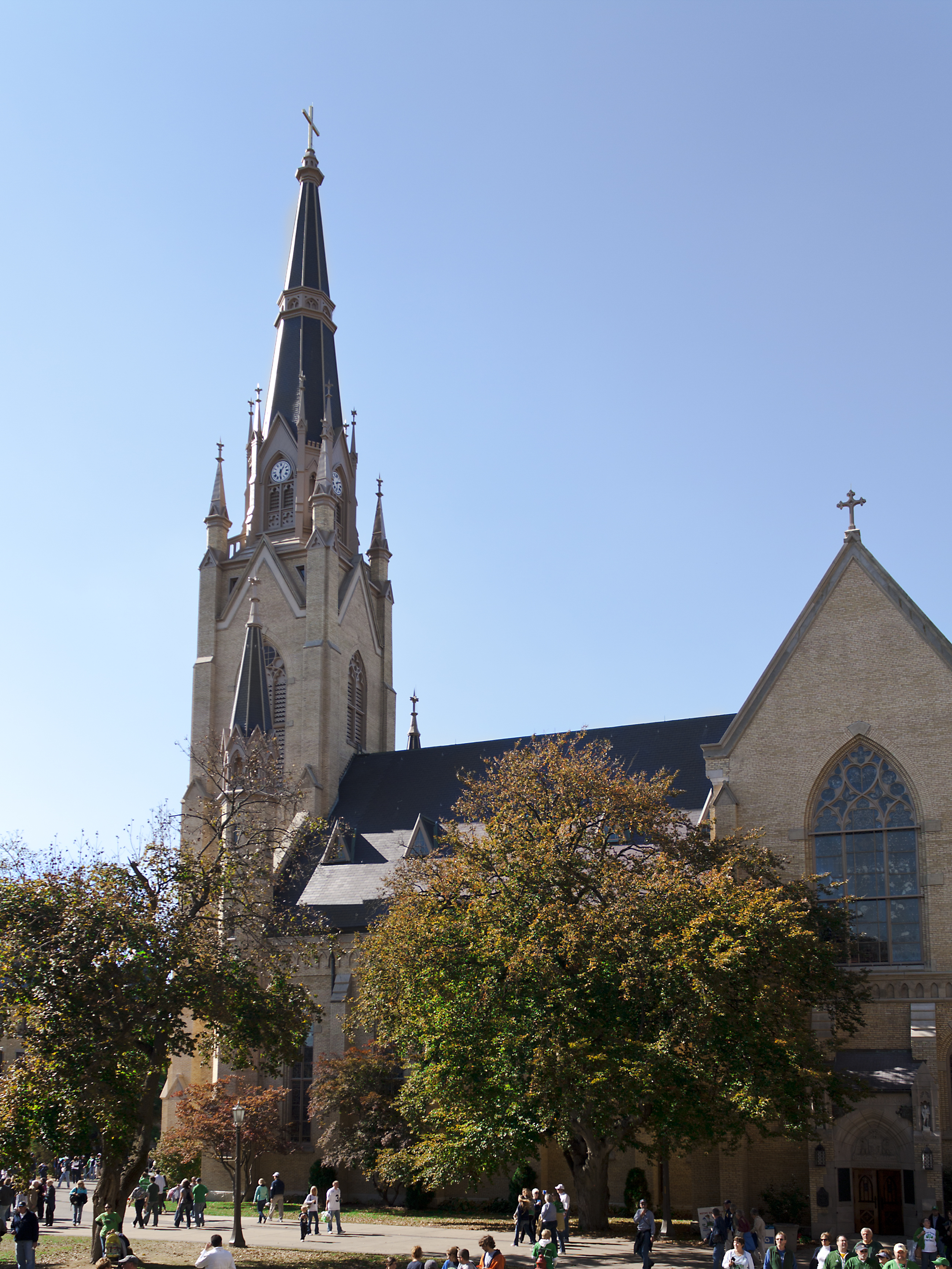
East façade

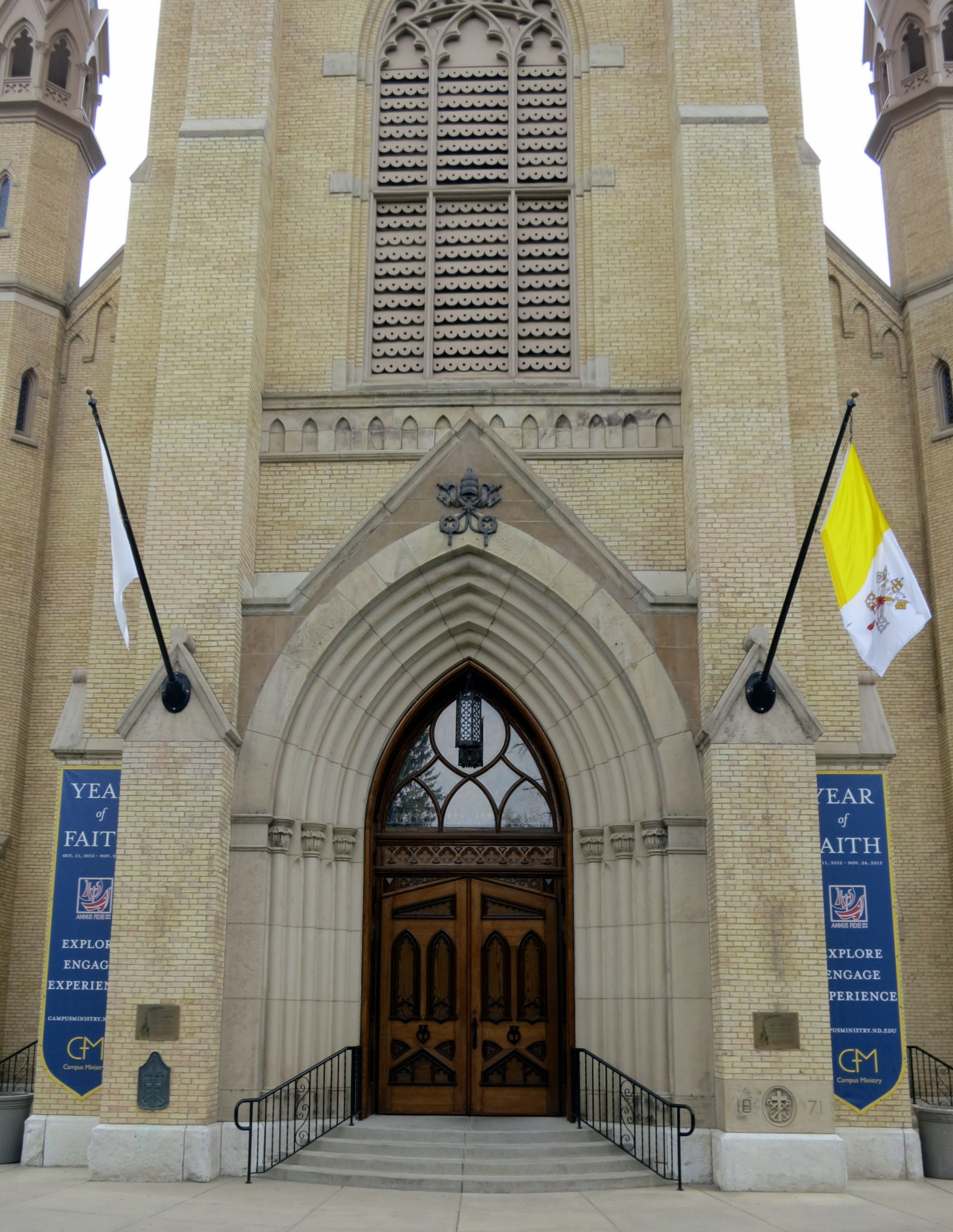
Main portal

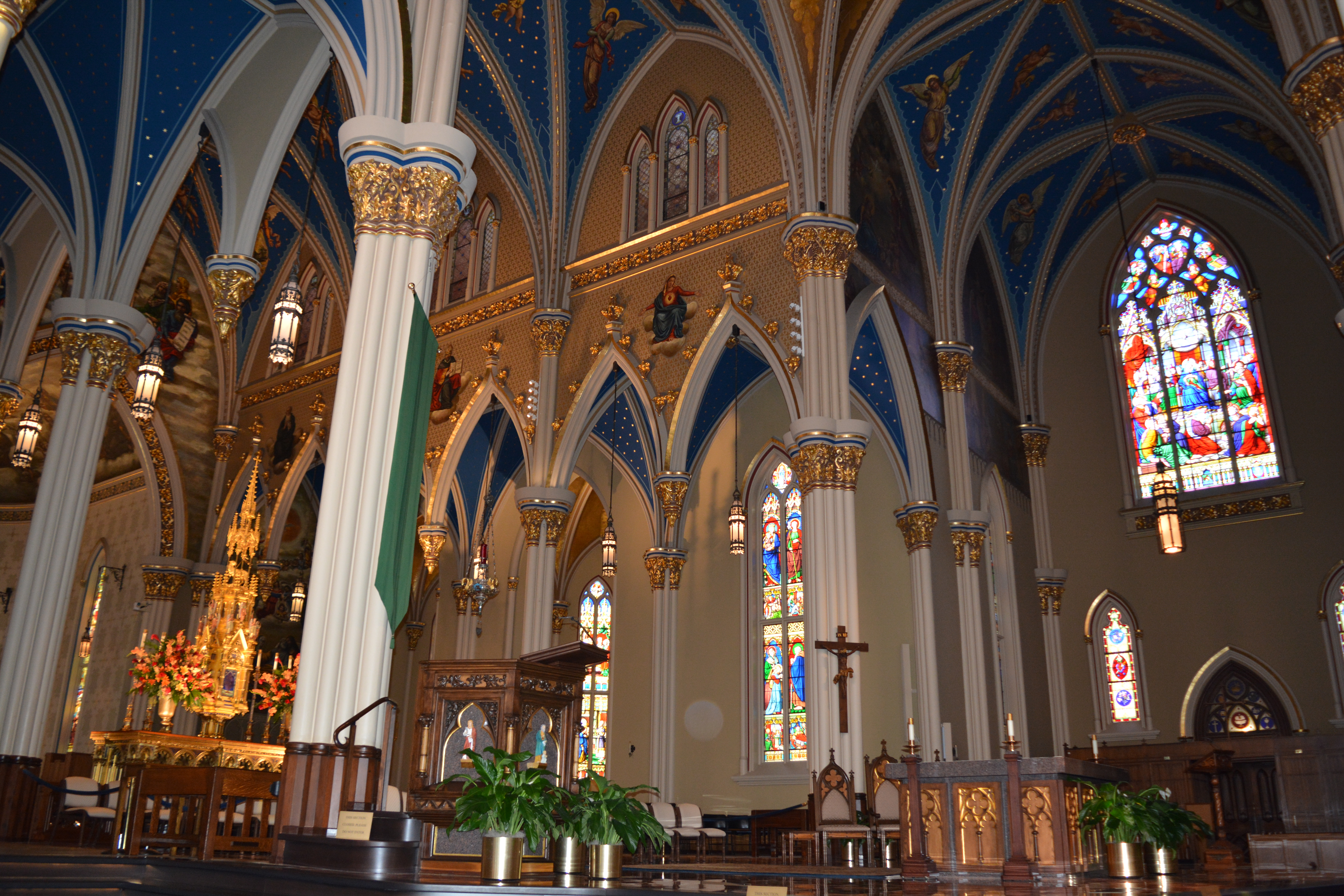
Pulpit and altar

== Bibliography ==
- Cavadini, Nancy (2020). Stories in light : a guide to the stained glass of the basilica at the University of Notre Dame. Cecilia Davis Cunningham. Notre Dame, Indiana. ISBN 0-268-10744-0. OCLC 1131869873.
- O'Meara, Thomas F (1991). The Basilica of the Sacred Heart at Notre Dame: a theological guide to the painting and windows. Notre Dame, Ind.: T.F. O'Meara. OCLC 31135009.
- Schlereth, Thomas J (1991). A spire of faith: the University of Notre Dame's Sacred Heart Church. Notre Dame, Ind.: Notre Dame Alumni Association. OCLC 25938004.
