= Lido, Belgrade =

Neighborhood of Belgrade, Serbia

Coordinates: 44°50′22″N 20°25′29″E

Lido (Serbian Cyrillic: Лидо) is a non-residential urban neighborhood of Belgrade, the capital of Serbia. It is located in Belgrade's municipality of Zemun.

== Location ==
Lido is located on the northern tip of the Great War Island, on the Danube. It is actually a small, pointed sandy beach without permanent residents, which covers just small fragment of the island, as the entire Great War Island is protected by the law and urbanization is not allowed.

== Characteristics ==
The Zemun's residents used the area as a beach already before World War I. After the war, the beach was arranged for the first time. During the Interbellum, the beach "with its appearance and neatness was on par with similar beaches in Austria".

It was named after the Lido in Venice and originally developed as a wild beach, as an alternative to the much popular and official beach and park of Ada Ciganlija. Despite being very popular among the inhabitants of Zemun, it never managed to come close to Ada Ciganlija's popularity. The beach is small, unattended and without almost any accommodations, except for several restaurants. It was accessible only by boats until the early 2000s when a pontoon bridge was laid every summer by the Yugoslav army. The organization of "Eho festival" on the island in early 2003 went disastrously because of the bad weather and the financial malversations of the organizers.

Already neglected Lido suffered the worst fate in 2006, during the disastrous floods. What little of infrastructure existed there was all washed away by the Danube. The beach was not returned to its previous state, pontoon bridge was not laid that year and only two boats remained to transport people to the island. As a result of all that, instead of 10,000 people which daily visited Lido in previous years, in 2006 there were no more than 200–300. For the summer 2007 Lido was finally prepared for visitors and the bridge is laid again. Further improvements preceded the 2008 season. Bank area and the green belt surrounding Lido were cleaned and arranged and for the first time lifeguard service was set on the beach, so as a police patrol and a boat ambulance. Instead of bridge, only boat access was organised, from both Zemun and Dorćol (central Belgrade) sides.

During the low water level in the Danube in the summer of 2022, the beach temporarily grew by the August for additional 300 metres (980 ft) of exposed riverbed. The drought also affected the depth of the water at the beach, as the only knee-deep water stretched for over 200 metres (660 ft) into the river's stream.

== Pontoon bridge ==
Military placed the pontoon bridge for the first time in 1966. The pontoon was relocated from Ada Ciganlija where it was placed in 1961, after the permanent embankment was finished. The bridge was later removed. Since 1996, the pontoon has been placed each summer during the summer season, connecting the beach and the neighborhood of Zemunski Kej, across an arm of the Danube. As the beach was almost wiped out during the disastrous 2006 European floods, the bridge wasn't laid from 2006 to 2008.

In general, the bridge is laid from July to September. It is 375 m (1,230 ft) long and placed by the engineering units of the Serbian Armed Forces. Placing of the bridge routinely causes protests from the boatmen, either those who work as a ferrymen when there is no bridge, or those who are simply blocked in the Danube's arm between the island and the bank across it.

== Gallery ==
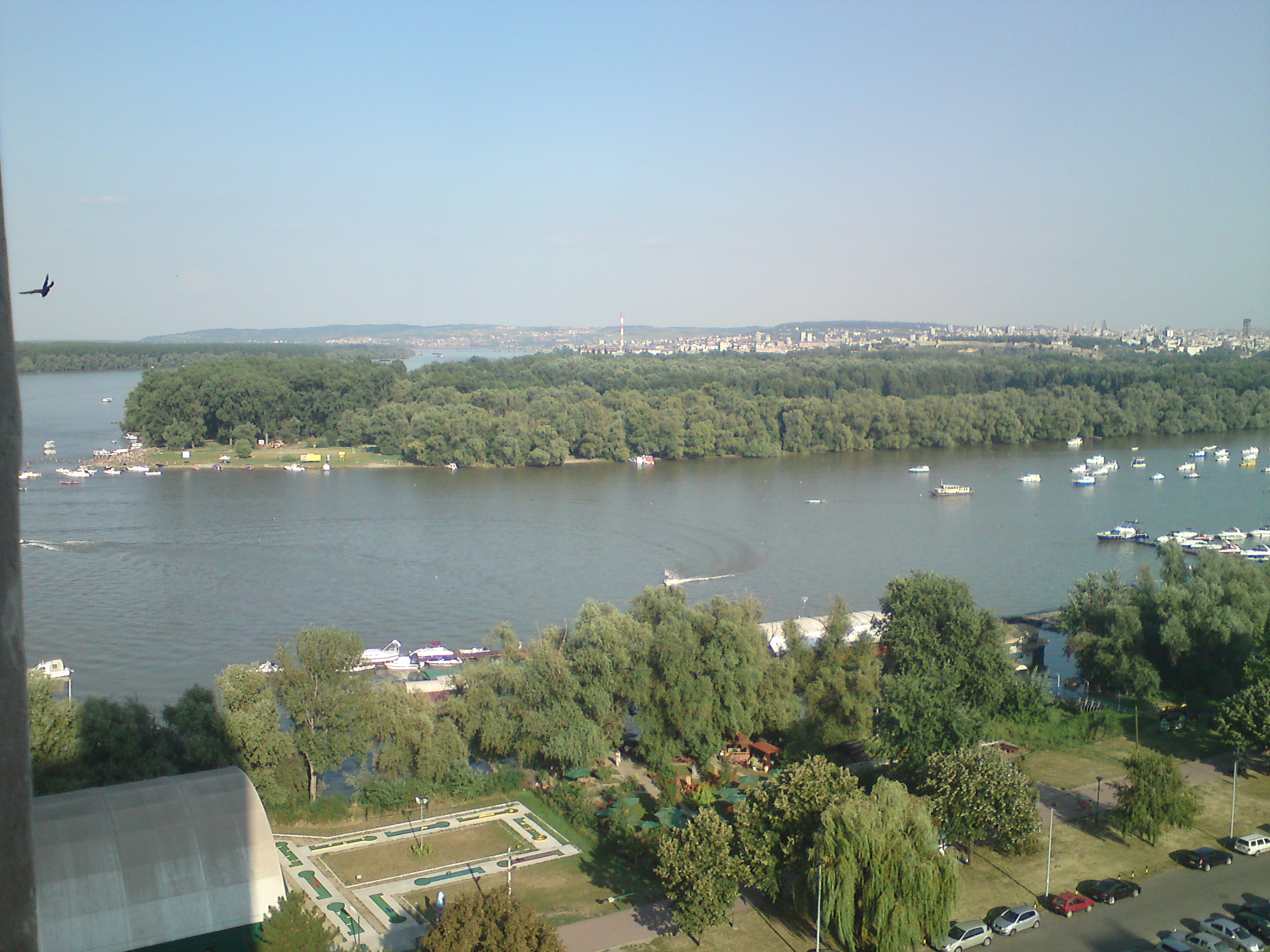
Birds view of Veliko ratno ostrvo (Lido to far left and Belgrade in background) from Zemun.

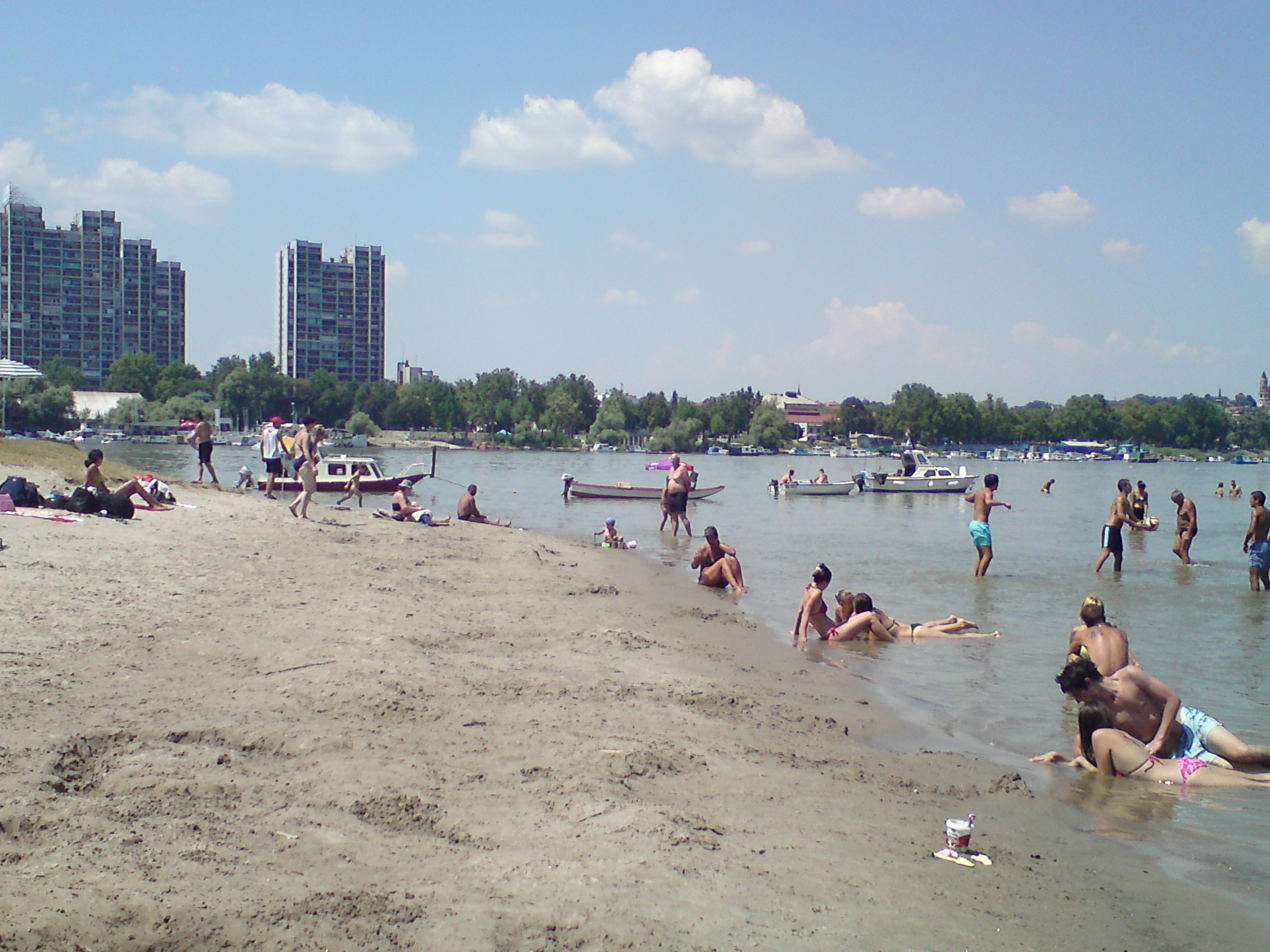
Lido beach on Veliko ratno ostrvo on Danube, Belgrade, Serbia.

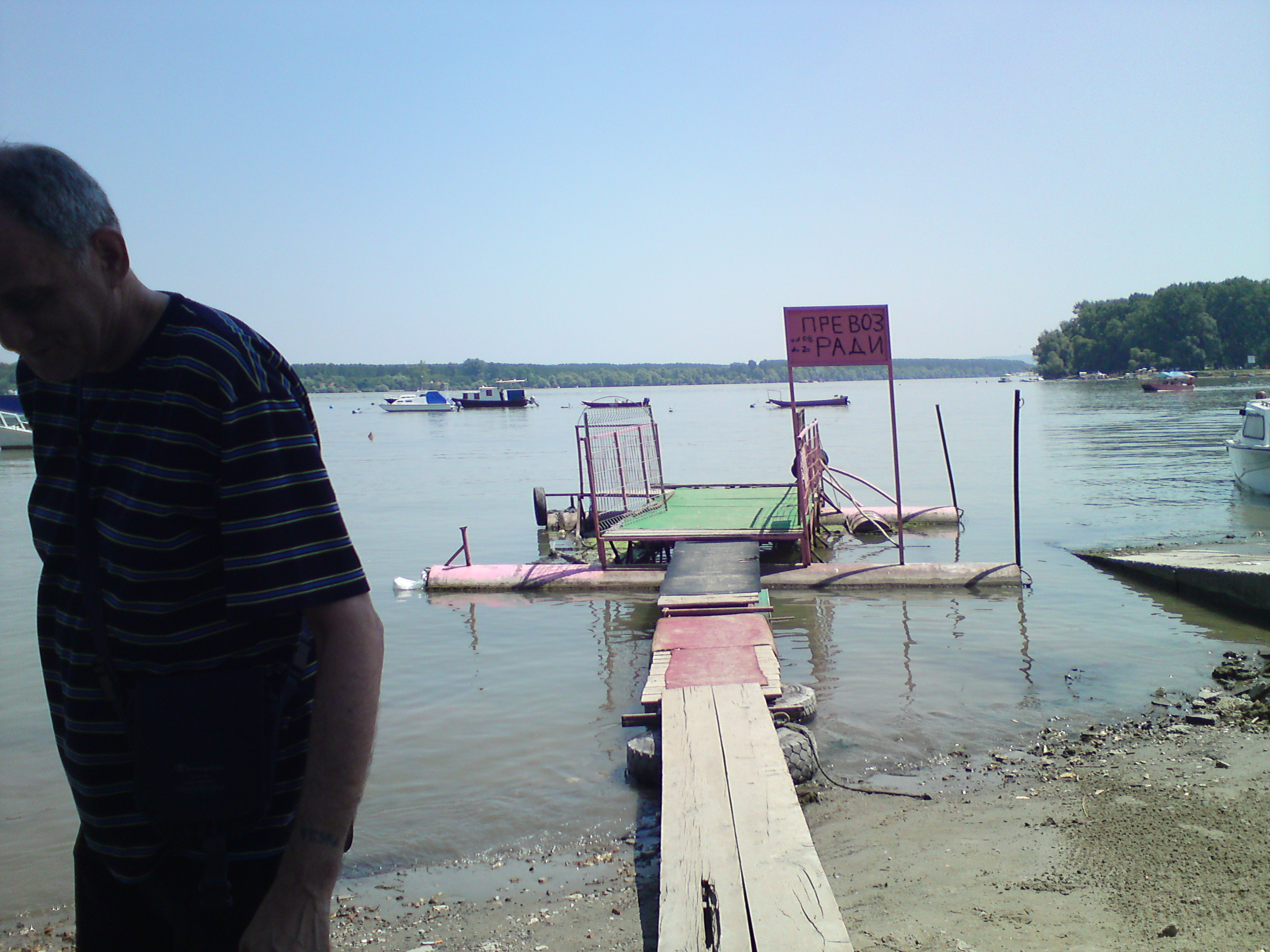
Landing point for ferry crossing on Zemun side.
