= Zemunski Kej =

Zemunski Kej Земунски Кеј
- Urban neighbourhood
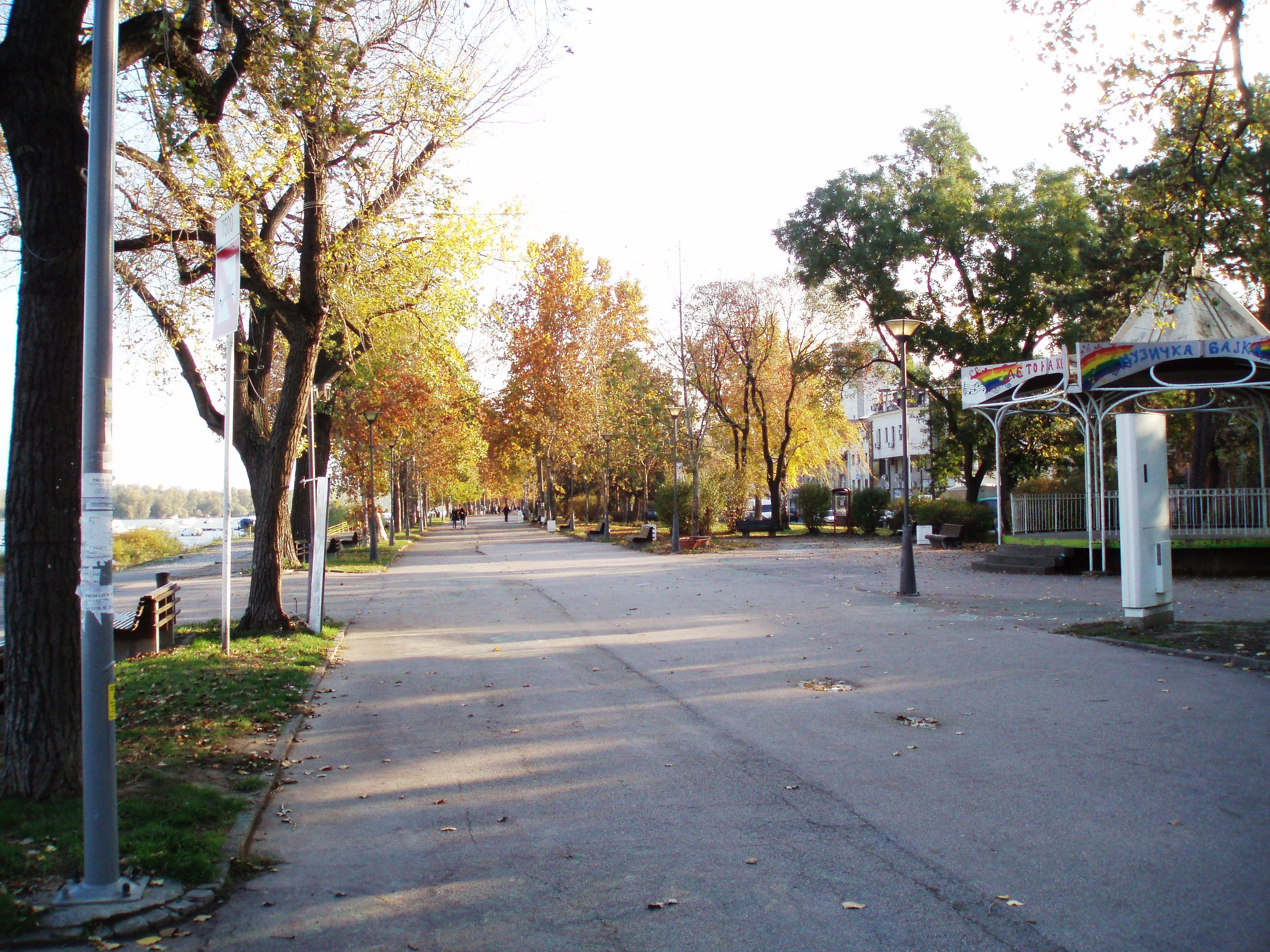
- Zemunski Kej
- Etymology: Zemun Quay
- Location within Belgrade
- Coordinates: 44°50′36″N 20°25′02″E
- Country: Serbia
- Region: Belgrade
- Municipality: Zemun
- Local community: Zemunski Kej

Population (2002)
  - Total: 12,112
- Time zone: UTC+1 (CET)
  - Summer (DST): UTC+2 (CEST)
- Area code: +381(0)11
- Car plates: BG

Zemunski Kej (Serbian Cyrillic: Земунски Кеј) is an urban neighborhood of Belgrade, the capital of Serbia. It is located in Belgrade's municipality of Zemun.

== Location ==
Zemunski Kej, as its name suggests (Zemun's quay), is located alongside the right bank of the Danube. The promenade itself (officially named Kej Oslobođenja, Quay of Liberation) begins below the Gardoš hill, at the square of Veliki Trg and after 2.5 km (1.6 mi) continues into the municipality of New Belgrade. On the west it borders the neighborhoods of Donji Grad and Retenzija and on the south the neighborhood of Ušće in New Belgrade. To the east, in the Danube, is the Great War Island and its beach Lido.

== Quay ==
=== Promenade ===
Modern area of Zemun's Donji Grad was regularly flooded by the Danube. After massive 1876 floods, local authorities began the construction of the stony levee along the Danube's bank. Levee, a kilometer long, was finished in 1889. When hydroelectrical plant Đerdap I began to fill its reservoir in the late 1960s, due to the backwater of the Danube, underground waters in Zemun and New Belegrade got elevated and the cellars of the buildings got flooded. To prevent this, the high embankment with the promenade was built in 1967 so the Danube rarely flooded the quay (most notably in 1981). On the other hand, a historical minimum of the water level was recorded in November 1983.

In September 2007 reconstruction of the quay's 350 m (1,150 ft) long section began including further elevation of the embankment, widening of the pedestrian path and construction another one on separate level, completion of the cycling path, etc. Works, which were the first works on any embankments in Belgrade since 1990, were finished in 2008. Works continued in 2010–2011. After being elevated by one meter in 1967 to the point 70.5 m (231 ft), embankment was further raised to 73.5 m (241 ft) in 2010 and 77 m (253 ft) in 2011, thus preventing any further flooding as the recorded water level was never higher than that. Over 450 m (1,480 ft) of the embankment was first solidified with 17,000 m3 of different materials, then consolidated with beams and further elevated with 20,000 m3 of sand, gravel and stone.

In October 2020, plans for massive reconstruction and extension of the quay were announced for 2021. The plans include extension to the north, upstream the Danube, to the Pupin Bridge. Deadline is set to 2022. The area in question is 2.7 kilometres (1.7 mi) long and covers 22.2 hectares (55 acres). The architectural design competition was organized in October 2021, and three designs were selected by February 2022. The cliff-like bank in this section is prone to erosion, as it is the ending section of the Zemun Loess Plateau. It is located between the Danube and the Gornji Grad's sub-neighborhood of Pregrevica. In order to lift the banks height, and to stop further erosion of the bank, the embankment, with the adjoining promenade and pathways, will be built as the wide, step-like plateaus. Plans also include a marina and the connection with the pedestrian and bicycle paths on the Pupin Bridge.

=== Barges ===
In the early 1970s, architect Branislav Jovin designed the plateau and the quay in front of the Hotel Jugoslavija. Generally considered beautiful and elegant, the project allows the cascade descent from the hotel to the Danube's bank. Early 1990s saw the expansion of the splavovi (singular, splav), barge-clubs on the rivers. They originated along the banks of the Sava and expanded in the nearby Ušće neighborhood. After 1996, they spread along the quay in front of the hotel.

The location was favorable as it was one of the rare point at the time, where there was enough parking space and the quay was arranged and concreted, while many other parts of the banks were the barges were located were still muddy and inaccessible. In the 1996–2000 period, the splavovi were swiftly anchored in front of the hotel and in such numbers, that they became so close to each other that guests from one splav were able to talk to the guests from another one. In this period, barges at Hotel Jugoslavija became one of the most popular hangouts, as the barges became one of the focal points of the vibrant Belgrade's nightlife, but were also connected with criminals and numerous incidents. The entire section of the bank in front of the hotel has since then been colloquially known as "Chez Juga" (Kod Juge), after the shortened name of the hotel.

The majority of the barges placed in the last part of the 1990s are still operational, even under the same names, but are being replaced with much larger and modernized versions, unlike the other locations where splavovi appeared and disappeared, or changed names.

=== Pier ===
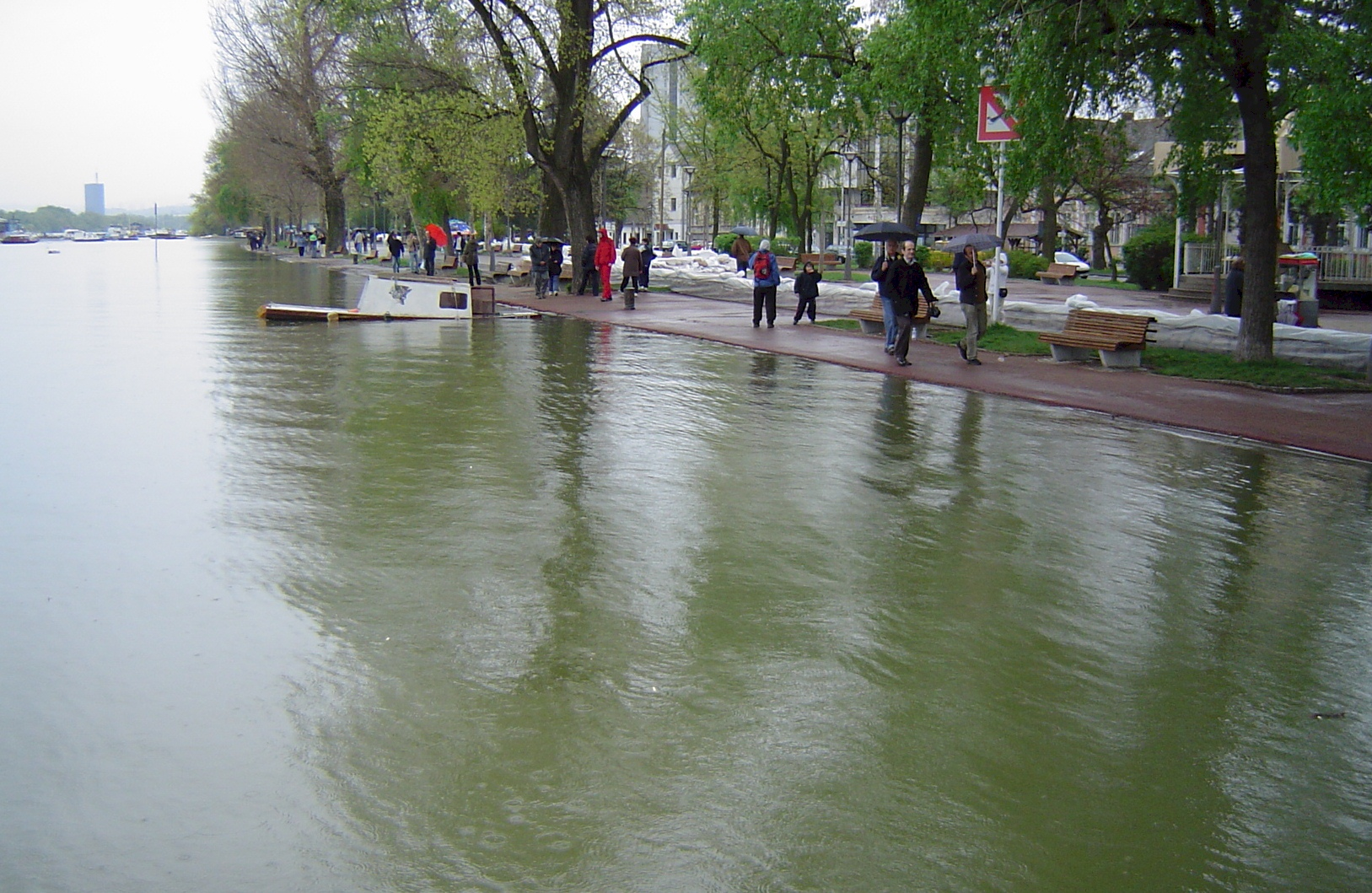
Zemunski Kej during the 2006 European floods

Zemunski Kej is the main Zemun's landing area for numerous boats. In 2014 the government set the area of the former port as the future revitalized port area. In April 2018 it was announced that the pier for the touristic ships and cruisers will be built on the quay. It was to be constructed near the Old Port Authority (Stara Kapetanija) where the old Zemun port was located. Designed to accept ships up to 120 m (390 ft) long and 15 m (49 ft) wide, the project was to be finished by the 2019 nautical season. It will be the second international touristic pier in Belgrade, after the one in Savamala neighborhood, on the Sava river. The central steel pontoon, 50 m (160 ft) long and 4 m (13 ft) wide, will serve for the boarding and disembarkation of the visitors.

Construction ultimately began in June 2019 and was to last for 120 days, or to December 2019. However, since the works didn't go as planned, in November 2019 the deadline was moved to March 2020 and the next nautical season. When construction of the supporting piles began, the slabs from the previous embankment were discovered so as several submerged vessels. The pier's bridge will be also 50 m (160 ft) long, with 20 piles, while the pontoon will rest on two dolphins. The piles are being founded to the depth of 10 m (33 ft) in order to endure the pressure of river ice, while some pontoons will be attached to the piles so that it may rise and fall, following the change of the Danube's water level. There was some initial resistance to the project among the local population, especially regarding the ecological aspect and influence on the nearby protected area of the Great War Island. The pier was finished on 6 June 2020, but the cruisers began docking only on 2 September 2023.

=== Bridge ===
In 1966, the military placed the pontoon bridge to connect the Lido Beach, on the Great War Island in Zemun, for the first time. The bridge was relocated from Ada Ciganlija where it was placed in 1961, after the permanent embankment at Ada was finished. It connected Zemunski Kej and the island, across an arm of the Danube. The bridge was later removed, and the idea of constructing a bridge to the Great War Island was officially abandoned by the city in 1972.

Since 1996, the pontoon bridge has been placed by the military almost every year. As the beach was almost wiped out during the disastrous 2006 European floods, the pontoon wasn't laid from 2006 to 2008. In general, the bridge is in place from July to September. It is 375 m (1,230 ft) long and placed by the engineering units of the Serbian Armed Forces. Placing of the bridge regularly sparks protest from the boatmen, either those who work as a ferrymen when there is no bridge, or those who are simply blocked in the Danube's arm between the island and the bank across it.

In time, there were several proposals of building a proper bridge to the island, though environmentalists are against it. A project for the bridge on two levels to the island was drafted. Designers envisioned that the top level ("upper bridge") would contain a scenic viewpoint and a restaurant. The idea was abandoned. It was partially done because the design for the bridge, made of concrete and wood, didn't take into the account high water levels of the Danube.

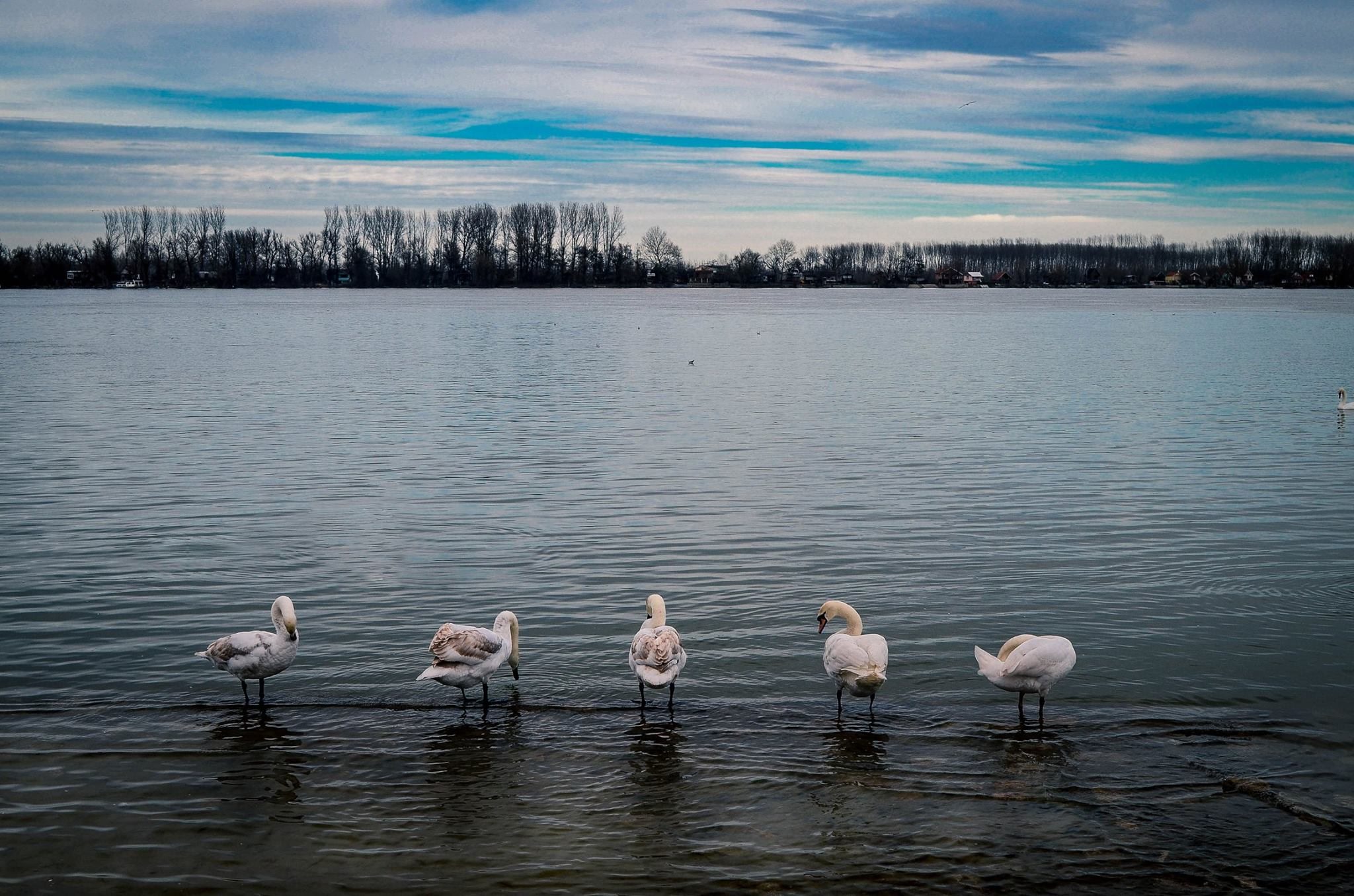
Numerous tame swans are a local attraction at the quay. Their numbers continue to grow and tend to migrate less and less.

In March 2016, mayor of Belgrade Siniša Mali announced the massive reconstruction of the Old Sava Bridge. However, in May 2017, after the project papers were publicized, it was discovered that the city actually plans to demolish the bridge completely and build a new one. Citizens protested while the experts rejected the reasons named by the authorities. Mali then said that the old bridge will not be demolished but moved, and that citizens will decide where, but he gave an idea to move it to Zemunski Kej, as the permanent pedestrian bridge to the Great War Island. Members of the Academy of Architecture of Serbia opposed the motion. They expressed fear that the seemingly benign idea is actually a strategically disastrous enterprise concerning the protected wildlife on the island. They also suspected that the administration, in this case just as in all previous ones, will ignore experts.

In June 2018, architect Bojan Kovačević stated that Mali got the idea of connecting the island because of the meeting held several month before, where the Eagle Hills company, an investor of the highly controversial Belgrade Waterfront project, discussed with the city officials a possibility of construction on the island. The project should include the private villas, golf courses and a de lux hotel. The Old Sava Bridge relocation to the Great War Island was ultimately scrapped.

During the summer of 2020, a group of Zemun's citizens organized petition for the construction of permanent bridge to the Great War Island. In September 2020, the municipal administration of Zemun forwarded the preliminary design of the possible bridge to the city administration. For 2022 city announced construction of the bridge from the quay to the Great War Island. The environmentalists and urbanists are continuously against the permanent bridge to the island, but city reiterated the construction plans in January 2022.

In August 2023, President of Serbia Aleksandar Vučić said that the "place for the bridge has been already found", to connect Zemun and the Great War Island, and that he will "nominate" the idea to citizens.

=== Eupolis park ===
In January 2022, plans were announced for the creation of the theme Eupolis park along the quay, stretching from the Hotel Jugoslavija on the south, to the skyscraper on Karađorđe Square on the north. It is part of the pilot project for forming a small, "blue-green" parks in urban environments. Belgrade was one of four pilot cities, the other three being Piraeus in Greece, Gladsaxe in Denmark and Łódź in Poland.

The area includes the locations of the Zemun Railway Station memorial ("collonettes"), amusement park, and children's playground ("castle"). Participants in the design competition were students of the University of Belgrade Faculty of Architecture. In March 2022, three works were selected, and the final design will be the amalgamation of all three. Apart from green-blue park (greenery and water), the project includes a small building of an ecological educational center.

== Characteristics ==
The residential areas include blocks 9-a and 11-c, while the mainly non-residential section includes blocks 9 and 11. In the neighborhood there are pedestrian paths or green areas used for recreation (including a large, formerly seasonal amusement park) and commercial facilities. The area used to host seasonal travelling circuses. In time, it became vast, mostly children oriented playground and fair-like attraction, including carousel, children castles, popcorn, cotton candy, street artists, souvenir shops, etc. Total park area along the quay covers 5.74 hectares (14.2 acres).

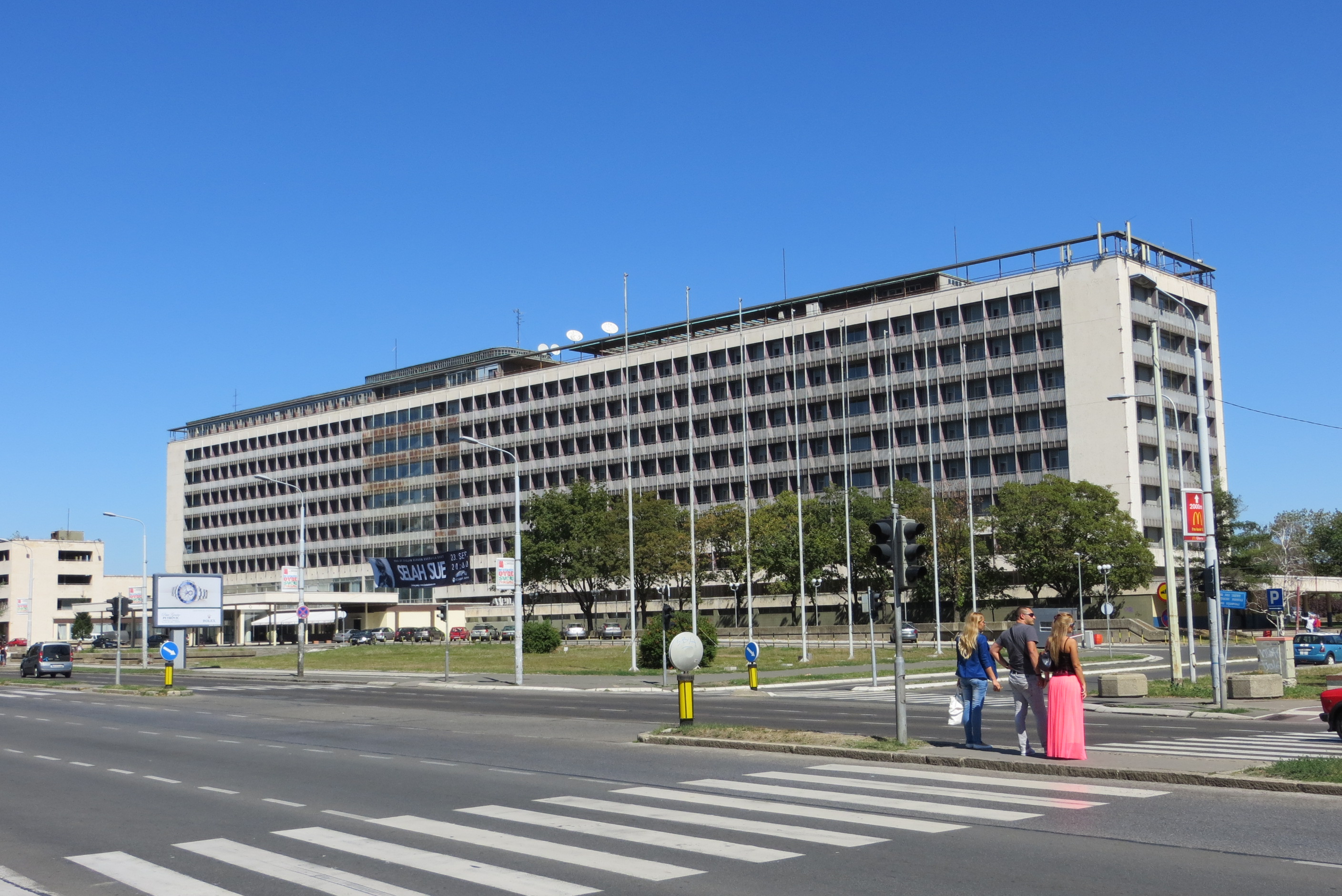
Hotel Jugoslavija in 2013

One of the largest hotels in Belgrade, "Hotel Jugoslavija" is located in the neighborhood, but it has been closed since the NATO bombing of Serbia in 1999 when it was badly damaged. It was partially reopened in 2007 as the largest casino in Belgrade, and one half of the hotel was reopened in 2013. In February 2014, new plans regarding "Jugoslavija" were announced. A five-star Kempinski hotel was planned to be fully reconstructed by 2019. The complex was to be upgraded with two towers with 33 floors, and a total floor area of 190,000 m^{2} (2,000,000 sq ft) on 5 ha (12 acres). This was forbidden by the city regulations, but the new city administration headed by Siniša Mali abolished the Highrise Study, allowing tall buildings all over the city. In 2015 the detailed regulatory plan which encompassed this project was adopted, despite the fierce opposition from the experts and public to the construction of the skyscrapers along the quay. The projected value of the works was €300 million. As of August 2019 nothing has been done regarding the project. Head of the "Hotel Jugoslavija Project" Iva Petrović said that they will have "more information" in October 2019, but as of July 2022, the project is still halted.

The key is also location of several old and famous kafanas in Zemun, like Venecija, Stara Kapetanija, Šaran, etc.

For the most part, the promenade is parallel to the street opened for traffic. Near the beginning of the promenade is one of major roundabouts in Zemun, with terminal bus stops for many public transportation bus lines (82, 85, 610, 611, 705). The promenade continues around Ušće and makes one continuous pedestrian path next to the neighborhoods of Staro Sajmište and Savski Nasip, alongside the left bank of the Sava.

Complete overhaul of the street began in October 2021. Project includes replacement of the complete communal infrastructure (electricity, waterworks, heating, sewage), construction of new parking lots, a special parking for the tourist buses, and a roundabout. The street will be partially expanded, and, also partially, the asphalt will be replaced with cobblestone.

As the bank (and thus the quay, too) follows the line of the nearby Great War Island, it is the beginning point of the pontoon bridge which seasonally connects the Lido beach on the island with the mainland.

The main access street to the southern, Hotel Jugoslavija section, is Bulevar Maršala Tolbuhina, previously called Goce Delčeva Street. In the 21st century, a numerous food venues were opened. They were mostly fast food and take-out restaurants and grills, and their number continuously grew ("more fast-food venues than elements in Mendeleev's periodic table"). In many cases they are opened 24/7, and in time the social phenomenon developed - constant queues of people which spread along the street waiting for food day and night. For this, the street became known as the "Street of the Hungry", "Valley of the Hungry" or "Has Vegas" (has is Belgrade slang for eating).

=== Memorials ===
Airmen monument

A monument dedicated to 11 pilots of the Royal Yugoslav Army Air Force, killed in action during the Axis attack on Yugoslavia in 1941, was built in 1994. It was sculptured by Miodrag Živković.

Zemun Railway Station memorial

There is a memorial commemorating the original Zemun railway station. The station was located close to the modern Hotel Jugoslavija. It was built in 1883, during the rule of Austria-Hungary, when the railway, which connected Zemun to Novi Sad, was finished. In 1884 the railway was extended across the Sava into the Kingdom of Serbia as the first railway in the country. The station was operational until 1970. Architect Milun Stambolić designed a memorial complex which consists of five pillars, which used to hold the station's overhang, and several meters of railroad tracks. The complex is placed on the plateau next to the hotel, on the small elevation above the promenade along the Danube. The memorial complex was set in the 1980s.

John Hunyadi monument

On 22 July 2019, a monument to the medieval Hungarian knight John Hunyadi (Serbian Cyrillic: Сибињанин Јанко, Sibinjanin Janko), was dedicated on the promenade. Hunyadi defended Belgrade against the Ottoman Turks during the 1456 Siege of Belgrade. Presidents of both Serbia and Hungary, Aleksandar Vučić and János Áder, attended the dedication.

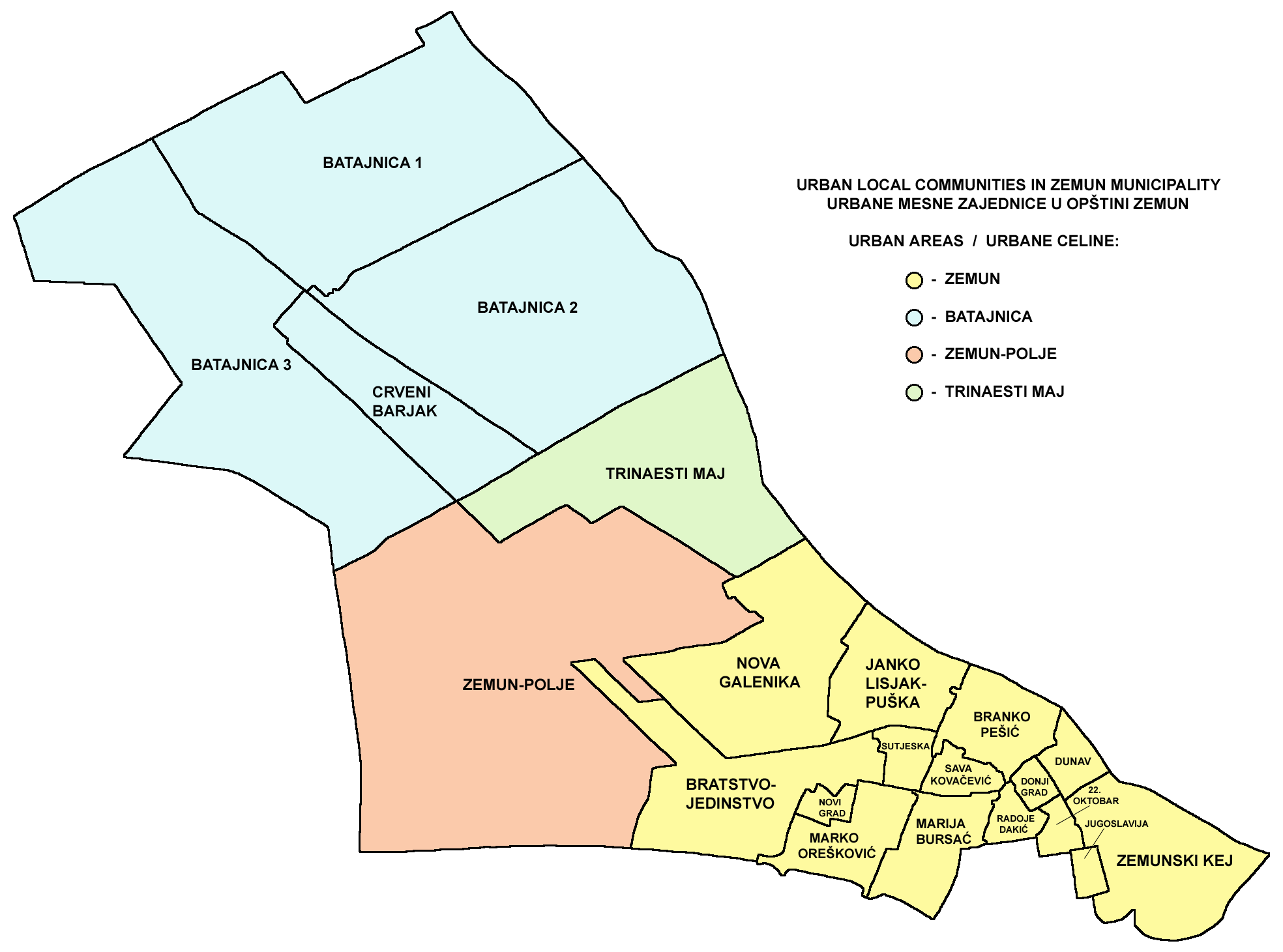
Map of Urban local communities in Zemun municipality

Immediately, the monument became the subject of ridicule. Hunyadi was described as being placed in the shower stall. The statue holding a sword, work of Hungarian sculptor István Madarasi, was unfavorably compared to the existing monuments to Hunyadi in Budapest and Romania. Described as looking like a cartoon or a comic book character, it became a hit on social media, where people "guessed" who is actually represented by the statue: actors Zoran Radmilović (in his iconic Ubu Roi role) and Ljuba Moljac, theatrical director Ljubiša Ristić, DJ and radio host Marko Janković (radio host), cartoon, animated or literature characters Asterix, Sir Giles, Don Quixote and Tin Woodman, Joan of Arc with mustache, Kinder Surprise toy, etc.

A week after the unveiling, on the night of 30 to 31 July, the statue's sword, which was loosely attached to the statue, was stolen but police apprehended the culprits on the same day. They were three art students, claiming they removed the sword in protest. In September 2019 someone placed a wooden sword, decorated with flowers, in the statue's empty hand. Madarasi reattached the original sword on 2 October 2019. By January 2020 the effects of the elements on the copper statue were quite visible.

Branko Najhold memorial bench

On 18 June 2020, a memorial to Branko Najhold (1947-2016) was dedicated on the promenade. Najhold was an author, founder of the International Zemun's Caricature Salon and an avid chronicler of Zemun. The memorial, representing a figure of Najhold sitting on a bench, was sculptured by Stevan Filipović.

== Administration ==
Zemunski Kej made a local community (mesna zajednica, municipal sub-administrative division) within the municipality of Zemun. It split from the local community of Donji Grad before the 1991 census, when it had a population of 3,927. In the next census, in 2002, it had 3,649 inhabitants. Local communities in the urban core of Zemun were later abolished.

Including local communities which are adjacent to the entire promenade (Dunav and Jugoslavija), the entire neighborhood had a total population of 13,385 in 1991 and 12,112 in 2002.
