= Restaurant Venecija =

Restaurant in Belgrade, Serbia

Coordinates: 44.846118°N 20.415700°E

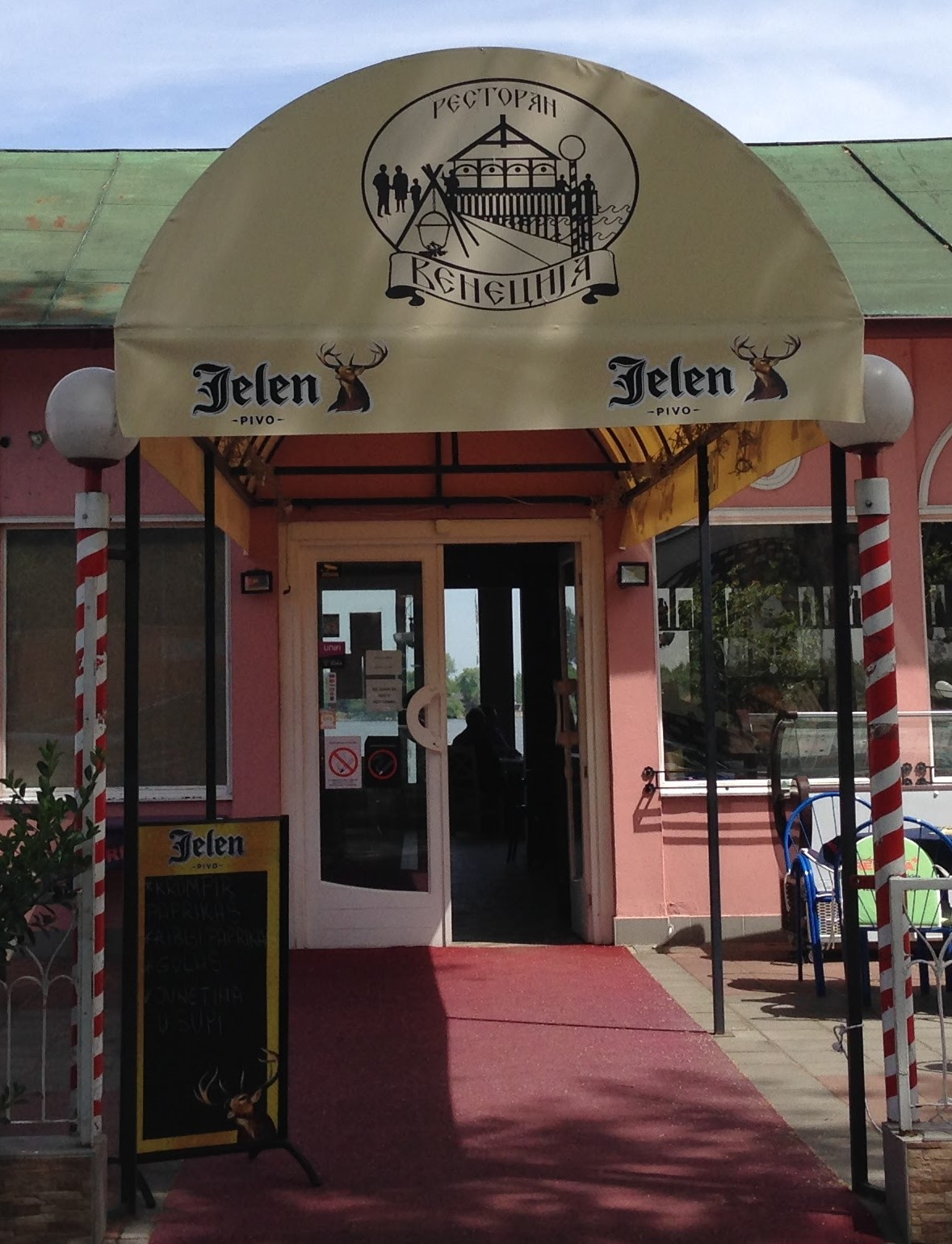
Restaurant Venecija main entrance

Restaurant Venecija (Serbian: Ресторан Венеција, romanized: Restoran Venecija) is a restaurant in Belgrade, the capital of Serbia. It is located in the neighborhood and former separate city, Zemun, and for decades was one of Zemun's and Belgrade's most popular restaurants, due to its panoramic position above the Danube and being synonymous with good service and quality food. Opened in 1913, it is in the process of being declared a cultural monument. It has been described as the "bohemian hub of Zemun...the crossroads of many generations of fishermen, artists, journalists and politicians", and a "symbol of Old Zemun and Old Belgrade". It is credited with "symbolically connecting two towns, even before the official merger".

Despite the "iconic" status it achieved in over a century, in April 2019 "Venecija" was transformed into the Chinese restaurant "Lotus". However, by the summer of 2020, the restaurant, including the name, was restored.

== Location ==
Situated on the southeast slopes of Gardoš, the restaurant is located in Zemunski Kej, in the neighborhood of Donji Grad. It is placed on the very bank of the Danube. The official location of Venecija is 6 Kej Oslobođenja.

== History ==
=== Origin ===
The restaurant was opened in 1913 by Aleksandar Štrajher (1861-1913), a reputable merchant, landowner and rentier, who was also a deputy mayor of Zemun. He opened it in the newly built summer pavilion next to the, now defunct, Zemun's port authority. The pavilion was made of wood and constructed by Josip Bogner.

Originally a fish restaurant, it soon became famous for its fish soup and a good ambience. Apart from the local guests from Zemun, being located right next to the port building, the restaurant had a constant influx of visitors. Even though Zemun and Belgrade were at two different states at the time, Austria-Hungary and Serbia, respectively, it soon became popular among Belgrade's elite. Many sportsmen, authors, journalists, actors and actresses opted to go through the complicated border procedure just to come to Venecija, either by boat or train. They included actors Ilija Stanojević, Dobrica Milutinović, Bogoboj Rucović and Svetislav Dinulović, writers Branislav Nušić and Bora Stanković, journalists Darko F. Ribnikar and Jovan Tanović, actress Zorka Todosić, etc. Popularity among Belgraders lasted until July 1914, when the World War I broke out.

=== Interbellum ===
After the war was over in 1918, the pavilion, basically constructed as the temporary edifice, was demolished. A new, ground-floor building was constructed instead. It had a large terrace, partially above the Danube, which was built on stilts. Because of that, the restaurant got its name (Venecija, Serbian for Venice). Managed by the leaseholder Sima Ivanov, the restaurant became even more popular during the Interbellum, as both Zemun and Belgrade were now in one state, and in 1934 Zemun lost a separate city status and became part of Belgrade. Daily guests mostly included local inhabitants who would play chess or dominoes. In the evenings, the Belgraders would arrive and it was a matter of prestige to bring your out-of-town guests to Venecija.

=== After 1944 ===
After the World War II, Venecija remained the most popular restaurant in Zemun for a long time. The restaurant was noted for its panoramic position overlooking the Danube and for the quality food and service. The restaurant was nationalized after 1945 by the new Communist authorities and became part of the "Central" company, which also comprised, among other facilities, one of the most famous hotels in Zemun, "Central", founded in 1894.

Due to its position, the restaurant, and especially the terrace, were always flooded during the high levels of the Danube, so several attempts were made to construct Zemunski Kej in such a way to protect the restaurant, and Zemun in general, from flooding. When hydroelectrical plant Đerdap I began to fill its reservoir in the late 1960s, due to the backwater of the Danube, underground waters in Zemun and New Belegrade got elevated and the cellars of the buildings got flooded. To prevent this, the high embankment with the promenade was built in 1967 so the Danube rarely flooded the quay (most notably in 1981). In September 2007 reconstruction of the quay’s 350 m (1,150 ft) long section began including further elevation of the embankment, widening of the pedestrian path and construction another one on separate level, completion of the cycling path, etc. Works, which were the first works on any embankments in Belgrade since 1990, were finished in 2008. Works continued in 2010-2011. After being elevated by one meter in 1967 to the point 70.5 m (231 ft), embankment was further raised to the points 73.5 m (241 ft) in 2010 and 77 m (253 ft) in 2011, thus preventing any further floodings as the recorded water level was never higher than that. Over 450 m (1,480 ft) of the embankment was first solidified with 17,000 m^{3} (600,000 cu ft) of different materials, then consolidated with beams and further elevated with 20,000 m^{3} (710,000 cu ft) of sand, gravel and stone. As of 2017, the restaurant is 20 m (66 ft) away from the bank, separated from the river by the promenade.

=== Decline ===
The company was privatized in July 2007 and the quality of the service fell drastically and it appeared that the restaurant became part of criminal activities, typical for the Serbian transition economy. The private owners changed soon, and it turned out that the latter owner leased the restaurant to his own company. On 1 October 2010, the owner filed for bankruptcy and the state appointed the bankruptcy manager. In August 2011 the state annulled the 2007 privatization and the company became a state property again. In December 2012 the bankruptcy was officially declared and in June 2013, instead of celebrating 100th anniversary, the restaurant was closed due to the financial situation. The state then leased the restaurant to the "Planum" company in November 2013. State opted for leasing at this moment because the heirs to the pre-war owners of Venecija applied for restitution, which legally blocked the selling of the premises. "Planum" re-opened the restaurant in January 2014 after extensive repairs as parts of the restaurant were ruined.

In August 2017, the state decided to sell the restaurant. This prompted stories about the real leaseholders of "Venecija" as news reports claimed that one of them was Predrag Ranković Peconi, one of Serbian "controversial businessmen". Peconi's right-hand man Aleksandar Kajmaković's company "Eureka Bar" was а leaseholder since 2015, when in March 2017 Peconi's legs were bullet-riddled in a shootout in another of his properties, hotel "Prag". Ownership of the Venecija was mentioned as a possible reason for the shootout. Željko Rutović, who shot Peconi, and Joca Amsterdam, were also eying the restaurant.

The first attempt at selling the venue in September 2017 failed. The state estimated "Venecija" to 105.3 million dinars (€880,000) but no one offered to buy it. In December 2017, the state offered "Venecija" once more, this time for 95 million dinars (€795,000), but after two contestants finished the bidding, the price rose to 110 million dinars (€920,000) and the new owner became Swiss entrepreneur Johan Peter Züger.

Without any announcement, in April 2019 the venue was adapted into the Chinese restaurant "Lotus". This caused a vocal discontent in the social media and among the residents of Zemun. A new owner was "Lotus Restaurant Ltd", owned by Chinese-Cypriot entrepreneur Aidi Jiang. In August 2020 it was reported that the former restaurant was restored, so as its original name. By the summer of 2022, Venecija received a complete makeover.

== Architecture ==
The building of the restaurant covers 155 m^{2} (1,670 sq ft). It is adjoined by the terrace ("summer garden") with 372 m^{2} (4,000 sq ft) and a covered section with 199 m^{2} (2,140 sq ft). After numerous reconstructions and repairs after 1945, almost nothing of the original architecture remained. As of 2017, the pink façade is done in the rustic manner which reminiscence the "old kafana look". The exteriors are ornamented with the decorative columns painted in red and white, for which "Venecija" became visually recognizable, while the interior is modernized.

After the 2022 renovation, the restaurant's exterior won Zemun's annual municipal competition for the most beautiful flower alley in June 2022.
