= Rast, Dolj =

Rast
- Commune
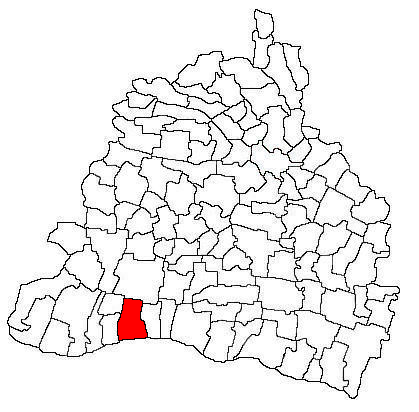
- Location in Dolj County

- Location in Romania
- Coordinates: 43°53′N 23°17′E
- Country: Romania
- County: Dolj
- Area: 82.12 km^{2} (31.71 sq mi)
- Population (2021-12-01): 3,198
  - Density: 38.94/km^{2} (100.9/sq mi)
- Time zone: UTC+02:00 (EET)
  - Summer (DST): UTC+03:00 (EEST)
- Vehicle reg.: DJ

Rast is a commune in Dolj County, Oltenia, Romania. It is composed of a single village, Rast.

The locality was severely affected by flooding in the April 2006 Danube floods, with more than 4,000 evacuated residents and hundreds of households destroyed.
