= 2006 European floods =

Floods affecting Eastern Europe

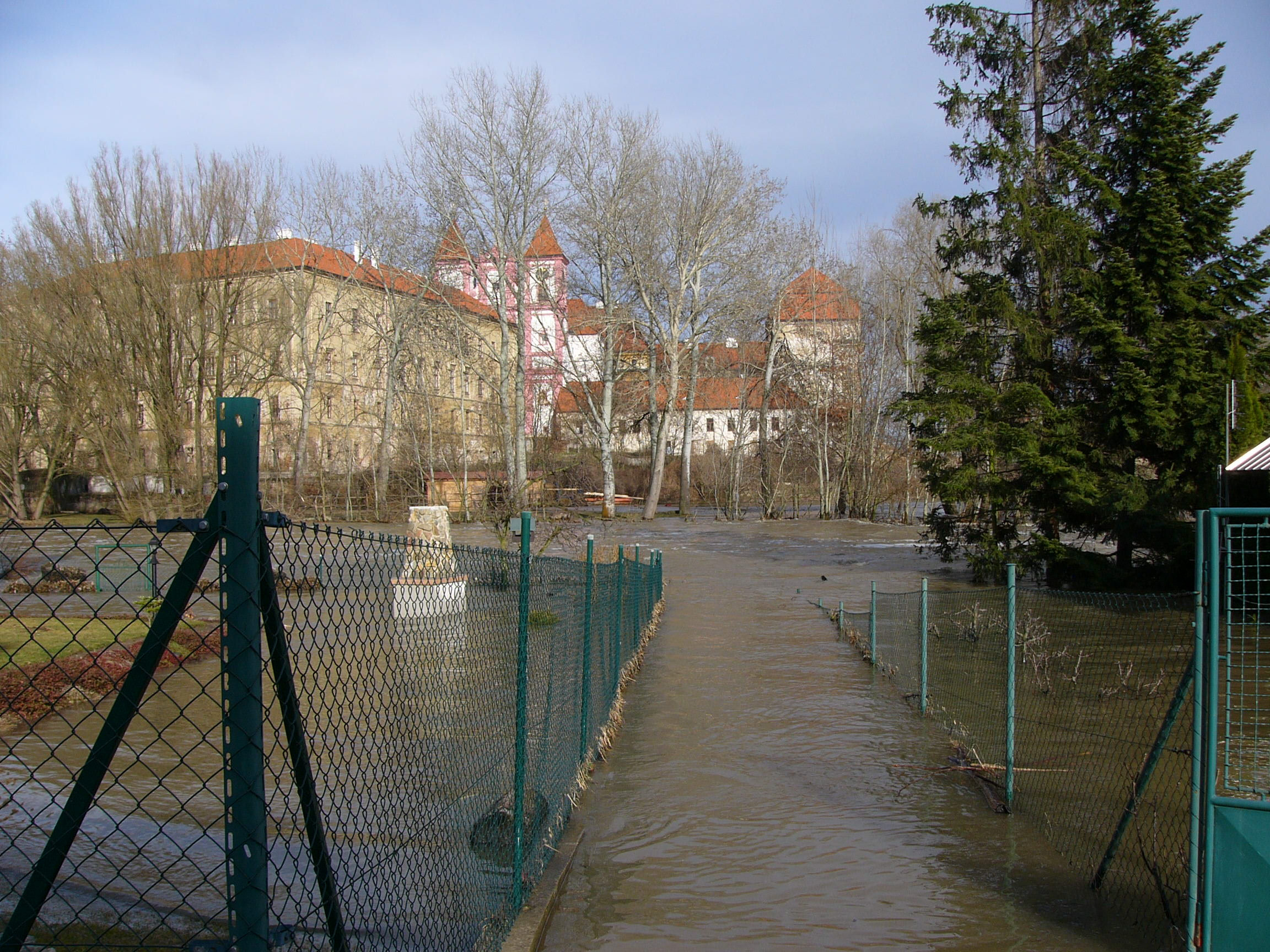
The flood's effects in Znojmo.

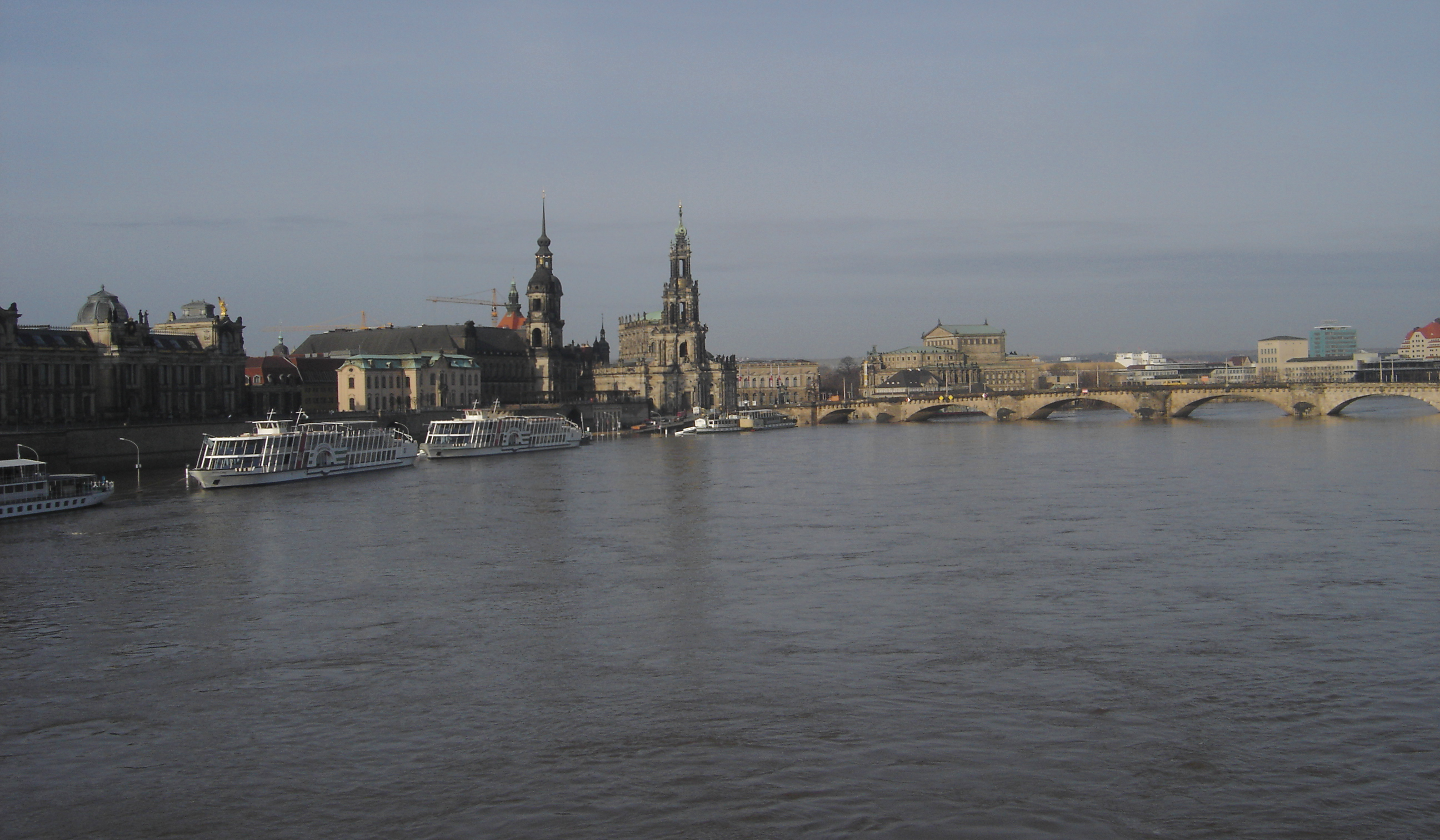
The flood's effects in Dresden.

From February to April 2006 many rivers across Europe, especially the Elbe and Danube, swelled due to heavy rain and melting snow and rose to record levels. These are the longest rivers in Central Europe.

== Southeastern Europe ==
High Danube levels caused significant flooding in parts of Serbia, Bulgaria and Romania, with damage to property and infrastructure in localities near the shores of the river. The effects of high water across Southeastern Europe were blamed on the poor levee systems in the affected countries.

=== Bulgaria ===
Flooding in Nikopol, Bulgaria

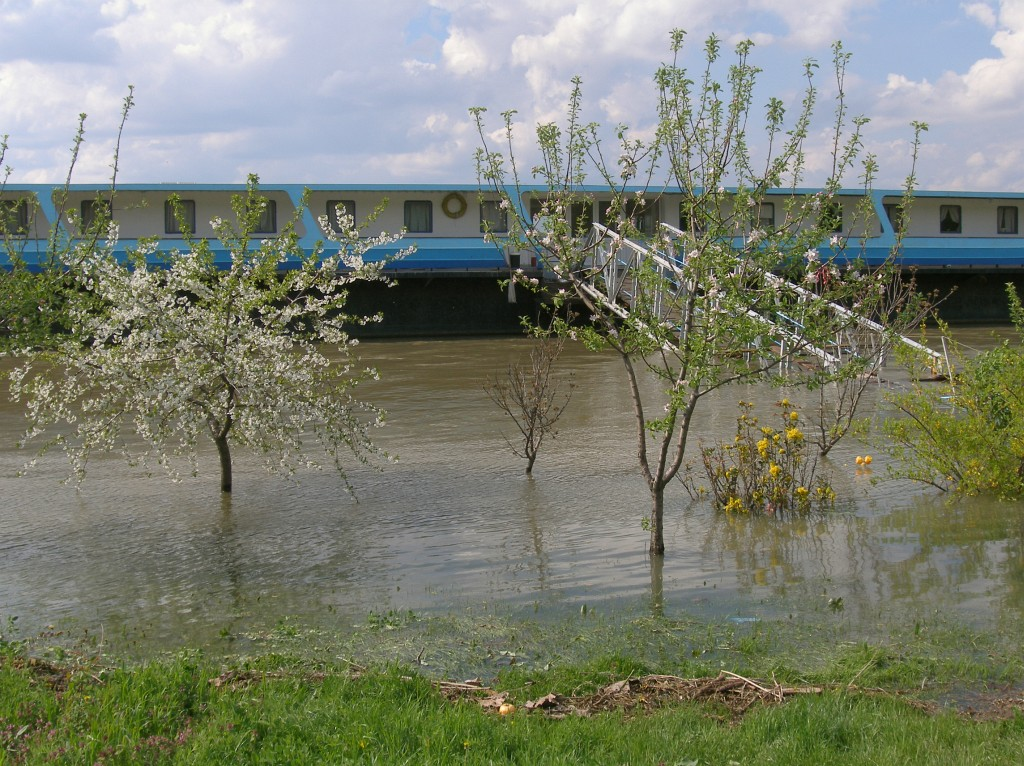
Trees in Rousse, Bulgaria show the rise of water level

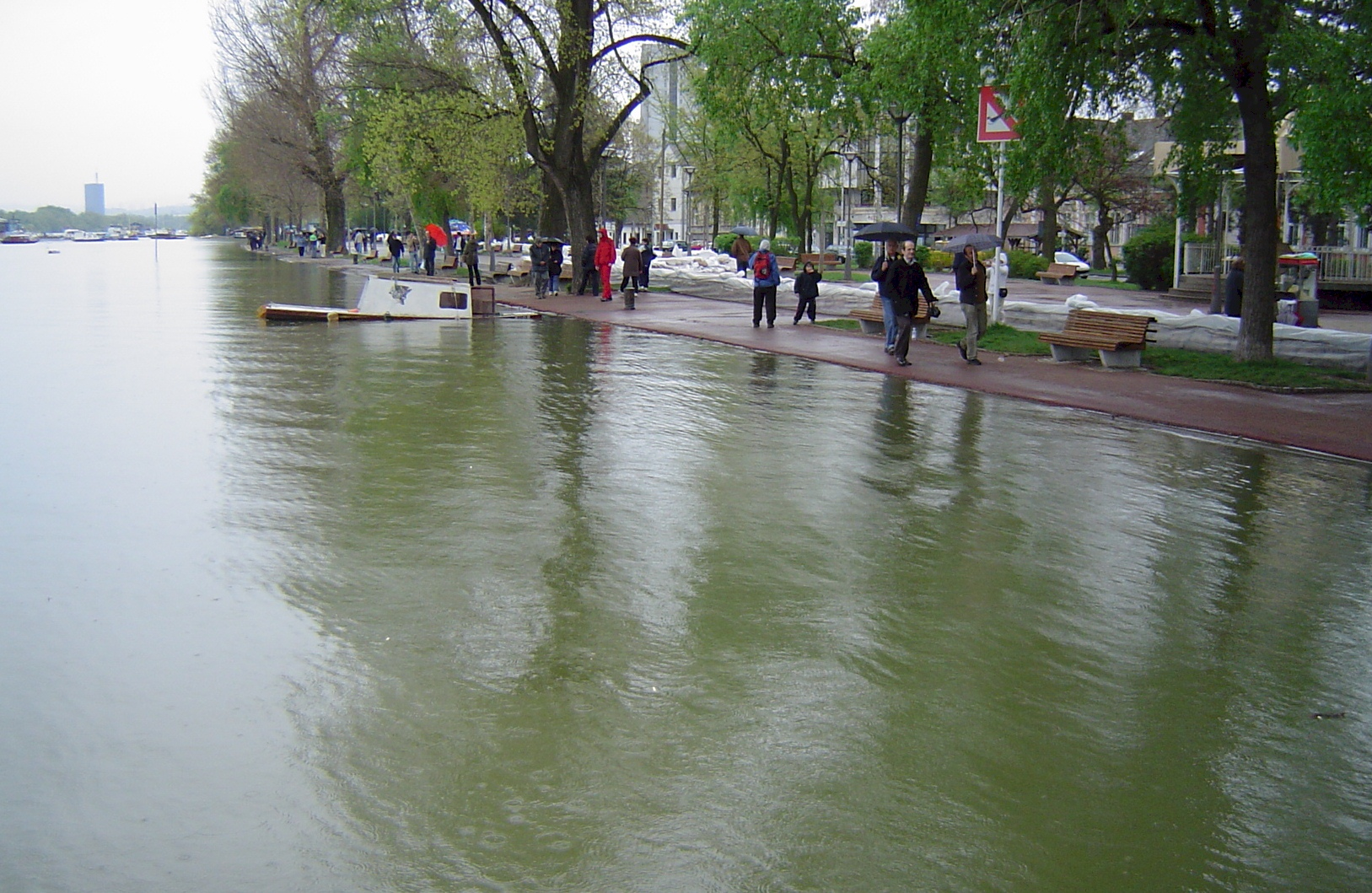
Danube at Zemun, Serbia, at its highest level

In Vidin an industrial district was flooded and over 300 people were evacuated to a tent city about 20 kilometers from the town. In Lom, Bulgaria 25 houses, a hotel, the port (which is the second biggest Bulgarian port on the River Danube), and the Danube Park were flooded. Boruna quarter in the north-western part of the city has declared a state of emergency. Of the 30,000 people who live in Lom, 6,000 people are in danger due to the flooding. The two schools are prepared to accommodate any people if found necessary. A few blocks along the water's edge in the city of Nikopol were flooded. 60 people were evacuated and 57 buildings have been flooded so far as well as the main road from Nikopol west towards Pleven. In Rousse the Danube reached 9 meters, beating the previous record at 8,88 from 1970. In total at least 400 buildings on Bulgaria's northern border have been flooded and several have been completely destroyed.

=== Romania ===
The 2006 European floods were one of the most devastating natural disaster from the History of Romania. Although there were no human victims, the estimated damage is thought to surpass the floods of 1970.

By April 16 over 848 houses were reportedly flooded, with 221 destroyed. The height of the Danube at the beginning of the flood was still below the record level registered in 1895. Romanian officials ordered the controlled flooding of thousands of hectares of unused agricultural spaces to prevent further damage in cities across Romania.

On April 16, in the localities of Rast and Negoi, Dolj County, more than 800 residents were evacuated, as a dam collapsed due to the rising waters of the Danube. Hundreds of houses were flooded and more than 100 of them collapsed.

By April 22, the number of people evacuated from the locality reached 4,000. In the port city of Călărași, a recently opened hotel was flooded on Monday, April 17, causing significant damage to the building and leading to the evacuation of tens of tourists. By this date, the floods had swamped 730 km^{2} (280 square miles) of land, 400 kilometres (250 mi) of roads and destroyed 20 bridges, while also causing agricultural damage amounting to 4.6 million lei (US$1.5 million). Additionally, five of Romania's nine Danube ports were closed during the flooding period. However, Romanian authorities said on April 22 that the worst of the flooding had passed. Elena Anghel, hydrologist at Romania's National Hydrology Institute stated that, "The forecasts are optimistic. The river will probably remain stable for another two days and then start to fall."

However, by April 28, after several weeks of pressure, key levées along the Danube began collapsing in the counties of Dolj, Călărași, Constanța, Tulcea and Galați. The authorities carried out further evacuations in these regions, the number of evacuated people rising to 16,000. By this date, over 300 houses were completely destroyed with more than 150 villages and towns being directly affected by the floods.

=== Serbia ===
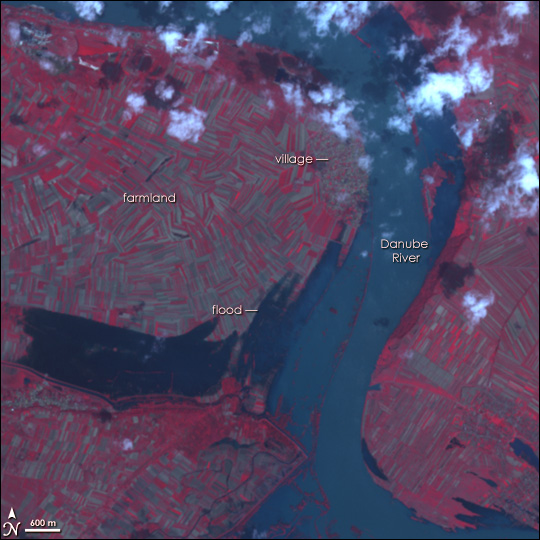
The Danube spills over into farm fields in the northeastern corner of Serbia in this image, taken by the ASTER on NASA's Terra satellite on April 24, 2006.

On April 16, 2006, a state of emergency was declared in 10 regions of Serbia. The areas around Serbia's second largest city Novi Sad were particularly vulnerable. A dozen cities were damaged and hundreds of people were evacuated. Near Veliko Gradište, the Danube reached heights as high as 9.65 meters (over 30 ft). Many people left the regions because water could not be purified.

=== Other countries ===
Floods were also reported in the North Macedonia, where several villages were flooded in North Macedonia's Pelagonija Valley.

== Germany and Czech Republic ==
The Elbe River also rose 13 centimeters higher than in 2002 in some areas, creating 150-year-record-highs. In Germany, the medieval town of Hitzacker had water levels of 7.63 meters, destroying many buildings and causing considerable damage to other private property. Also affected was the town of Lauenburg. The German federal state of Saxony and the Czech Republic were not as affected, because in the four years after the record floodings of 2002, the two partners built a stronger levee system along the Elbe. On April 17, all states of emergencies in all counties of the German federal states of Lower Saxony, Saxony-Anhalt and Brandenburg were rescinded.

== Hungary ==
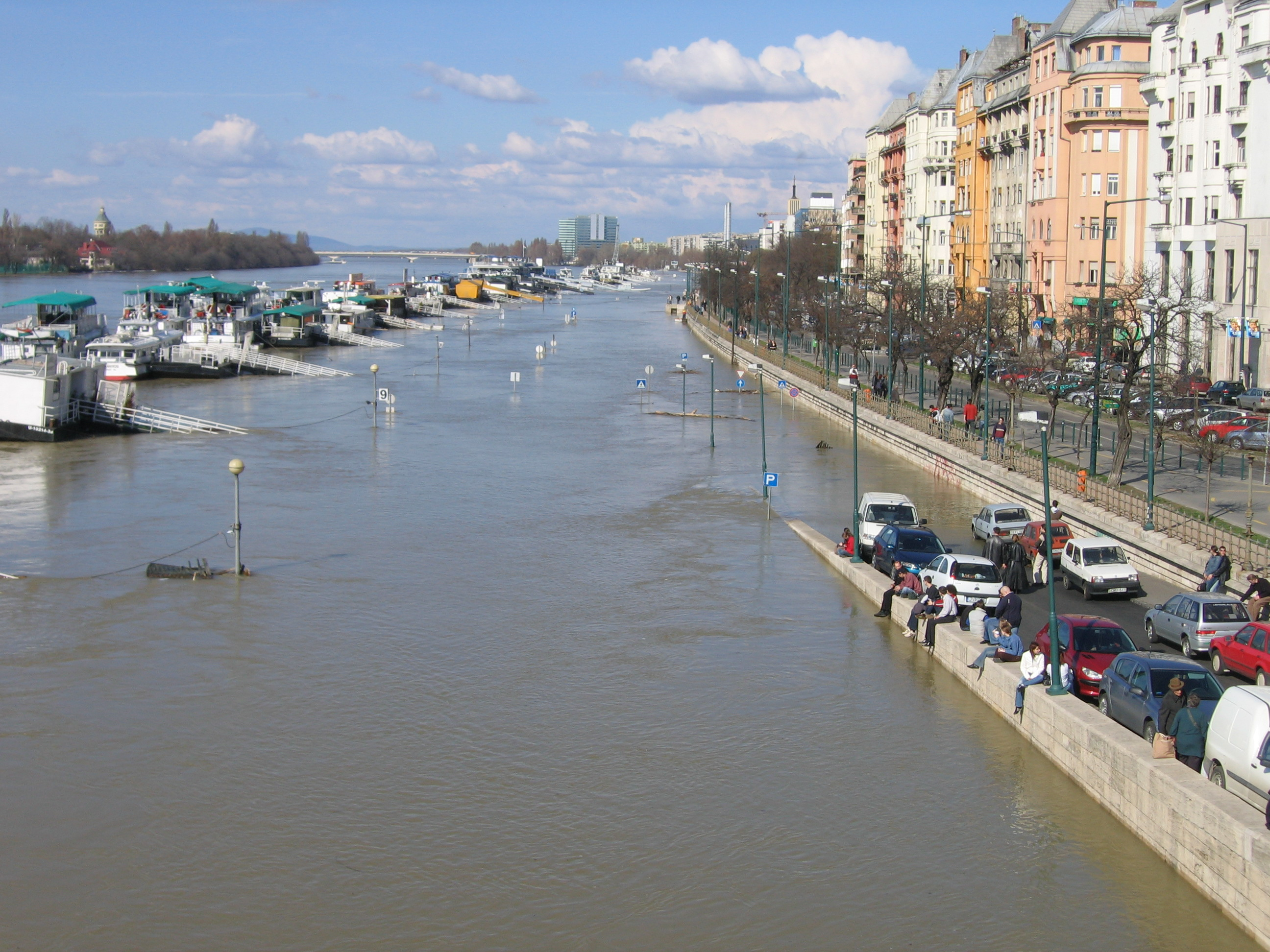
Pest, at the Margaret Island. There is a complete roadway under the water (2006-04-03)

The Danube river was at its peak 865 cm (28 ft 4 in) high in Budapest, Hungary, higher than the previous record of 848 cm in 2002. During the floods, approximately 11,000 buildings were in danger of flood damage, 32,000 people were threatened by the water, and 1.72 square kilometres (475 acres) of land were actually under water. Officials also placed most of the area near the Danube under a Level 3 Alert (on a 3-level scale). The flood was so severe that it threatened to spill into the underground in Budapest, through the Batthyány tér station — this, however, did not occur. The underground train stations Batthyány tér and Margit híd (HÉV) were closed out of precaution.

The timing of the flood, incidentally, coincided with the Hungarian general elections.

== Causes ==
Many dikes and levees breached because of a poor construction by local and national officials and of an unusual long and hard winter in Central Europe. The snowfall lasted well into April and many areas were frozen, so frost emerged, soaking the earth full of water.

== Humanitarian aid ==
The Red Cross sent humanitarian aid in the form of blankets and mattresses to affected areas.

== See also ==
- 2005 European floods
- 2002 European floods
