= List of streets and squares in Belgrade =

There are over 2,500 streets on the territory of the administrative City of Belgrade. Not all of them are located within the borders of the Belgrade city itself, and this list will deal only with those situated in the city.

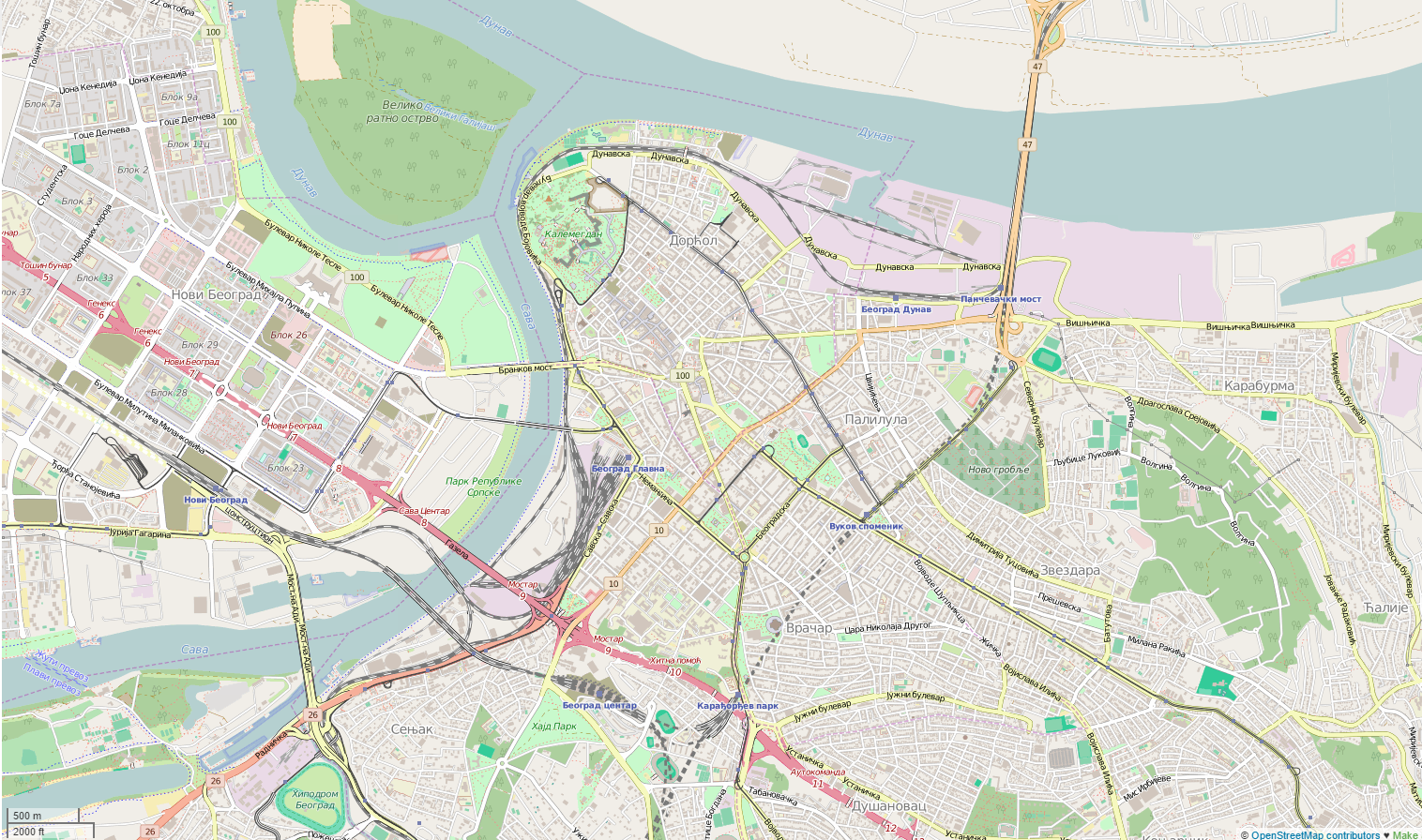
Street map of Belgrade

== Introduction ==
Some streets were already unofficially named during the Ottoman period, before 1806. They were named after the mosques (Tefderdarska, Bajrak), well-known Ottomans who lived in them (Jaja-Pašina, Eski-Agina, Deli-Ahmetova) or the local artisans (Bitpazarska, Spahijska, Čauška, Delijska). During the 18th century occupation by the Austrians, they renamed some of the streets (Bitpazarska to Dunavska) and named others (Eugena Savojskog [modern Braće Baruh], Carigradska [modern Vasina], Apotekarska, Kamenička, Klosterska, Tri Hana).

After the liberation from the Ottomans in 1806, the streets were not named; instead the houses were numbered according to the quarter to which they belonged. On 15 March 1847, the city administration asked the Ministry of the Interior to do the numbering of the houses. The ministry decided to divide the entire city into six quarters and to name streets "within the [Laduon's] trench", which divided Belgrade in two. The ministry named 30 streets on 9 February 1848, while 40 alleys remained unnamed as the ministry deemed they did not need names. None of the streets are named today the way they were in 1848; some names survived, but were later given to other streets.

Street names in 1848
Name		Modern location
Roman	Cyrillic	Modern location
Bitpazar	Битпазар	Cara Dušana
Cukićeva	Цукићева	Zmaja od Noćaja (section from Kralja Petra to Academy Park)
Dositejeva	Доситејева	Gospodar-Jevremova (section from Kralja Petra to Zmaj Jovina)
Džamijska	Џамијска	Gospodar-Jevremova (section from Kralja Petra to Kalemegdan)
Glavna Čaršija	Главна чаршија	Kralja Petra (section from Kosančićev Venac to Uzun Mirkova)
Hajduk Veljkova	Хајдук Вељкова	Dobračina
Jalijska	Јалијска	Jevrejska
Jelenska	Јеленска	Ivan-Begova
Kalemegdanska	Калемегданска	Knez Mihailova (section from Kralja Petra to Kalemegdan)
Kujundžina	Кујунџина	Višnjićeva (section)
Lomina	Ломина	Uzun Mirkova
Menzulska	Мензулска	Rajićeva
Mitropolitska	Митрополитска	Kneza Sime Markоvića
Mladenova	Младенова	Gospodar-Jovanova (section)
Molerova	Молерова	Gospodar-Jovanova (section)
Pljakina	Пљакина	Simina
Policajna	Полицајна	Vuka Karadžića (section)
Saraf-Kostina	Сараф-Костина	Cara Lazara
Sava-Kapijska	Сава-капијска	Pariska
Stambol-Kapijska	Стамбол-капијска	Vase Čarapića
Šarene Mejane	Шарене мејане	Gračanička (lower section)
Školska	Школска	Gračanička (upper section)
Varoš-Kapijska	Варош-капијска	Čubrina
Vojvodina	Војводина	Knez Mihailova (section from Kralja Petra to Terazije)
Zerečka	Зеречка	Kralja Petra (section from Uzun Mirkova to Cara Dušana)
Živkovićeva	Живковићева	Rige od Fere

After the dynastic change in 1858, streets were to be renamed. Prince Mihailo Obrenović formed the commission in 1864. This was also the first municipal Belgrade commission which named the streets. The commission worked for years. After the prince was assassinated in 1868, the commission's first decision was to name Knez Mihailova Street after him. The work was finished in March 1872, when 60 streets were named. Of those, 29 never changed their names. The record is held by the Svetogorska Street which changed its name seven times, while Dečanska Street changed its name six times. Only 6%, or 150, are named after women. New Communist authorities after 1945 changed the names of 160 streets in Belgrade's central area. After democratic change in 2000, 267 names from the Communist period were changed or restored to their original, pre-war names. In total, over 500 streets received new or changed names in the 2004–2008 period.

From 30 named streets in 1848, the number grew to 60 in 1872, 176 in 1882 and 213 in 1895. The first permanent commission for the naming of the streets was founded in 1888 as Odbor za naimenovanje ulica. They initially decided to change previous names as little as possible and name them after the most deserving individuals, Serbian rivers, areas, and mountains. Also, they decided to name streets close to the Belgrade Fortress after the rebels from the First Serbian Uprising, who participated in the liberation of Belgrade in 1806.

== Characteristics ==
The streets which never changed their names are:

- Balkanska
- Cara Dušana
- Cetinjska
- Delijska
- Dobračina
- Dositejeva
- Kamenička
- Knez Mihailova
- Kondina
- Kosančićev Venac
- Kosovska
- Kralja Milutina
- Kraljevića Marka
- Lomina
- Obilićev Venac
- Prizrenska
- Pop Lukina
- Rajićeva
- Simina
- Skadarska
- Solunska
- Srebrenička
- Topličin Venac
- Uzun Mirkova
- Velike Stepenice
- Višegradska
- Vladetina
- Zeleni Venac
- Zetska

The longest street in the densely urbanized area of the city is the Bulevar kralja Aleksandra with 7.5 km (4.7 mi). The longest overall is the Obrenovac Road, with 11 km (6.8 mi). With only 12 m (39 ft), the Lovačka Street in the outer neighborhood of Žarkovo is officially the shortest street. In downtown, the two shortest streets are the Marka Leka and the Laze Pačua which are 45 m (148 ft) and 48 m (157 ft) long, respectively. They have no numbers as all the buildings located in them are numbered from the neighboring streets.

As of 2017, the busiest street in Belgrade is Bulevar vojvode Mišića: 8,000 vehicles per hour in one direction during the morning rush hour.

== List ==
=== Major streets ===
Image	Name	Starting location	Neighborhoods	Notes
	Balkanska	44.813193°N 20.460167°E	Terazije, Savamala, Zeleni Venac	Formerly an artisan street, as a direct and closest connection from the Sava port and Belgrade's main railway and bus stations with downtown, for decades the first part of Belgrade travelers would see upon their arrival. Named after the Balkans.
	Bulevar Despota Stefana	44.816567°N 20.464426°E	Republic Square, Skadarlija, Stari Grad, Jevremovac, Palilula, Profesorska Kolonija, Viline Vode, Bogoslovija, Ada Huja, Stara Karaburma	Important traffic route, connects downtown to Pančevo Bridge. Previously, for decades, named 29. novembra. Also known for the headquarters of the city police. Named after Despot Stefan Lazarević (1377–1427).
	Bulevar Kralja Aleksandra	44.810271°N 20.466436°E	Pioneers Park, Tašmajdan, Krunski Venac, Palilula, Vukov Spomenik, Zvezdara, Đeram, Lipov Lad, Lion, Cvetko, Učiteljsko Naselje, Zeleno Brdo, Mali Mokri Lug, Kaluđerica	The longest street in the densely urbanized area of the city, with 7.5 km (4.7 mi). A commercial street, known simply as the Bulevar. Renamed "Bulevar Crvene Armije" 1945–52 and "Bulevar Revolucije" 1952–97. Named after King Alexander Obrenović (1876–1903).
	Jurija Gagarina	44.803720°N 20.425829°E	Savski Nasip, Belville, Delta City, Blokovi, Dr Ivan Ribar	One of the most important traffic streets in New Belgrade, stretching connecting the central and western parts of the municipality. Named after Yuri Gagarin (1934–68).
	Knez Mihailova	44.815129°N 20.459799°E	Terazije, Obilićev Venac, Kosančićev Venac, Kalemegdan	Commercial hub of downtown Belgrade. For decades known as the korzo (main city promenade, after Via del Corso in Rome), full pedestrian zone since 1987. In 1979 protected by the law as the Spatial Cultural-Historical Unit of Great Importance. Named after Prince Mihailo Obrenović (1823–68).
	Kneza Miloša	44.810113°N 20.465587°E	Tašmajdan, Pioneers Park, Krunski Venac, Andrićev Venac, London, Savamala, Park Gavrilo Princip, West Vračar, Mostar	One of the major traffic arteries of Belgrade, a main korzo in the 19th century when was called the "Topčider Road". Street with the largest number of embassies in the city. Named after Prince Miloš Obrenović (1780–1860).
	Kralja Milana	44.810743°N 20.462237°E	Terazije, Pioneers Park, Andrićev Venac, London, Cvetni Trg, Manjež, Slavija	Main street of Belgrade. Location of the Presidency of the Republic of Serbia and Belgrade City Hall, both of which are former royal courts: Novi Dvor and Stari Dvor. Named after King Milan Obrenović (1854–1901).
	Nemanjina	44.807812°N 20.456835°E	Savamala, Bara Venecija, Park Gavrilo Princip, Manjež, Slavija	Since the construction of the Belgrade Main railway station at the beginning of the street in 1884, one of the city's main traffic routes. Location of numerous state institutions: Government of the Republic of Serbia, numerous ministries, in 1999 damaged Building of the General Staff, Supreme Court, etc. In time, its name became a metonym for the Government of the Republic of Serbia. Named after Grand Župan Stefan Nemanja (1114–1200).
	Skadarlija	44.816652°N 20.463570°E	Republic Square, Skadarlija, Stari Grad	Vintage street and a pedestrian, bohemian quarter, Belgrade's version of Parisian Montmartre. After the Belgrade Fortress, the street paved with kaldrma and known for numerous old kafanas is the second most visited tourist attraction in Belgrade. Named after the city of Skadar.
	Vojvode Stepe	44.787131°N 20.466317°E	Autokomanda, Voždovac, Trošarina, Stepa Stepanović, Torlak, Kumodraž	Long, for traffic important street. Named after vojvoda Stepa Stepanović (1856–1929).

=== Major squares ===
Image	Name	Location	Streets	Notes
	Autokomanda	44.787627°N 20.465861°E	Tabanovačka, Vojvode Stepe, Bulevar Oslobođenja, Dr Milutina Ivkovića, Ljutice Bogdana	Major traffic spot, extending into the large interchange on the Belgrade-Niš highway.
	Bogoslovija	44.815162°N 20.491643°E	Mije Kovačevića, Dragoslava Srejovića, Severni Bulevar	Important traffic hub, close to the Pančevo Bridge and terminus for many public transportation bus lines. Location of the Omladinski Stadium, Military Medical Center and the University of Belgrade Faculty of Theology, hence the name (bogoslovija, seminary).
	Cvetni Trg	44.805501°N 20.465450°E	Kralja Milana, Svetozara Markovića, Njegoševa	In time lost its traffic square function. Location of the first modern supermarket in the Balkans. Contains a pedunculate oak, protected since 1980 and estimated to be over 200 years old.
	Nikola Pašić Square	44.812705°N 20.462972°E	Bulevar Kralja Aleksandra, Pioneers Park, Dečanska, Vlajkovićeva, Dragoslava Jovanovića, Terazije	In Socialist period called Square of Marx and Engels. Location of the Dom Sindikata, a monument to Nikola Pašić, large fountain and the House of the National Assembly of Serbia.
	Republic Square	44.816241°N 20.460338°E	Vasina, Francuska, Bulevar Despota Stefana, Kolarčeva, Makedonska, Dositejeva, Čika Ljubina, Knez Mihailova	Before the World War II known as the Theatre Square as it is the location of the National Theatre in Belgrade. Also a location of the National Museum of Serbia, Prince Mihailo Monument, fountains and "Staklenac" shopping mall. One section named Plateau of Dr. Zoran Đinđić.
	Slavija	44.807812°N 20.456835°E	Beogradska, Kralja Milana, Nemanjina, Deligradska, Bulevar Oslobođenja, Svetog Save, Makenzijeva	One of the major commercial junctions, previously known as the Square of Dimitrije Tucović. Location of Slavija hotels. A large fountain was added in 2017.
	Studentski Trg	44.818976°N 20.457551°E	Braće Jugovića, Zmaja od Noćaja, Vasina, Vuka Karadžića, Uzun Mirkova, Višnjićeva, Academy Park	Engulfs the Academy Park. Location of the numerous cultural and educational edifices
	Terazije	44.813506°N 20.460799°E	Kolarčeva, Knez Mihailova, Prizrenska, Nušićeva, Dragoslav Jovanovića, Kralja Milana, Nikola Pašić Square	Central city square, designated center of the city. With numerous architectural changes, it lost the square function and was elongated into the street. Location of the hotels Moskva, Balkan and Kasina, Terazije Theatre and the first skyscraper on the Balkans, the Palace Albanija from 1940.

== Legend ==
Serbian Latin	Serbian Cyrillic	English
autoput (Note: Grammatically correct version is auto-put (ауто-пут), but the Statistical Sector of the Belgrade City's Administrative Secretariat is ignoring this rule)	аутопут	motorway
bulevar	булевар	boulevard
ćošak	ћошак	corner
deo	део	part
drum	друм	open road
kej	кеј	quay
magistrala	магистрала	highway
obala	обала	bank
nova	нова	new street
pjaceta	пјацета	mini square
plato	плато	plateau
prilaz	прилаз	access path
prolaz	пролаз	passage
put	пут	road
red	ред	row
skver	сквер	small square
sokače	сокаче	short alley
sokak	сокак	alley
staza	стаза	path
šetalište	шеталиште	promenade
trg	трг	square
ulica	улица	street
venac	венац	circular street

== List of streets ==
Alphabetical list of streets in Belgrade:

== A ==
Street	Original name	Municipality	Neighborhood	Named after
Abebe Bikile	Абебе Бикиле	Zemun	Altina	Ethiopian marathon runner Abebe Bikila (1932–1973)
Aberdareva	Абердарева	Palilula	Tašmajdan	Politician and philosopher Milan Kujundžić Aberdar (1842–1893)
Ace Joksimovića	Аце Јоксимовића	Čukarica	Repište, Žarkovo, Cerak, Košutnjak	Combatant Aleksandar Aca Joksimović (1925–1942)
Ace Simića	Аце Симића	Čukarica	Sunčani Breg	Photo journalist Aleksandar Simić (1898–1971)
Ada Ciganlija	Ада Циганлија	Čukarica	Ada Ciganlija	Island of Ada Ciganlija
Ada Ciganlija-Kamp Partizan	Ада Циганлија-Камп Партизан	Čukarica	Ada Ciganlija	Facilities of the Partizan Rowing Club
Ada Huja	Ада Хуја	Palilula	Rospi Ćuprija	Ada Huja Peninsula (cf. Put za Ada Huju)
Ada Huja-Ostrvo	Ада Хуја-Острво	Palilula	Paradajz	Island of Paradajz
Adama Bogosavljevića	Адама Богосављевића	New Belgrade	Ledine	National tribune and politician Adam Bogosavljević (1843–1880)
Admirala Geprata	Адмирала Гепрата	Savski Venac	Savamala	French admiral Émile Paul Amable Guépratte (1856–1939)
Admirala Vukovića	Адмирала Вуковића	Voždovac	Voždovac	Admiral Janko Vuković (1871–1918)
Admiralska	Адмиралска	Zemun	Novi Grad, Vojni Put I	Admiral (military rank)
Ađutantska	Ађутантска	Zemun	Novi Grad, Vojni Put II	Aide-de-camp (military rank; ađutant)
Adžine Livade	Аџине ливаде	Rakovica	Kanarevo Brdo	Local toponymy Adžine Livade
Aerodromska	Аеродромска	Zemun	Batajnica	Batajnica Airport
Agaruška	Агарушка	Rakovica	Miljakovac III	Agarum, local storage object dug into the hill
Agate Kristi	Агате Кристи	Palilula	Krnjača, Blok Sutjeska	British crime and mystery author Agatha Christie (1890–1976)
Ahmeda Ademovića	Ахмеда Адемовића	Zvezdara	Orlovsko Naselje	Military trumpeter Ahmed Ademović (1873–1965)
Ajdanovačka	Ајдановачка	Zemun	Vojni Put II	Ajdanovac Monastery
Ajzenštajnova	Ајзенштајнова	Čukarica	Žarkovo	Russian film director Sergei Eisenstein (1898–1948)
Akademika Mihaila Markovića	Академика Михаила Марковића	Zvezdara	Zvezdara	Philosopher Mihailo Marković (1923–2010)
Akademska	Академска	Zemun	Donji Grad	Numerous educational objects in the vicinity
Akira Kurosave	Акира Куросаве	Zemun	Altina	Japanese film director Akira Kurosawa (1910–1998)
Akrobate Aleksića	Акробате Алексића	Zemun	Zemun Polje, Kamendin	Acrobat and daredevil Dragoljub Aleksić (1910–85); (cf. Dragoljuba Aleksića)
Alana Tjuringa	Алана Тјуринга	Rakovica	Miljakovački Vinogradi	Mathematician and computer scientist Alan Turing (1912–1954)
Alaska	Алacка	Zemun	Gornji Grad	River fishermen (craft)
Albanske Spomenice	Албанске споменице	Palilula	Hadžipopovac	Albanian Commemorative Medal, instituted in 1920
Albera Kamija	Албера Kамија	Palilula	Krnjača, Blok Sutjeska	French writer Albert Camus (1913–1960)
Alberta Ajnštajna	Алберта Ајнштајна	Palilula	Višnjica	German-American scientist Albert Einstein (1879–1955)
Albrehta Direra	Албрехта Дирера	New Belgrade	Ledine	German artist Albrecht Dürer (1471–1528)
Aleksandra Belića	Александра Белића	Zvezdara	Mirijevo IV	Linguist Aleksandar Belić (1876–1960)
Aleksandra Borodina	Александра Бородина	New Belgrade	Bežanija	Russian composer Alexander Borodin (1833-1887)
Aleksandra Bugarskog	Александра Бугарског	Zvezdara	Mirijevo III	Architect Aleksandar Bugarski (1835–1891)
Aleksandra Deroka	Александра Дерока	Zvezdara	Zeleno Brdo	Architect and artist Aleksandar Deroko (1894–1988); (cf. Braće Deroko)
Aleksandra Dime	Александра Диме	Palilula	Krnjača, Blok Sutjeska	French writer Alexandre Dumas (1802–1870)
Aleksandra Dubčeka	Александра Дубчека	Zemun	Donji Grad, Retenzija	Slovak politician Alexander Dubček (1921–1992)
Aleksandra Đokića	Александра Ђокића	New Belgrade	Ledine	Architect Aleksandar Đokić (1936-2002)
Aleksandra Đorđevića	Александра Ђорђевића	Čukarica	Cerak	TV and film director Aleksandar Đorđević (1924–2005)
Aleksandra Fleminga	Александра Флеминга	Zvezdara	Ćalije	British scientist Alexander Fleming (1881–1955)
Aleksandra Gavrića	Александра Гаврића	Zemun	Batajnica	Actor Aleksandar Gavrić (1932-1972)
Aleksandra Glišića	Александра Глишића	Savski Venac	Savamala, Bara Venecija	Army officer Aleksandar Glišić (1873–1912)
Aleksandra Makedonskog	Александра Македонског	Zemun	Batajnica, Šangaj	Greek ruler and military leader Alexander the Great (356 BC–323 BC) (cf. Aleksandra Velikog)
Aleksandra Nevskog	Александра Невског	Rakovica	Sunčani Breg	Russian prince Alexander Nevsky (1221–1263)
Aleksаndra Pavlovića	Александра Павловића	Zemun	Batajnica	Croatian war combatant Aleksandar Pavlović (1971-1991)
Aleksandra Petrovića	Александра Петровића	Zemun	Altina	Film director Aleksandar Petrović (1929–1994)
Aleksandra Popovića	Александра Поповића	Zemun	Altina	Dramatist Aleksandar Popović (1929–1996)
Aleksandra Sandića	Александра Сандића	Palilula	Krnjača, Blok Zage Malivuk	Philosopher and academic Aleksandar Sandić (1836–1908)
Aleksandra Solženjicina	Александра Солжењицина	Rakovica	Resnik	Russian writer Aleksandr Solzhenitsyn (1918–2008)
Aleksandra Stambolijskog	Александра Стамболијског	Savski Venac	Dedinje, Diplomatska Kolonija	Bulgarian politician Aleksandar Stamboliyski (1879–1923)
Aleksandra Stojanovića	Александра Стојановића	Zemun	Vojni Put II	Movie producer Aleksandar Stojanović (1939-1990)
Aleksandra Sunturlića	Александра Сунтурлића	Voždovac	Jajinci	Developer of the scouting Aleksandar Sunturlić (1952-2015)
Aleksandra Tjanića	Александра Тијанића	New Belgrade	Block 30	Journalist Aleksandar Tijanić (1949–2013)
Aleksandra Tirnanića Tirketa	Александра Тирнанића Тиркета	Savski Venac	Dedinje	Footballer Aleksandar Tirnanić (1910–1992)
Aleksandra Tomaševića	Александра Томашевића	Zvezdara	Staro Mirijevo (Mirijevo I)	Painter Aleksandar Tomašević (1921–1968)
Aleksandra Velikog	Александра Великог	Palilula	Krnjača, Blok Sava Kovačević	Greek ruler and military leader Alexander the Great (356 BC–323 BC) (cf. Aleksandra Makedonskog)
Aleksandra Vojinovića	Александра Војиновића	Rakovica	Resnik	Combatant, general and author Aleksandar Vojinović (1922–1999)
Aleksandra Vuča	Александра Вуча	New Belgrade	Ledine	Author Aleksandar Vučo (1897–1985)
Aleksandrovačka	Александровачка	Palilula	Krnjača, Dunavski Venac	Town of Aleksandrovac
Alekse Bačvanskog	Алексе Бачванског	Savski Venac	Dedinje	Actor and director Aleksa Bačvanski (1832–1881)
Alekse Dundića	Алексе Дундића	New Belgrade	Bežanija	Revolutionary Aleksa Dundić (1896–1920)
Alekse Markišića	Алексе Маркишића	Zemun	Vojni Put I	World War II combatant Aleksa Markišić (1908-1942)
Alekse Nenadovića	Алексе Ненадовића	Vračar	Slavija, Englezovac, Krunski Venac	Obor-knez Aleksa Nenadović (1749–1804)
Alekse Šantića	Алексе Шантића	Stari Grad	Stari Grad	Poet Aleksa Šantić (1868–1924)
Alekse Žujovića	Алексе Жујовића	New Belgrade	Dr Ivan Ribar	Politician Aleksa Žujović (1866-1951)
Aleksinačka	Алексиначка	Voždovac	Šumice	Town of Aleksinac
Aleksinačkih Rudara	Алексиначких рудара	New Belgrade	Block 11	92 miners killed in the 1989 disaster at Aleksinački Rudnik
Alfreda Nobela	Алфреда Нобела	Zemun	Zemun Polje	Swedish chemist and philanthropist Alfred Nobel (1833–1896)
Alibunarska	Алибунарска	Paliula	Dunavski Venac	Town of Alibunar
Alimpija Vasiljevića	Алимпија Васиљевића	Zemun	Plavi Horizonti	Philosopher and politician Alimpije Vasiljević (1831–1911)
Aljehinova	Аљехинова	Čukarica	Cerak Vinogradi, Filmski Grad	Russian-French chess player Alexander Alekhine (1892–1946)
Alojza Šmausa	Алојза Шмауса	Rakovica	Resnik	Slavist Alois Schmaus (1901–1970)
Alpskih Ruža	Алпских ружа	Palilula	Krnjača, Dunavski Venac	Alpine rose (flower)
Amadova	Амадова	Zemun	Altina	Brazilian writer Jorge Amado (1912–2001)
Amelije Erhart	Амелије Ерхарт	Palilula	Krnjača, Dunavski Venac	Aviation pioneer Amelia Earhart (1897–1937)
Anastasa Jovanovića	Анастаса Јовановића	Vračar	Pašino Brdo	Photographer Anastas Jovanović (1817–1899)
Anastasije Spasić	Анастасије Спасић	Čukarica	Stari Železnik	Philanthropist and humanitarian Anastasija Naka Spasić (1864–1953)
Andre Jovića	Андре Јовића	Rakovica	Miljakovac III	Pioneer of Olympism Andrija Jović (1877–1945)
Andre Đorđevića	Андре Ђорђевића	Palilula	Višnjička Banja	Jurist and politician Andra Đorđević (1854–1914)
Andre Nikolića	Андре Николића	Savski Venac	Senjak	Politician Andra Nikolić (1853–1918)
Andre Stevanovića	Андре Стевановића	Zvezdara	Padina	Architect Andra Stevanović (1859–1929)
Andreја Andrejevića	Андреја Андрејевића	Zvezdara	Veliki Mokri Lug	Art historian Andrej Andrejević (1935–1991)
Andreја Mitrovića	Андреја Митровића	Palilula	Krnjača, Dunavski Venac	Historian Andrej Mitrović (1937–2013)
Andreја Tarkovskog	Андреја Тарковског	New Belgrade	Ledine	Russian film director Andrei Tarkovsky (1932–1986)
Andreја Vitruka	Андреја Витрука	Palilula	Krnjača, Blok Sutjeska	Soviet air force general Andrey Vitruk (1902–1946) (cf. Vitrukova)
Andreje Damjanovića	Андреје Дамјановића	New Belgrade	Ledine	Church architect Andreja Damjanović (1813-1878)
Andreјe Pregera	Андреје Прегера	Palilula	Krnjača, Kotež	Pianist Andreja Preger (1912–2015)
Andrije Habuša	Андрије Хабуша	Zemun	Zemun Polje	Resistance member Andrija Habuš (1915–1942)
Andrije Vukovića	Андрије Вуковића	New Belgrade	Ledine	Engineer and architect Andrija Vuković (1812-1884)
Andrijevička	Андријевичка	Rakovica	Resnik	Town of Andrijevica, Montenegro
Andrićev Venac	Андрићев венац	Stari Grad	Andrićev Venac	Writer Ivo Andrić (1892–1975)
Anđelije Stančić	Анђелије Станчић	Čukarica	Stari Železnik	Teacher, writer and volunteer Anđelija Stančić (1865–1955)
Ane Ahmatove	Ане Ахматове	Čukarica	Cerak Vinogradi	Russian poet Anna Akhmatova (1889–1966)
Ane Bešlić	Ане Бешлић	New Belgrade	Dr Ivan Ribar	Sculptor Ana Bešlić (1912-2008)
Ane Dobeš	Ане Добеш	Voždovac	Jajinci	Resistance member Ana Dobeš (1906–1944)
Ane Frank	Ане Франк	Palilula	Nova Karaburma	Dutch Holocaust victim Anne Frank (1929–1945)
Ane Glinskaje Jakšić	Ане Глинскаје Јакшић	Voždovac	Jajinci	Noblewoman Ana Jakšić (1473-1553)
Anete Andrejević	Анете Андрејевић	Zemun	Grmeč	World War II combatant Jelisaveta Andrejević Aneta (1923-1943)
Anice Savić Rebac	Анице Савић Ребац	Palilula	Višnjička Banja	Writer and translator Anica Savić Rebac (1892–1953)
Anke Matić	Анке Матић	Palilula	Kotež	Combatant Anka Matić (1918–1944)
Anke Matić	Анке Матић	Zemun	Zemun Polje	doubled name; see above
Anke Obrenović	Анке Обреновић	Čukarica	Stari Železnik	Translator and royal house member Princess Anka Obrenović (1821–1868)
Anke Stojilović	Анке Стојиловић	Palilula	Krnjača, Blok Zaga Malivuk	Midwife and humanitarian Anka Stojilović (mid-19th century)
Anri Matisa	Анри Матиса	New Belgrade	Ledine	French painter Henri Matisse (1869–1954)
Anrija Žamea	Анрија Жамеа	Palilula	Rospi Ćuprija	French doctor Henri Jammet (1920–1996)
Ante Abramovića	Анте Абрамовића	Čukarica	Stari Železnik	Painter Ante Abramović (1903–1985)
Ante Bogićevića	Анте Богићевића	Zvezdara	Zvezdara	Rebel Anta Bogićević (1758–1813)
Ante Čolaka	Анте Чолака	Čukarica	Resnik	Rebel Antonije Simeonović "Čolak-Anta" (1777–1853) (cf. Čolak Antina)
Ante Lambaše	Анте Ламбаше	Čukarica	Žarkovo, Rupčine	Water sports pioneer Ante Lambaša (1918–1993)
Antifašističke Borbe	Антифашистичке борбе	New Belgrade	Ušće, Blocks 21–26 and 42–43, Savski Nasip	Antifascist rebellion 1941–1945
Antona Aškerca	Антона Ашкерца	Čukarica	Stari Cerak	Slovene poet Anton Aškerc (1856–1912)
Antona Čehova	Антона Чехова	Rakovica	Kneževac	Russian writer Anton Chekhov (1860–1904)
Antona Klemenčića	Антона Клеменчића	Zemun	Zemun Polje	Slovene Resistance member Anton Klemenčić (1901-1941)
Antonija Pantovića	Антонија Пантовића	Rakovica	Resnik	Mayor Antonije Pantović
Antonije Javornik	Антоније Јаворник	Zvezdara	Veliki Mokri Lug	Nurse and combatant Antonija Javornik (1893–1974) (cf. Natalije Bjelajac)
Apatinska	Апатинска	Zemun	Sava Kovačević	Town of Apatin
Apisova	Аписова	Zvezdara	Zeleno Brdo	Army officer and conspirator Dragutin Dimitrijević Apis (1876–1917)
Aradska	Арадска	Zrenjanin	Cvetko	City of Arad, Romania
Aranđelovačka	Аранђеловачка	Voždovac	Siva Stena	Town of Aranđelovac
Arčibalda Rajsa	Арчибалда Рајса	Čukarica	Žarkovo, Košutnjak, Filmski Grad	Swiss criminologist Archibald Reiss (1875–1929)
Arhiepiskopa Danila	Архиепископа Данила	Palilula	Tašmajdan	Archbishop and writer Danilo II (1270–1337)
Arhimandrita Gerasima Zelića	Архимандрита Герасима Зелића	Čukarica	Žarkovo, Košutnjak	Archimandrite and writer Gerasim Zelić (1752–1828)
Arhitekte Ilkića	Архитекте Илкића	Rakovica	Miljakovački Izvori	Architect Jovan Ilkić (1857–1917) (cf. Jovana Ilkića)
Ariljačka	Ариљачка	Zvezdara	Zeleno Brdo	Village of Ariljača
Ariljska	Ариљска	Zvezdara	Zeleno Brdo	Town of Arilje
Astana	Астана	Savski Venac	Lisičji Potok	City of Astana, Kazakhstan
Astronomska	Астрономска	Zvezdara	Zvezdara II	Belgrade Observatory
Atanasija Nikolića	Атанасија Николића	Zemun	Plavi Horizonti	Educator Atanasije Nikolić (1803–1882)
Atanasija Pulje	Атанасија Пуље	Zemun	Železnička Kolonija, Novi Grad	Dentist Atanasije Puljo (1878–1944)
Atika	Атика	Voždovac	Jajinci	Attica Peninsula, Greece
Atinska	Атинска	Savski Venac	Dedinje	City of Athens, Greece
Atlantska	Атлантска	Čukarica	Dunavski Venac	Atlantic Ocean
Augusta Šenoe	Аугуста Шеное	Palilula	Kotež	Croatian writer August Šenoa (1838–1881)
Autoput Beograd-Ostružnica	Аутопут Београд-Остружница	Čukarica	Čukarička Padina, Žarkovo, Železnik	Motorway Belgrade-Ostružnica
Autoput za Niš	Аутопут ѕа Ниш	Voždovac, Zvezdara	Konjarnik, Medaković III, Mali Mokri Lug, Veliki Mokri Lug	Motorway Belgrade-Niš (section of European route E75)
Autoput za Novi Sad	Аутопут за Нови Сад	Zemun	Kolonija Zmaj, Novi Grad, Vojni Put I-II, Altina, Bački Ilovik, Gornji Grad, Mala Pruga, Galenika, Nova Galenika, Kamendin, Zemun Polje, Batajnica	Motorway Belgrade-Novi Sad
Autoput za Zagreb	Аутопут за Загреб	New Belgrade, Zemun	Studentski Grad, Tošin Bunar, Bežanijska Kosa; Franjine Rudine, Kolonija Zmaj	Motorway Belgrade-Zagreb (section of European route E70)
Avalska	Авалска	Čukarica	Železnik, Stari Železnik	Avala mountain
Avalskog Venca	Авалског Венца	Voždovac	Jajinci	same as the above
Avde Karabegovića	Авде Карабеговића	Vračar	Pašino Brdo	Poet Avdo Karabegović (1878–1908)
Avijatičara	Авијатичара	Palilula	Krnjača, Blok Sutjeska	Airmen (in general)
Avijatičarski Put	Авијатичарски пут	New Belgrade	Block 9-A	Former aircraft factory "Ikarbus" ("Airmen's Road")
Avrama Levića	Аврама Левића	Rakovica	Sunčani Breg	Economist Avram Lević (1869–1941)
Avrama Petronijevića	Аврама Петронијевића	Zvezdara	Mali Mokri Lug	Politician Avram Petronijević (1791–1852)
Avrama Vinavera	Аврама Винавера	Palilula	Krnjača, Partizanski Blok	Doctor Avram Vinaver (1862–1915)
Azanjska	Азањска	Paliula	Dunavski Venac	Village of Azanja

== C ==
Street	Original name	Municipality	Neighborhood	Named after
Camblakova	Цамблакова	Voždovac	Siva Stena	Bulgarian writer Gregory Tsamblak (1365–1420)
Cankareva	Цанкарева	Voždovac	Dušanovac	Slovene author Ivan Cankar (1876–1918)
Cara Dušana	Цара Душана	Stari Grad	Kalemegdan, Dorćol, Skadarlija	Emperor Dušan (1308–1355)
Cara Dušana	Цара Душана	Zemun	Muhar, Gardoš, Ćukovac	doubled name; see above
Cara Iraklija	Цара Ираклија	Savski Venac	Dedinje, Topčidersko Brdo	Byzantine emperor Heraclius (575–641)
Cara Jovana Crnog	Цара Јована Црног	Zvezdara	Lion	Military commander Jovan Nenad (1492–1527)
Cara Justinijana Prvog	Цара Јустинијана Првог	Voždovac	Šumice	Byzantine emperor Justinian I (482–565)
Cara Konstantina	Цара Константина	Zemun	Grmeč	Roman emperor Constantine the Great (272-337)
Cara Lazara	Цара Лазара	Stari Grad	Kosančićev Venac	Prince Lazar Hrebeljanović (1329–1389)
Cara Nikolaja II	Цара Николаја II	Vračar	Čubura, Gradić Pejton, Kalenić, Crveni Krst	Emperor Nicholas II of Russia (1868–1918); (cf. Cara Romanova)
Cara Radovana	Цара Радована	Rakovica	Sunčani Breg	Work Tsar Radovan's Treasure (1932) by Jovan Dučić
Cara Romanova	Цара Романова	Rakovica	Miljakovac III	Emperor Nicholas II of Russia (1868–1918); (cf. Cara Nikolaja II)
Cara Uroša	Цара Уроша	Stari Grad	Kalemegdan, Dorćol	Emperor Uroš (1336–1371)
Carice Jelene	Царице Јелене	Zemun	Batajnica	Empress Jelena (1310–1376)
Carice Milice	Царице Милице	Stari Grad	Zeleni Venac, Obilićev Venac, Varoš Kapija	Princess Milica (1335–1405)
Carigradska	Цариградска	Stari Grad	Jevremovac, Stari Grad	City of Tsarigrad, Turkey (modern Istanbul)
Cavtatska	Цавтатска	Voždovac	Marinkova Bara	Town of Cavtat, Croatia
Celjska	Цељска	Vračar	Čubura	Town of Celje, Slovenia
Cerova	Церова	Čukarica	Cerak Vinogradi	Turkey oak (tree)
Cerska	Церска	Vračar	Čubura, Crveni Krst	Cer mountain
Cerska	Церска	Zemun	Novi Grad	doubled name; see above
Cerska	Церска	Čukarica	Stari Železnik	tripled name; see above
Cerski Prolaz	Церски пролаз	Vračar	Čubura	Cerska Street ("Cerska passage")
Cerski Venac	Церски венац	Čukarica	Cerak Vinogradi, Cerak II	Neighborhood of Cerak
Cetinjska	Цетињска	Stari Grad	Skadarlija, Stari Grad	Town of Cetinje, Montenegro
Cetinjska	Цетињска	Zemun	Ćukovac	doubled name; see above
Cetinjska	Цетињска	Čukarica	Novi Železnik	tripled name; see above
Cice Kalušević	Цице Калушевић	Voždovac	Jajinci	Athlete and basketball player Cmiljka Kalušević (1933–1989)
Cige Milenkovića	Циге Миленковића	Zemun	Batajnica	Actor Branislav Ciga Milenković (1931-2005)
Cincar Jankova	Цинцар Јанкова	Stari Grad	Kalemegdan, Dorćol	Rebel Cincar Janko Popović (1779–1833)
Cocina	Цоцина	Zvezdara	Zvezdara II	?
Crepajska	Црепајска	Palilula	Dunavski Venac	Village of Crepaja
Crikvenička	Цриквеничка	Voždovac	Marinkova Bara	Town of Crikvenica, Croatia
Crkvište	Црквиште	Palilula	Krnjača, Ovčanski Sebeš	?
Crnoborska	Црноборска	Voždovac	Kumodraž, Torlak	?
Crnog Bora	Црног бора	Palilula	Krnjača, Dunavski Venac	Black pine trees (in general)
Crnog Duda	Црног дуда	Zemun	Save Kovačevića	Black mulberry (tree)
Crnogorska	Црногорска	Voždovac	Savamala	Montenegro (state)
Crnogorska	Црногорска	Zemun	Sava Kovačević	doubled name; see above
Crnojevića	Црнојевића	Rakovica	Košutnjak, Rakovica	Crnojević dynasty
Crnomorska	Црноморска	New Belgrade	Bežanijska Kosa	Black Sea
Crnotravska	Црнотравска	Savski Venac, Voždovac	Banjica	Village of Crna Trava
Crvena Zvezda	Црвена звезда	Zvezdara	Mali Mokri Lug	Local football team
Crvenih Dudova	Црвених дудова	Palilula	Rospi Ćuprija	Red mulberry trees (in general)
Crvenih Hrastova	Црвених храстова	Čukarica	Cerak Vinogradi, Vidikovac	Red oak trees (in general)
Crvenih Javorova	Црвених јаворова	Zemun	Vojni Put I	Red maple (tree)
Crveno Barjače	Црвено барјаче	Čukarica	Bele Vode	Socialist unrest Crveno barjače (1876)
Cvećarska	Цвећарска	Čukarica	Žarkovo	?
Cvetanova Ćuprija	Цветанова ћуприја	Zvezdara	Medaković III, Veliki Mokri Lug, Cvetanova Ćuprija	?
Cvetna	Цветна	Voždovac	Kumodraž	Flowers (in general)
Cvetna	Цветна	Zemun	Zemun	doubled name; see above
Cvijete Zuzorić	Цвијете Зузорић	Palilula	Krnjača, Blok Branko Momirov	Ragusan poet and socialite Cvijeta Zuzorić (1552–1648)
Cvijićeva	Цвијићева	Palilula, Stari Grad	Viline Vode, Profesorska Kolonija, Hadžipopovac, Stara Palilula	Geographer Jovan Cvijić (1865–1927)
Cvijićeva	Цвијићева	Zemun	Železnička Kolonija	doubled name; see above

== Č ==
Street	Original name	Municipality	Neighborhood	Named after
Čačanska	Чачанска	Zvezdara	Učiteljsko Naselje	Town of Čačak
Čajetinska	Чајетинска	Palilula	Rospi Ćuprija	Municipality of Čajetina
Čajnička	Чајничка	Rakovica	Labudovo Brdo, Petlovo Brdo	Town of Čajniče, Bosnia and Herzegovina
Čakorska	Чакорска	Savski Venac	Dedinje	Čakor mountain, Montenegro
Čamdžijina	Чамџијина	Čukarica	Banovo Brdo	?
Čamurlijska	Чамурлијска	Zemun	Vojni Put II	Village of Čamurlija
Čardaklijina	Чардаклијина	Zvezdara	Učiteljsko Naselje	Diplomat Petar Čardaklija (d. 1808)
Čarlija Čaplina	Чарлија Чаплина	Palilula	Profesorska Kolonija, Hadžipopovac, Bogoslovija	English actor Charlie Chaplin (1889–1977)
Čarobne Frule	Чаробне фруле	Zvezdara	Mirijevo III	Mozart's opera The magic flute (1791)
Časlava Veljića	Часлава Вељића	Čukarica	Rupčine	Kayaker Časlav Veljić (1930–2008)
Čazmanska	Чазманска	Voždovac	Marinkova Bara	Town of Čazma, Croatia
Čavketov Pasaž	Чавкетов пасаж	Stari Grad	Bezistan	Rock drummer Goran Čavajda "Čavke" (1962–1997)
Čede Zlatanovića	Чеде Златановића	Čukarica	Stari Železnik	Železnik municipal president Čeda Zlatanović (1927–2008)
Čede Mijatovića	Чеде Мијатовића	Zvezdara	Lion	Politician and diplomat Čedomilj Mijatović (1842–1932)
Čede Minderovića	Чеде Миндеровића	Zvezdara	Lion	Writer Čedomir Minderović (1912–1966)
Čedomilja M. Todorovića	Чедомиља М. Тодоровића	Voždovac	Mitrovo Brdo	Historian Čedomilj M. Todorović (1875–????)
Čedomilja Mitrovića	Чедомиља Митровића	Zvezdara	Padina	Law professor Čedomilj Mitrović (1870–1934)
Čedomira Krstića	Чедомира Крстића	Zemun	Altina	Painter Čedomir Krstić (1923-1988)
Čedomira Mirkovića	Чедомира Мирковића	Palilula	Krnjača, Kotež	Writer Čedomir Mirković (1944–2005)
Čedomira Popova	Чедомира Попова	Čukarica	Žarkovo, Rupčine	Historian Čedomir Popov (1936–2012)
Čedomira Simića	Чедомира Симића	Palilula	Krnjača, Partizanski Blok	Veterinarian Čedomir Simić (1896–1969)
Čegarska	Чегарска	Zvezdara	Bulbulder	Battle of Čegar (1809)
Čelebićka	Челебићка	Rakovica	Miljakovac	Village of Čelebići, Bosnia and Herzegovina
Čelopečka	Челопечка	Zvezdara	Vukov Spomenik	Battle of Čelopek (1905)
Čemernička	Чемерничка	Voždovac	Pašino Brdo	Čemernica mountain
Černiševskog	Чернишевског	Vračar	Čubura	Russian philosopher and socialist Nikolay Chernyshevsky (1828–1889)
Česmica	Чесмица	Zvezdara	Veliki Mokri Lug	?
Četvrtog Sremskog Bataljona	Четвртог сремског батаљона	Zemun	Novi Grad	Fourth Syrmian Battalion (World War II)
Češka	Чешка	New Belgrade	Ledine	Czech Republic (state)
Četinarska	Четинарска	Palilula	Višnjica	Conifer trees (in general)
Čiča Ilijina	Чича Илијина	Zvezdara	Đeram	Actor Čiča Ilija Stanojević (1859-1930)
Čiče Romanijskog	Чиче Романијског	Palilula	Stara Karaburma	Combatant Slaviša Vajner Čiča (1903–1942)
Čičina	Чичина	Rakovica	Resnik, Avala Grad	Commander Pavle Mladenović (d. 1905)
Čika Ljubina	Чика Љубина	Stari Grad	Republic Square, Studentski Trg	Author Ljubomir Nenadović (1826–1895)
Čika Miše Đurića	Чика Мише Ђурића	Palilula	Ćalije	Classicist Miloš N. Đurić (1892–1967)
Čingrijina	Чингријина	Zvezdara	Zvezdara	Politician Pero Čingrija (1837–1921)
Čkaljino Sokače	Чкаљино сокаче	Savski Venac	West Vračar	Actor Miodrag Petrović Čkalja (1924–2003); (cf. Miodraga Petrovića Čkalje)
Čolak Antina	Чолак Антина	Savski Venac	Senjak	Rebel Antonije Simeonović "Čolak-Anta" (1777–1853) (cf. Ante Čolaka)
Čubrina	Чубрина	Stari Grad	Kosančićev Venac	Poet Sima Milutinović Sarajlija (1791–1847)
Čuburska	Чубурска	Vračar	Čubura, Gradić Pejton	Neighborhood of Čubura
Čučuk Stanina	Чучук Станина	Zvezdara	Zvezdara	Rebel Čučuk Stana (1795–1849)
Čukarička	Чукаричка	Čukarica	Banovo Brdo	Neighborhood of Čukarica
Čumićeva	Чумићева	Stari Grad	Terazije	Politician Aćim Čumić (1836–1901); better known as Čumićevo Sokače
Čunarska	Чунарска	Zemun	Gardoš, Zemunski Kej	Boat making (craft)

== Ć ==
Street	Original name	Municipality	Neighborhood	Named after
Ćilibara	Ћилибара	Palilula	Krnjača, Blok Sava Kovačević	Amber (gemstone)
Ćipikova	Ћипикова	Zvezdara	Cvetko	Writer Ivo Ćipiko (1869–1923)
Ćirila i Metodija	Ћирила и Методија	Zvezdara	Vukov Spomenik	Christian missionaries Saints Cyril (826–869) and Methodius (815–885)
Ćira Daskalovića	Ћира Даскаловића	Rakovica	Resnik	Military officer Ćiro Daskalović (World War I)
Ćukovačka	Ћуковачка	Zemun	Ćukovac	Neighborhood of Ćukovac
Ćukovački Kut	Ћуковачки кут	Zemun	Ćukovac	same as the above ("Ćukovac corner")
Ćukovački Rub	Ћуковачки руб	Zemun	Ćukovac	same as the above ("Ćukovac edge")
Ćupričin Potok	Ћупричин поток	Rakovica	Kneževac	Locality in the neighborhood
Ćuprijska	Ћупријска	Zvezdara	Zeleno Brdo	Town of Ćuprija
Ćurčijina	Ћурчијина	Zemun	Vojni Put I	First Serbian Uprising rebel Đorđe Ćurčija (d. 1804)
Ćustendilska	Ћустендилска	Palilula	Ćalije	Town of Kyustendil, Bulgaria (cf. Velbuška)
Ćurtovo Brdo	Ћуртово брдо	Zvezdara	Staro Mirijevo	Ćurtovo Brdo, local hill

== DŽ ==
Street	Original name	Municipality	Neighborhood	Named after
Džesija Ovensa	Џесија Овенса	Zemun	Altina	U.S. athlete Jesse Owens (1913–1980)
Džona Frontinghama	Џона Фронтингхама	Rakovica	Sunčani Breg	U.S. lawyer and benefactor John Frothingham (1879–1935)
Džona Kenedija	Џона Кенедија	Zemun, New Belgrade	Paviljoni, Retenzija, Tošin Bunar	U.S. president John F. Kennedy (1917–1963)
Džordža Kenana	Џорџа Кенана	Rakovica	Miljakovac	U.S. diplomat George F. Kennan (1904–2005)
Džordža Orvela	Џорџа Орвела	Palilula	Krnjača, Blok Sutjeska	English author George Orwell (1903–1950)
Džordža Vašingtona	Џорџа Вашингтона	Stari Grad	Palilula, Kopitareva Gradina, Jevremovac, Dorćol	U.S. president George Washington (1732–1799)
Džordža Vašingtona	Џорџа Вашингтона	Zemun	Zemun	doubled name; see above

== Đ ==
Street	Original name	Municipality	Neighborhood	Named after
Đačka	Ђачка	Voždovac	Jajinci	Local elementary school ("Pupils'")
Đakona Avakuma	Ђакона Авакума	Voždovac	Dušanovac, Marinkova Bara	Saint Deacon Avakum (1794–1814)
Đakovačka	Ђаковачка	Zvezdara	Đeram	Town of Đakovo, Croatia
Đalinska	Ђалинска	Palilula	Krnjača, Dunavski Venac	Village of Đala
Đanga Rajnharta	Ђанга Рајнхарта	Zvezdara	Orlovsko Naselje	French jazz musician Django Reinhardt (1910–1953)
Đene Branovačkog	Ђене Брановачког	Čukarica	Stari Železnik	Philanthropist Evgen Đena Branovački (1841–1882)
Đenovićka	Ђеновићка	Zvezdara	Padina	Village of Đenovići, Montenegro
Đeravička	Ђеравичка	Rakovica	Kanarevo Brdo, Miljakovac	Đeravica peak, Prokletije
Đerdapska	Ђердапска	Vračar	Crveni Krst, Pašino Brdo	Đerdap Gorge
Đevđelijska	Ђевђелијска	Zvezdara	Đeram, Lion	Town of Gevgelija, Macedonia
Đoka Kovačevića	Ђока Ковачевића	Zemun	Novi Grad, Železnička Kolonija	Spanish Civil War combatant Đoko Kovačević (1912–1938)
Đoka Pavićevića	Ђока Павићевића	Palilula	Kotež	Combatant Đoko Pavićević (1872–1970)
Đoka Vojvodića	Ђока Војводића	Zvezdara	Zvezdara	Combatant Đoko Vojvodić (1914–1942)
Đoke Krstića	Ђоке Крстића	Voždovac	Pašino Brdo	Painter Đorđe Krstić (1851–1907) (cf. Đorđa Krstića)
Đorđa Andrejevića-Kuna	Ђорђа Андрејевића-Куна	Voždovac	Braće Jerković	Painter Đorđe Andrejević-Kun (1904–1964)
Đorđa Čutukovića	Ђорђа Чутуковића	Zemun	Novi Grad, Železnička Kolonija	Painter Đorđe Čutuković (1888–1976)
Đorđa Ilića	Ђорђа Илића	Zvezdara	Mali Mokri Lug	?
Đorđa Jovanovića	Ђорђа Јовановића	Stari Grad	Skadarlija	Sculptor Đorđe Jovanović (1861–1953)
Đorđa Kode	Ђорђа Коде	Čukarica	Stari Železnik	Merchant and philanthropist Đorđe Koda (1811–91)
Đorđa Kratovca	Ђорђа Кратовца	Voždovac	Dušanovac	Saint George of Kratovo (1497–1515)
Đorđa Krstića	Ђорђа Kрстића	Zvezdara	Mali Mokri Lug	Painter Đorđe Krstić (1851–1907) (cf. Đoke Krstića)
Đorđa Lobačeva	Ђорђа Лобачева	Zemun	Zemun Polje	Illustrator and comic strip artist Đorđe Lobačev (1909–2002)
Đorđa Mihailovića	Ђорђа Михаиловића	Čukarica	Stari Železnik	Physician Đorđe Mihailović (1892–1974)
Đorđa Milovanovića	Ђорђа Миловановића	Čukarica	Stari Železnik	Rebel Đorđe Milovanović (1765–1817)
Đorđa Nestorovića	Ђорђа Несторовића	Čukarica	Novi Železnik	Politician and mayor Đorđe Nestorović (1864–1935)
Đorđa Nešića	Ђорђа Нешића	Palilula	Karaburma Dunav	Ophthalmologist Đorđe Nešić (1873–1959)
Đorđa Ognjanovića	Ђорђа Oгњановића	Čukarica	Sunčana Padina	Internist Đorđe Ognjanović (1898–1957)
Đorđa Pantelića	Ђорђа Пантелића	Zemun	Kalvarija	Doctor and benefactor Đorđe Pantelić (1802–1859)
Đorđa Pavlovića	Ђорђа Павловића	Zvezdara	Staro Mirijevo	?
Đorđa Radaka	Ђорђа Радака	Čukarica	Stari Železnik	Philanthropist Đorđe Radak (1823–1906)
Đorđa Radojlovića	Ђорђа Радојловића	Savski Venac	Dedinje	Businessman and benefactor Đorđe Radojlović (1861–1929)
Đorđa Simića	Ђорђа Симића	Čukarica	Stari Železnik	Politician and diplomat Đorđe Simić (1843–1921)
Đorđa Stanojevića	Ђорђа Станојевића	New Belgrade	Belville, Delta City, Airport City	Physicist Đorđe Stanojević (1858–1921)
Đorđa Stojkovića	Ђорђа Стојковића	Čukarica	Stari Železnik	?
Đorđa Šagića	Ђорђа Шагића	Rakovica	Petlovo Brdo	Revolutionary and diplomat Đorđe Šagić (1795–1873), "first Serb in the US"
Đorđa Tasića	Ђорђа Тасића	Čukarica	Žarkovo, Repište	Legal theorist Đorđe Tasić (1892–1943)
Đorđa Vajferta	Ђорђа Вајферта	Vračar	Neimar	Industrialist and benefactor Đorđe Vajfert (1850–1937)
Đuje i Dragoljuba	Ђује и Драгољуба	Rakovica	Labudovo Brdo, Petlovo Brdo	Combatant siblings Đurđina (1924–44) and Dragoljub Aleksić (1925–1944)
Đuke Dinić	Ђуке Динић	Zvezdara	Đeram	Resistance member Đurđelina Dinić (1914–1943)
Đurđa Balšića	Ђурђа Балшића	Zemun	Batajnica	Ruler of Zeta Đurađ I Balšić (d. 1378)
Đurđa Boškovića-Bate	Ђурђа Бошковића-Бате	Zemun	Batajnica	Resistance member Đurđe Bošković
Đurđevdanska	Ђурђевданска	Voždovac	Kumodraž	Đurđevdan (Saint George's Day)
Đurđevke Čakarević	Ђурђевке Чакаревић	Voždivac	Banjica	Opera singer Đurđevka Čakarević
Đure Daničića	Ђуре Даничића	Stari Grad	Jevremovac, Kopitareva Gradina	Linguist Đuro Daničić (1825–1882)
Đure Gajića	Ђуре Гајића	Zemun	Zemun Polje	Combatant Đuro Gajić (d. 1943)
Đure Gavele	Ђуре Гавеле	Čukarica	Žarkovo, Rupčine	Writer Đuro Gavela (1907–1978)
Đure Jakšića	Ђуре Јакшића	Stari Grad	Obilićev Venac	Poet and painter Đura Jakšić (1832–1878)
Đure Kurepe	Ђуре Курепе	Zemun	Altina	Mathematician Đuro Kurepa (1907–1993)
Đure Mađerčiča	Ђуре Мађерчића	Voždovac	Voždovac, Trošarina	Resistance member Đuro Mađerčić (1922–1942)
Đurićev Prolaz	Ђурићев пролаз	Voždovac	Pašino Brdo	Mihaila Đurića Street ("Đurić passage")
Đurićeva	Ђурићева	Zvezdara	Bulbulder	?
Đušina	Ђушина	Palilula	Stara Palilula, Jevremovac	Rebel Đuša Vulićević (1771–1805)
Đuzepea Mancinija	Ђузепеа Манцинија	Zvezdara	Lion, Slavujev Potok	Italian nationalist and politician Giuseppe Mazzini (1805–1872)

== E ==
Street	Original name	Municipality	Neighborhood	Named after
Eduarda Mihela	Едуарда Михела	Čukarica	Stari Železnik	Czech-born pathologist and military medic Eduard Mihel (1864–1915)
Edvarda Griga	Едварда Грига	Rakovica	Resnik, Avala Grad	Norwegian composer Edvard Grieg (1843–1907)
Edvarda Munka	Едварда Мунка	New Belgrade	Ledine	Norwegian painter Edvard Munch (1863–1944)
Egejska	Егејска	New Belgrade	Bežanijska Kosa	Aegean Sea
Egipatska	Египатска	New Belgrade	Bežanijska Kosa, Blokovi	Egypt (country)
Elija Fincija	Елија Финција	Zemun	Kamendin	Theater critic Eli Finci (1911–1980)
Elsi Ignis	Елси Игнис	Rakovica	Miljakovac III	Scottish doctor and humanitarian Elsie Inglis (1864–1917)
Elvirina	Елвирина	Zvezdara	Mirijevo III	Donna Elvira, character from Mozart's opera Don Giovanni (1787)
Elvisa Prislija	Елвиса Прислија	Zemun	Sutjeska, Bački Ilovik	U.S. rock and roll singer Elvis Presley (1935-1977)
Emanuila Jankovića	Емануила Јанковића	Voždovac	Autokomanda	Writer and educator Emanuilo Janković (1758–1792)
Emila Zatopeka	Емила Затопека	Zemun	Altina	Czech long-distance runner Emil Zátopek (1922–2000)
Emila Zole	Емила Золе	Čukarica	Stari Cerak	French writer Émile Zola (1840–1902)
Emilijana Josimovića	Емилијана Јосимовића	Stari Grad	Republic Square	Architect Emilijan Josimović (1823–1897)
Emilije Jakšić	Емилије Јакшић	Zemun	Nova Galenika	Resistance member Emilija Jakšić (1924–1949)
Emira Dragulja	Емира Драгуља	Palilula	Lešće	Painter Emir Dragulj (1939–2002)
Endija Vorhola	Ендија Ворхола	Čukarica	Julino Brdo	U.S. pop artist Andy Warhol (1928–1987)
Enrika Josifa	Енрика Јосифа	Palilula	Rospi Ćuprija	Composer Enriko Josif (1924–2003)
Enrika Paćija	Енрика Паћија	Čukarica	Stari Železnik	Italian sculptor Enrico Pazzi (1818–1899)
Episkopa Nikolaja	Епископа Николаја	Zemun	Altina	Bishop and writer Nikolaj Velimirović (1881–1956)
Episkopa Sergeja	Епископа Сергеја	Zemun	Altina	Bishop of Belgrade (9th century)
Esad Pašina	Есад Пашина	Voždovac	Voždovac	Albanian army officer and politician Esad Pasha Toptani (1863–1920)
Eufemije Jović	Еуфемије Јовић	Čukarica	Stari Železnik	Philanthropist Eufemija Jović (1779–1861)
Eugena Savojskog	Еугена Савојског	Čukarica	Žarkovo, Rupčine	Austrian military commander Prince Eugene of Savoy (1663–1736)
Eugena Verbera	Еугена Вербера	Voždovac	Jajinci	Author, translator and actor Eugen Verber (1923–1995)
Eve Haljecke	Еве Хаљецке	Čukarica	Stari Železnik	Polish-born gynecologist and activist Eva Haljecka Petković (1870–1947)
Evelin Haverfild	Евелин Хаверфилд	Voždovac	Pašino Brdo	Scottish suffragette and humanitarian Evelina Haverfield (1867–1920)
Evgenija Dumče	Евгенија Думче	Čukarica	Stari Železnik	Merchant and philanthropist Evgenije Dumča (1838–1917)
Evropska	Европска	New Belgrade	Blokovi	Europe (continent)

== F ==
Street	Original name	Municipality	Neighborhood	Named after
Fabrički Krug Galenike	Фабрички круг Галенике	Zemun	Galenika	Pharmaceutical factory Galenika a.d.
Fabrički Put	Фабрички пут	Zemun	Altina	Local gypsum factory (factory road)
Fabrisova	Фабрисова	Savski Venac	Maleško Brdo	Journalist Antun Fabris (1864–1904)
Farmaceutska	Фармацеутска	Voždovac	Jajinci	Belgrade University Faculty of Pharmacy
Fatime Pejović	Фатиме Пејовић	Palilula	Višnjička Banja	Resistance member Fatima Pejović (d. 1941)
Feliksa Kanica	Феликса Каница	Zvezdara	Veliki Mokri Lug	German traveler Felix Kanitz (1829–1904)
Figarova	Фигарова	Zvezdara	Mirijevo III	Figaro, character from Mozart's opera The Marriage of Figaro (1786)
Filipa Hristića	Филипа Христића	Čukarica	Žarkovo, Rupčine	Politician Filip Hristić (1819–1905)
Filipa Kljajića	Филипа Кљајића	Zemun	Novi Grad	Combatant Filip Kljajić (1913–1943)
Filipa Višnjića	Филипа Вишњића	Zemun	Gornji Grad	Epic poet and guslar Filip Višnjić (1767–1834) (cf. Višnjićeva)
Finžgarova	Финжгарова	Voždovac	Medaković II	Slovene writer Franc Finžgar (1871–1962)
Fjodora Fjodoroviča Šljuge	Фјодора Фјодоровича Шљуге	Rakovica	Sunčani Breg	Russian Kosovo war volunteer Fyodor Fyodorovich Shlyuga (1963–1999)
Flore Sends	Флоре Сендс	Savski Venac	Banjica, Lisičji Potok	British army officer Flora Sandes (1876–1956)
Florina	Флорина	Voždovac	Voždovac	same as the above
Fočanska	Фочанска	Zvezdara	Zeleno Brdo	Town of Foča, Bosnia and Herzegovina
Franca Bevka	Франца Бевка	Palilula	Kotež	Slovene writer France Bevk (1890–1970)
Franca Jankea	Франца Јанкеа	Zvezdara	Mirijevo II	Slovak architect Franz Janke
Franca Kafke	Франца Кафке	Palilula	Krnjača, Blok Sutjeska	Czech writer Franz Kafka (1883–1924)
Francuska	Француска	Stari Grad	Dorćol, Republic Square, Stari Grad	France (state)
Franje Jenča	Фрање Јенча	Zemun	Kalvarija	Architect Franjo Jenč (1867-1967)
Franje Kluza	Фрање Клуза	Zvezdara	Zeleno Brdo	Pilot Franjo Kluz (1913–1944)
Franje Krča	Фрање Крча	Zemun	Zemun Poljе	Resistance member Franjo Krč (1916–1944)
Franje Mihalića	Фрање Михалића	Voždovac	Banjica II, Jajinci	Long-distance runner Franjo Mihalić (1920–2015)
Frederika Šopena	Фредерика Шопена	Voždovac	Selo Rakovica	Polish composer Frédéric Chopin (1810–1849)
Frontovska	Фронтовска	Čukarica	Žarkovo	?
Fruškogorska	Фрушкогорска	Savski Venac	Kosančićev Venac	Fruška Gora mountain
Fruškogorska	Фрушкогорска	Zemun	Donji Grad, Gardoš, Zemunski Kej	doubled name; see above

== H ==
Street	Original name	Municipality	Neighborhood	Named after
Hablova	Хаблова	Rakovica	Kijevo	U.S. astronomer Edwin Hubble (1889–1953)
Hadži-Đerina	Хаџи-Ђерина	Vračar	Krunski Venac, Vukov Spomenik	Priest Gerasim Georgijević (d. 1804)
Hadži-Milentijeva	Хаџи-Милентијева	Vračar	Karađorđev Park, Neimar	Bishop Melentije Pavlović (1776–1833)
Hadži-Mustafina	Хаџи Мустафина	Zvezdara	Bulbulder, Đeram	Ottoman governor of Serbia Hadji Mustafa Pasha (1733–1801)
Hadži-Nikole Živkovića	Хаџи Николе Живковића	Savski Venac	Savamala	Architect Nikola Živković (1792–1870)
Hadži-Prodanova	Хаџи Проданова	Vračar	Krunski Venac	Rebel Prodan Gligorijević (1760–1825)
Hadži-Ruvimova	Хаџи Рувимова	Vračar	Kalenić	Priest Ruvim Nenadović (1752–1804)
Haima Daviča	Хаима Давича	Palilula	Stara Karaburma	Writer Haim Davičo (1854–1916)
Hajduk Stojka	Хајдук-Стојка	Voćdovac	Jajinci, Kumodraž, Torlak	Local anti-Ottoman rebel Hajduk Stojko
Hajduk-Veljkova	Хајдук-Вељкова	Rakovica	Kneževac, Straževica	Rebel Veljko Petrović (1780–1813)
Hajduk-Veljkov Venac	Хајдук-Вељков венац	Savski Venac	Savamala	same as the above
Hajduk-Veljkovo Sokače	Хајдук-Вељково сокаче	Rakovica	Kneževac	Hajduk-Veljkova Street ("Hajduk-Veljkova alley")
Hajduk-Stankova	Хајдук-Станкова	Zvezdara	Učiteljsko Naselje	Hajduk Stanko Aleksić, literary character
Hanibala Lucića	Ханибала Луцића	Voždovac	Medaković II	Croatian poet Hanibal Lucić (1485–1553)
Harisa Brkića	Хариса Бркића	Rakovica	Košutnjak, Rakovica	Basketball player Haris Brkić (1974–2000)
Hasana Kikića	Хасана Кикића	Voždovac	Selo Rakovica	Poet and combatant Hasan Kikić (1905–1942)
Hasanaginice	Хасанагинице	Rakovica	Kanarevo Brdo	Hasanaginica, folk literature character
Hazarska	Хазарска	Zvezdara	Mali Mokri Lug	Khazar people
Hektorovićeva	Хекторовићева	Zvezdara	Lion	Croatian writer Petar Hektorović (1487–1572)
Hemingvejeva	Хемингвејева	Zemun	Altina	U.S. writer Ernest Hemingway (1899–1961)
Hercega Stjepana	Херцега Стјепана	Stari Grad	Stari Grad	Bosnian magnate Stjepan Vukčić Kosača (1404–1466)
Hercegnovska	Херцегновска	Zemun	Nova Galenika	Town of Herceg Novi, Montenegro
Hercegovačka	Херцеговачка	Savski Venac	Savamala	Region of Herzegovina, Bosnia and Herzegovina
Hercegovačka	Херцеговачка	Zemun	Novi Grad	doubled name; see above
Heroja Gorana Ostojića	Хероја Горана Остојића	Zvezdara	Mirijevo II	Yugoslav wars combatant Goran Ostojić (1962–1998)
Heroja Milana Tepića	Хероја Милана Тепића	Savski Venac	Dedinje, Diplomatska Kolonija	Military officer Milan Tepić (1957–1991)
Heroja Nebojše Živančevića	Хероја Небојше Живанчевића	Zvedara	Mirijevo IV	Yugoslav wars soldier Nebojša Živančević (d. 1991)
Heroja Odbrane Beograda	Хероја одбране Београда	Palilula	Krnjača, Blok Sutjeska	Historical military defenders of Belgrade (in general)
Hilandarska	Хиландарска	Stari Grad	Kopitareva Gradina, Skadarlija	Hilandar Monastery, Mount Athos, Greece
Homoljska	Хомољска	Palilula	Nova Karaburma	Region of Homolje
Hoze Martia	Хозе Мартиа	Palilula	Karaburma Dunav	Cuban author José Martí (1853–1895)
Hrasta Lužnjaka	Храста лужњака	Zemun	Save Kovačevića	Pedunculate oak (tree)
Hristifora Žefarovića	Христифора Жефаровића	New Belgrade	Ledine	Painter Hristofor Žefarović (1690–1753)
Hristine Dobrović	Христине Добровић	Čukarica	Stari Železnik	Philanthropist Hristina Dobrović (1851–1910)
Hrizantema	Хризантема	Voždovac	Kumodraž	Chrysanthemum (flower)
Hrizostoma Vojinovića	Хризостома Војиновића	Zvezdara	Padina	Cleric Hrizostom Vojinović (1911–1989)
Huana Antonia Samarana	Хуана Антониа Самарана	Palilula	Krnjača, Blok Sutjeska	Spanish and Olympic sports administrator Juan Antonio Samaranch (1920–2010)
Humska	Хумска	Voždovac	Autokomanda, Dedinje, Topčidersko Brdo	Medieval Region of Hum, today in Bosnia and Herzegovina
Humski Put	Хумски пут	Rakovica	Kneževac	Humska, old name of the neighborhood ("Humska road")
Husinskih Rudara	Хусинских рудара	Palilula	Ćalije, Karaburma II, Karaburma Dunav	Husino rebellion miners
Husova	Хусова	Voždovac	Dušanovac, Marinkova Bara	Czech church reformer Jan Hus (1369–1415)

== I ==
Street	Original name	Municipality	Neighborhood	Named after
Ibarska	Ибарска	Voždovac	Dušanovac, Pašino Brdo	Ibar river
Ibarski Put	Ибарски пут	Čukarica, Rakovica	Bele Vode, Rupčine, Cerak, Cerak Vinogradi, Vidikovac, Labudovo Brdo, Petlovo Brdo	same as the above; better known as Ibarska magistrala (Ibar Highway)
Ibrahima Babovića	Ибрахима Бабовића	Voždovac	Dušanovac	Communist activist Ibrahim Babović (1907–1934)
Ičkova	Ичкова	Čukarica	Banovo Brdo	Diplomat Petar Ičko (1755–1808)
Ide Branovački	Иде Брановачки	Čukarica	Žarkovo, Repište	Benefactor Ida Branovački (1853–1882)
Idrijska	Идријска	Zvezdara	Zvezdara Forest	Town of Idrija, Slovenia
Iđoška	Иђошка	Palilula	Dunavski Venac, Krnjača	Village of Iđoš
Igmanska	Игманска	Zemun	Novi Grad	Igman mountain, Bosnia and Herzegovina
Ignjata Joba	Игњата Јоба	Voždovac	Braće Jerković III, Medaković, Padina, Siva Stena	Painter Ignjat Job (1895–1936)
Ignjata Stanimirovića	Игњата Станимировића	Zvezdara	Padina	Educator Ignjat Stanimirović (1812–1878)
Igora Vasiljeva	Игора Васиљева	Palilula	Blok Braća Marić, Krnjača	Painter Igor Vasiljev (1928–1954)
Ikarbus Nova (2–4)	Икарбус Нова	Zemun	Grmeč	Ikarbus factory; 3 streets named Ikarbus 2. Nova, 3. Nova and 4. Nova
Iličićeva	Иличићева	Savski Venac	Topčidersko Brdo, Dedinje	?
Ilije Bosilja	Илије Босиља	New Belgrade	Ledine	Painter Ilija Bašičević (1895–1972)
Ilije Čalića	Илије Чалића	Čukarica	Stari Železnik	Combatant Ilija Čalić (1922–1943)
Ilije Đuričića	Илије Ђуричића	Čukarica	Žarkovo	Veterinarian Ilija Đuričić (1898–1965)
Ilije Garašanina	Илије Гарашанина	Palilula	Stara Palilula, Tašmajdan	Politician Ilija Garašanin (1812–1874)
Ilije Gojkovića	Илије Гојковића	Rakovica	Miljakovac III	General Ilija Gojković (1854–1917)
Ilije Guteše	Илије Гутеше	Zvezdara	Mali Mokri Lug	Merchant and benefactor Ilija Guteša (1825–1894)
Ilije Kolarevića	Илије Коларевића	Zvezdara	Mali Mokri Lug	Sculptor Ilija Kolarević (1894–1968)
Ilije Kolovića	Илије Коловића	Čukarica	Stari Železnik	Surgeon Ilija Kolović (1852–1915)
Ilije Pavlovića	Илије Павловића	Zvezdara	Mirijevo IV	Kosovo war soldier Ilija Pavlović (1979–1998)
Ilije Petrovića	Илије Петровића	Voždovac	Jajinci	Translator and lexicographer Ilija M. Petrović (1895–1942)
Ilije Praizovića	Илије Праизовића	Čukarica	Stari Železnik	Soldier Ilija T. Praizović (1877–1949)
Ilije Radojevića	Илије Радојевића	Rakovica	Resnik	World War II combatant Ilija Radojević (1922–1980)
Ilije Rogulića	Илије Рогулића	Zemun	Nova Galenika	Resistance member Ilija Rogulić (1911–1943)
Ilije Stojadinovića	Илије Стојадиновића	Čukarica	Filmski Grad	Bridge engineer Ilija Stojadinović (1926–1982)
Ilije Stojanovića	Илије Стојановића	Čukarica	Stari Železnik	War victim Ilija Stojanović (1925–1944)
Ilindenska	Илинденска	Zvezdara	Zeleno Brdo	Ilinden Uprising (1903)
Ilirska	Илирска	Palilula	Profesorska Kolonija	Illyrian movement (19th century)
Indire Gandi	Индире Ганди	Voždovac	Braće Jerković III	Indian politician Indira Gandhi (1917–1984)
Inđijska	Инђијска	New Belgrade	Ledine	Town of Inđija
Institut za Mehanizaciju	Институт за механизацију	Zemun	Zemun Polje	Institute for Mechanization
Institut za Stočarstvo	Институт за сточарство	Zemun	Zemun Polje	Institute for Husbandry
Internacionalnih Brigada	Интернационалних бригада	Vračar	Čubura, Karađorđev Park, Neimar	International Brigades (Spanish Civil War)
Inženjera Atanackovića	Инжењера Атанацковића	Zemun	Ćukovac, Muhar	Architect Kosta Atanacković-Stanišić (1879-1908)
Inženjera Kapusa	Инжењера Капуса	Zemun	Jelovac, Kalvarija	Architect Dragutin Kapus
Irisa	Ириса	Palilula	Rospi Ćuprija	Iris (plant)
Iriška	Иришка	Zemun	Batajnica	Town of Irig
Irske Desete Divizije	Ирске десете дивизије	Voždovac	Mitrovo Brdo	World War I 10th (Irish) Division
Isaka Njutna	Исака Њутна	Palilula	Višnjica	English scientist Isaac Newton (1642–1727)
Isaka Singera	Исака Сингера	New Belgrade	Ledine	Jewish writer Isaac Bashevis Singer (1902–1991)
Isidora Bajića	Исидора Бајића	Voždovac	Selo Rakovica	Composer Isidor Bajić (1878–1915)
Isidora Dobrovića	Исидора Добровића	Čukarica	Makiš	Merchant and entrepreneur Isidor Dobrović (1841–1914)
Isidora Stojanovića	Исидора Стојановића	Zemun	Plavi Horizonti	Educator Isidor Stojanović (1809–1949)
Isidore Sekulić	Исидоре Секулић	Voždovac	Voždovac	Writer Isidora Sekulić (1877–1958)
Islama Grčkog	Ислама Грчког	Zemun	Batajnica	Village of Islam Grčki, Croatia
Ismeta Mujezinovića	Исмета Мујезиновића	New Belgrade	Bežanijska Kosa	Bosnian painter Ismet Mujezinović (1907–1984)
Istarska	Истарска	Savski Venac	Senjak	Peninsula of Istria, Croatia
Istinićka	Истинићка	Palilula	Dunavski Venac	Village of Istinić
Istočno Selište	Источно селиште	Zvezdara	Mali Mokri Lug	Descriptive (eastern part of the village)
Ištvana Lakija	Иштвана Лакија	Čukarica	Bele Vode	?
Italijanska	Италијанска	New Belgrade	Ledine	Italy (state)
Italijanskih Partizana	Италијанских партизана	Voždovac	Voždovac	World War II Italian partisans
Iva Senkovića	Ива Сенковића	Rakovica	Resnik	Uskok Ivo Senjanin (d. 1612) (cf. Senjanina Ive)
Ivan Begova	Иван бегова	Stari Grad	Kosančićev Venac	Lord of Zeta Ivan Crnojević (1442-1490)
Ivana Aksakova	Ивана Аксакова	Rupčine	Žarkovo, Rupčine	Russian writer and Pan-Slavist Ivan Aksakov (1823–1886)
Ivana Antića	Ивана Антића	Zvezdara	Orlovsko Naselje	Architect Ivan Antić (1923–2005)
Ivana Belića	Ивана Белића	New Belgrade	Ledine	Architect Ivan Belić (1887-1968)
Ivana Božića	Ивана Божића	Zvezdara	Padina	Historian Ivan Božić (1915–1977)
Ivana Delnegra Engleza	Ивана Делнегра Енглеза	Zemun	Batajnica	Combatant Ivan Delnegro (1919–1943)
Ivana Đaje	Ивана Ђаје	Vračar	Čubura, Kalenić	Biologist Ivan Đaja (1884–1957)
Ivana Gorana Kovačića	Ивана Горана Ковачића	Čukarica	Novi Železnik	Croatian poet Ivan Goran Kovačić (1913–1943)
Ivana Gradnika	Ивана Градника	Zvezdara	Zeleno Brdo	Slovene rebel Ivan Miklavčič (1680–1714)
Ivana Gubijana	Ивана Губијана	Palilula	Krnjača, Dunavski Venac	Hammer thrower Ivan Gubijan (1923–2009)
Ivana Kapistrana	Ивана Капистрана	Zvezdara	Cvetko, Zvezdara	Italian priest and military leader John of Capistrano (1386–1456)
Ivana Kneževića	Ивана Кнежевића	Zemun	Novi Grad, Vojni Put II	First Serbian Uprising rebel Ivan Knežević (1760-1840) (cf. Kneza Ive od Semberije)
Ivana Markovića Irca	Ивана Марковића Ирца	New Belgrade	Staro Sajmište	Combatant Ivan Marković Irac (1909–1942)
Ivana Mičurina	Ивана Мичурина	Rakovica	Kanarevo Brdo, Miljakovac, Miljakovac II	Russian biologist Ivan Vladimirovich Michurin (1855–1935)
Ivana Radovića	Ивана Радовића	Zvezdara	Zeleno Brdo	Painter Ivan Radović (1894–1973)
Ivana Sarića	Ивана Сарића	Zvezdara	Mirijevo IV	Aviation pioneer Ivan Sarić (1876–1966)
Ivana Senkovića	Ивана Сенковића	Zemun	Batajnica	Municipal clerk Ivan Senković (d.1914)
Ivana Stojanovića	Ивана Стојановића	Zvezdara	Cvetko	Priest Ivan Stojanović (1829–1900)
Ivana V. Lalića	Ивана В. Лалића	Zvezdara	Zvezdara II	Poet Ivan V. Lalić (1931–1996)
Ivanke Muačević	Иванке Муачевић	Voždovac	Jajinci	Resistance member Ivanka Muačević-Nikoliš (1911–1942)
Ivankovačka	Иванковачка	Palilula	Stara Palilula	Battle of Ivankovac (1805)
Ivanovačke Bitke	Ивановачке битке	Zemun	Novi Grad, Vojni Put II	same as the above
Ive Marinkovića	Иве Маринковића	Zvezdara	Mali Mokri Lug	Combatant Jovan Marinković Ivo (1913–1944)
Ive Vojnovića	Иве Војновића	Savski Venac	Topčider, Dedinje	Writer Ivo Vojnović (1857–1929)
Ivice Devčića	Ивице Девчића	Čukarica	Banovo Brdo	Combatant Ivica Devčić (1920–1943)
Ivićeva	Ивићева	Zemun	Kalvarija, Donji Grad, Ćukovac	Mayor of Zemun Mato Ivić (1830–1886)
Izbička	Избичка	Zvezdara	Zeleno Brdo	Village of Izbica
Izletnička	Излетничка	Voždovac	Kumodraž	Descriptive (excursion place)
Izletnički Put	Излетнички пут	New Belgrade	Franjine Rudine, Tošin Bunar	Same as the above
Izviđačka	Извиђачка	Voždovac	Selo Rakovica	?
Izvorac	Изворац	Čukarica	Stari Železnik	?
Izvorska	Изворска	Čukarica	Banovo Brdo, Golf Naselje	Former local water spring

== L ==
Street	Original name	Municipality	Neighborhood	Named after
Labinska	Лабинска	Rakovica	Resnik	Town of Labin, Croatia
Labska	Лабска	Savski Venac	Maleško Brdo	Lab river
Labuda Šćekovića	Лабуда Шћековића	Rakovica	Resnik	World War II combatant Labud Šćeković
Lackovićeva	Лацковићева	Savski Venac	Dedinje	?
Ladne Vode	Ладне воде	Zvedara	Staro Mirijevo	?
Ladno Brdo	Ладно брдо	Zvezdara	Veliki Mokri Lug	?
Lađarska	Лађарска	New Belgrade	Ledine	Boat making (craft)
Lagumska	Лагумска	Zemun	Donji Grad, Gardoš	Lagums (underground corridors)
Lamartinova	Ламартинова	Vračar	Karađorđev Park, Neimar	French poet Alphonse de Lamartine (1790–1869)
Lapisa	Лаписа	Palilula	Krnjača, Blok Sava Kovačević	Lapis lazuli (gemstone)
Lapovska	Лаповска	Zemun	Vojni put II	Town of Lapovo
Laudonova	Лаудонова	Zemun	Kalvarija, Franjine Rudine	18th century Laudon Trench (after Austrian field marshal Ernst Gideon von Laudon (1717-1790)
Lazara Avramovića	Лазара Аврамовића	Voždovac	Marinkova Bara, Siva Stena	?
Lazara Dimitrijevića	Лазара Димитријевића	Čukarica	Stari Železnik	Physician Lazar Dimitrijević (1858–1899)
Lazara Hilandarca	Лазара Хиландарца	Voždovac	Selo Rakovica	Monk and inventor Lazar the Serb (14th–15th century)
Lazara Komarčića	Лазара Комарчића	Čukarica	Žarkovo, Rupčine	Science fiction pioneer Lazar Komarčić (1839–1909)
Lazara Kujundžića	Лазара Кујунџића	Čukarica	Čukarica	Combatant Lazar Kujundžić (1880–1905)
Lazara Mamuzića	Лазара Мамузића	Zemun	Nova Galenika	Resistance member Lazar Mamuzić (1913–1941)
Lazara Petrovića	Лазара Петровића	Zvezdara	Veliki Mokri Lug	General Lazar Petrović (1855–1903)
Lazara Savatića	Лазара Саватића	Zemun	Jelovac, Kalvarija	Combatant Lazar Savatić (1914–1950)
Lazara Sočice	Лазара Сочице	Savski Venac	Maleško Brdo	Rebel Lazar Sočica (1838–1910)
Lazara Trifunovića	Лазара Трифуновића	Zvezdara	Mirijevo III	Art critic and historian Lazar Trifunović (1929–1983)
Lazara Vozarevića	Лазара Возаревића	Voždovac	Selo Rakovica	Painter Lazar Vozarević (1925–1968)
Lazara Vujaklije	Лазара Вујаклије	Rakovica	Resnik	Painter Lazar Vujaklija (1914–1995)
Lazarevačka	Лазаревачка	Savski Venac	Senjak	Town of Lazarevac
Lazarevački Drum	Лазаревачки друм	Čukarica	Čukarica, Čukarička Padina, Julino Brdo, Sunčana Padina	same as the above ("Lazarevac road")
Lazarevački Drum II Red	Лазаревачки друм II ред	Čukarica	Čukarica, Čukarička Padina, Julino Brdo	Lazarevački Drum Street (2nd row)
Lazarevićeva	Лазаревићева	Vračar	Krunski Venac	Kosta Lazarević, local landowner and taverner
Laze Dokića	Лазе Докића	Zvezdara	Slavujev Venac, Vukov Spomenik	Physician and politician Lazar Dokić (1845–1893)
Laze Jovanovića-Porcija	Лазе Јовановића-Порција	Zemun	Gornji Grad	Opera singer Lazar Jovanović Porcija (1911–1962)
Laze Kostića	Лазе Костића	Zvezdara	Bulbulder, Zvezdara II	Writer and jurist Laza Kostić (1841–1910) (cf. Lazina)
Laze Lazarevića	Лазе Лазаревића	Palilula	Krnjača, Blok Sutjeska	Psychiatrist and writer Laza Lazarević (1851–1891)
Laze Pačua	Лазе Пачуа	Stari Grad	Republic Square	Politician Lazar Paču (1855–1915)
Laze Simića	Лазе Симића	Palilula	Krnjača, Dunavski Venac	?
Laze Stefanovića	Лазе Стефановића	Palilula	Ćalije	Communist activist Laza Stefanović (1885–1950)
Laze Telečkog	Лазе Телечког	Čukarica	Stari Železnik	Actor and director Laza Telečki (1841–1873)
Lazina	Лазина	Voždovac	Selo Rakovica	Writer and jurist Laza Kostić (1841–1910) (cf. Laze Kostića)
Ledi Pedžet	Леди Пеџет	Savski Venac	Dedinje	British humanitarian Louise Paget (1881–1958)
Ledinačka	Лединачка	Zvezdara	Zvezdara II	Village of Ledinci
Leke Kapetana	Леке Капетана	Rakovica	Resnik	Medieval folk hero Leka Kapetan
Lekse Saičića	Лексе Саинчића	Rakovica	Miljakovački Vinogradi	Military officer and swordsman Aleksandar Lekso Saičić (1873–1911)
Lenke Marinković	Ленке Маринковић	Rakovica	Kneževac	Actress, fashion designer and benefactor Jelena Lenka Marinković (1841–1902)
Lenkina	Ленкина	Voždovac	Selo Rakovica	Socialite and muse of Laza Kostić, Jelena Lenka Dunđerski (1870–1895)
Leona Koena	Леона Коена	Voždovac	Jajinci	Painter Leon Koen (1859–1934)
Leonarda da Vinčija	Леонарда да Винчија	Palilula	Višnjica	Italian polymath Leonardo da Vinci (1452–1519)
Lepe Stamenković	Лепе Стаменковић	Palilula	Višnjička Banja	Resistance member Leposava Stamenković (1915–1943)
Lepenička	Лепеничка	Voždovac	Voždovac	Lepenica river
Lepenskog Vira	Лепенског Вира	Zvezdara	Veliki Mokri Lug	Mesolithic locality Lepenski Vir
Leposave Mihailović	Лепосаве Михаиловић	Čukarica	Žarkovo, Bele Vode	Resistance member Leposava Mihailović (1912–1943)
Leposave Miljković	Лепосаве Миљковић	Čukarica	Stari Železnik	Physician Leposava Miljković Vitanović (1882–1960)
Leposave Vujošević	Лепосаве Вујошевић	Čukarica	Žarkovo, Bele Vode	World War II combatant Leposava Vujošević Laloš
Lesnovska	Лесновска	Palilula	Stara Karaburma	Lesnovo monastery, Macedonia
Leskovačka	Лесковачка	Voždovac	Autokomanda	Town of Leskovac
Lеšnikova	Лешникова	Zemun	Kalvarija	Hazelnut (fruit)
Lešačka	Лешачка	Zemun	Zemun Polje	Town of Lešak
Letićeva	Летићева	Rakovica	Kijevo	World War II resistance supporters, spouses Jelena and Vladimir Letić
Letnja	Летња	Voždovac	Kumodraž	Summer (season)
Levskoga	Левскога	Palilula	Stara Karaburma	Bulgarian revolutionary Vasil Levski (1837–1873)
Ličinska	Личинска	Rakovica	Resnik, Avala Grad	Local toponymy Ličina
Lička	Личка	Savski Venac	Savamala	Lika region, Croatia
Lička	Личка	Zemun	Sutjeska	doubled name; see above
Ličkih brigada	Личких бригада	Rakovica	Kijevo, Resnik	World War II Lika Brigades
Lijačka	Лијачка	Voždovac	Dušanovac	?
Liksuri	Ликсури	Voždovac	Jajinci	Town of Lixouri, Greece
Limska	Лимска	Voždovac	Voždovac	Lim river
Lindenmajerova	Линдемајерова	Rakovica	Sunčani Breg	Military medic Emerih Lindenmajer (1806–1884)
Lipa	Липа	Čukarica	Cerak Vinogradi	Linden trees
Lipak	Липак	Voždovac	Selo Rakovica	Locality in the neighborhood
Lipar	Липар	Čukarica	Stari Cerak	?
Lipetska	Липетска	Palilula	Nova Karaburma	City of Lipetsk, Russia
Lipovačka	Липовачка	Zvezdara	Veliki Mokri Lug	?
Lipovačka	Липовачка	Čukarica	Stari Železnik	doubled name; see above (?)
Listopadna	Листопадна	Voždovac	Kumodraž	Deciduous trees
Livačka	Ливачка	New Belgrade	Ledine	Smelting (craft)
Livadska	Ливадска	Zvezdara	Veliki Mokri Lug	?
Livanjska	Ливањска	Zvezdara	Zeleno Brdo	Town of Livno, Bosnia and Herzegovina
Lojze Dolinara	Лојзе Долинара	Voždovac	Selo Rakovica	Slovene sculptor Lojze Dolinar (1893–1970)
Lokrumska	Локрумска	Zvezdara	Zvezdara II	Island of Lokrum, Croatia
Lole Novaković	Лоле Новаковић	New Belgrade	Ledine	Singer Lola Novaković (1935-2016)
Lole Ribara	Лоле Рибара	Čukarica	Železnik	Combatant Ivo Lola Ribar (1916–1943)
Lomina	Ломина	Savski Venac	Savamala, Zeleni Venac	Rebel Arsenije Loma (1778–1815)
Lončarska	Лончарска	New Belgrade	Ledine	Pot making (craft)
Lošinjska Donja	Лошињска доња	Zvezdara	Zeleno Brdo	Lošinjska Street (Lower Lošinjska)
Lošinjska 2. Prilaz	Лошињска 2. прилаз	Zvezdara	Zeleno Brdo	Lošinjska Street (Lošinjska 2. Access)
Lovačka	Ловачка	Čukarica	Žarkovo	?
Lovačka	Ловачка	Palilula	Višnjica	doubled name; see above (?)
Lovranska	Ловранска	Zvezdara	Zvezdara Forest	Town of Lovran, Croatia
Loznička	Лозничка	Vračar	Vračar	Town of Loznica
Lučanska	Лучанска	Palilula	Rospi Ćuprija	Municipality of Lučani
Lugomirska	Лугомирска	Voždovac	Selo Rakovica	Lugomir river
Lugovačka	Луговачка	Rakovica	Resnik	Local toponymy Lugovi
Luja Adamiča	Луја Адамича	New Belgrade	Paviljoni	Slovene author Louis Adamic (1898–1951)
Luja Daviča	Луја Давича	New Belgrade	Ledine	Ballet dancer and choreographer Lujo Davičo (1908-1942)
Luke Spasojevića	Луке Спасојевића	Čukarica	Novi Železnik	Combatant Luka Spasojević (1916–1943)
Luke Vojvodića	Луке Војводића	Rakovica	Skojevsko Naselje	Veteran soldier Luka Vojvodić (1898–2001)
Luke Vukalovića	Луке Вукаловића	Zvezdara	Vukov Spomenik	Rebel Luka Vukalović (1823–1873)
Lukijana Mušickog	Лукијана Мушицког	Zvezdara	Zvezdara Forest	Cleric and author Lukijan Mušicki (1777–1837)
Luneta Milovanovića	Лунета Миловановића	Zvezdara	Rudo, Učiteljsko Naselje	Combatant Miodrag Milovanović (1921–1944)
Luštička	Луштичка	Zvezdara	Padina	Luštica peninsula, Montenegro

== LJ ==
Street	Original name	Municipality	Neighborhood	Named after
Ljermontova	Љермонтова	Voždovac	Dušanovac, Konjarnik I	Russian poet Mikhail Lermontov (1814–1841)
Lješka	Љешка	Čukarica	Banovo Brdo, Čukarica	Town of Lezhë, Albania
Ljevoška	Љевошка	Palilula	Dunavski Venac	Village of Ljevoša
Ljiljane Kontić	Љиљане Контић	Rakovica	Avala Grad, Resnik	Actress Ljiljana Kontić (1931–2005)
Ljiljane Krstić	Љиљане Крстић	Zemun	Altina	Actress Ljiljana Krstić (1919–2001)
Ljiljane Žikić	Љиљане Жикић	Rakovica	Miljakovac III	Kosovo war combatant Ljiljana Žikić Karađorđević (1957–1998)
Ljubana Jednaka	Љубана Једнака	Voždovac	Trošarina	Ljuban Jednak (1916–1997), the sole survivor of the 1941 Glina church massacre
Ljube Čupe	Љубе Чупе	Voždovac	Dušanovac	Soldier Ljubomir S. Jovanović "Ljuba Čupa" (1877–1913)
Ljube Danilovića	Љубе Даниловића	Zvezdara	Staro Mirijevo	Local bonesetter Ljuba Danilović
Ljube Davidovića	Љубе Давидовића	Zvezdara	Cvetko, Denkova Bašta, Učiteljsko Naselje	Politician Ljubomir Davidović (1863–1940)
Ljube Didića	Љубе Дидића	Palilula	Hadžipopovac	Rebel Ljuba Didić (1849–1883)
Ljube Jovanovića	Љубе Јовановића	Savski Venac	Senjak	Politician Ljubomir Jovanović (1865–1928)
Ljube Kovačevića	Љубе Ковачевића	Voždovac	Dušanovac	Historian Ljubomir Kovačević (1848–1918)
Ljube Nedića	Љубе Недића	Voždovac	Dušanovac	Writer and critic Ljubomir Nedić (1858–1902)
Ljube Moljca	Љубе Мољца	Zemun	Batajnica, Šangaj	Actor and comedian Miodrag Andrić, nicknamed Ljuba Moljac (1943-1989)
Ljube Šercera	Љубе Шерцера	Voždovac	Voždovac	Combatant Ljubomir Ljubo Šercer (1915–1941)
Ljube Škiljevića	Љубе Шкиљевића	Zemun	Batajnica, 13. Maj	Actor Ljubo Škiljević (1941-1999)
Ljube Tadića	Љубе Тадића	Zvezdara	Staro Mirijevo	Actor Ljuba Tadić (1929–2005)
Ljube Vučkovića	Љубе Вучковића	Voždovac	Voždovac	Army officer Ljubo Vučković (1915–1976)
Ljubice Čakarević	Љубице Чакаревић	Zvezdara	Mali Mokri Lug	Teacher and World War I combatant Ljubica Čakarević (1894–1980)
Ljubice Di Sorno	Љубице Ди Сорно	Voždovac	Banjica	same as the above (née Čakarević)
Ljubice Đođrević	Љубице Ђорђевић	Palilula	Krnjača, Dunavski Venac	Librarian Ljubica Đorđević (1922–1999)
Ljubice Ivošević-Dimitrov	Љубице Ивошевић-Димитров	Čukarica	Stari Cerak, Cerak Vinogradi	Socialist activist Ljubica Ivošević Dimitrov (1884–1933)
Ljubice Janković	Љубице Јанковић	Voždovac	Jajinci	Ethnomusicologist Ljubica Janković (1894–1974) (cf. Sestara Janković)
Ljubice Ković	Љубице Ковић	Zemun	Donji Grad	Actress Ljubica Ković (1923-2014)
Ljubice Luković	Љубице Луковић	Zvezdara	Zvezdara II	Nurse and activist Ljubica Luković (1858–1915)
Ljubice Ravasi	Љубице Раваси	Čukarica	Makiš	Actress Ljubica Ravasi (1916–1995)
Ljubičicа	Љубичица	Voždovac	Kumodraž	Violet (flower)
Ljubinke Bobić	Љубинке Бобић	New Belgrade	Bežanija, Bežanijska Kosa	Actress Ljubinka Bobić (1897–1978)
Ljubiše Baje Bačića	Љубише Баје Бачића	Rakovica	Resnik	Actor Ljubiša Bačić (1922–1999)
Ljubiše Glišića	Љубише Глишића	Čukarica	Žarkovo, Rupčine	Biologist Ljubiša Glišić (1888–1987)
Ljubiše Jelenkovića	Љубише Јеленковића	Rakovica	Resnik	?
Ljubiše Jovanovića	Љубише Јовановића	Čukarica	Čukarica	Actor Ljubiša Jovanović (1908–1971)
Ljubomira Didića	Љубомира Дидића	Zemun	Batajnica	Actor Ljubomir Didić (1921-1987)
Ljubomira Đokovića	Љубoмира Ђоковића	Čukarica	Stari Železnik	Dentist Ljubomir Đoković (1897–1985)
Ljubomira Ivanovića	Љубoмира Ивановића	Palilula	Kotež	Painter Ljubomir Ivanović (1882–1945)
Ljubomira Ivkovića-Šuce	Љубoмира Ивковића-Шуце	Rakovica	Kneževac	Combatant and politician Ljubomir Ivković Šuca (1910–1983)
Ljubomira Jovanovića	Љубoмира Јовановића	Palilula	Višnjička Banja	Historian and politician Ljubomir Jovanović (1865–1928)
Ljubomira Stojanovića	Љубoмира Стојановића	Palilula	Profesorska Kolonija	Politician and philologist Ljubomir Stojanović (1860–1930)
Ljubomira Vukadinovića	Љубoмира Вукадиновића	Zvezdara	Mali Mokri Lug	Sports reporter Ljubomir Vukadinović (1912–1973)
Ljubomira Živkovića-Španca	Љубoмира Живковића-Шпанца	Zemun	Zemun Polje	Combatant Ljubomir Živković Španac (1918–1942)
Ljubostinjska	Љубoстињска	Vračar	Vračar	Ljubostinja Monastery
Ljubotenska	Љубoтенска	Zemun	Zemun Polje	Ljuboten Peak, Šar Mountains
Ljubovijska	Љубoвијска	Zvezdara	Zeleno Brdo	Town of Ljubovija
Ljudevita Štura	Људевита Штура	Palilula	Krnjača, Ovčanski Sebeš	Slovak cultural leader Ľudovít Štúr (1815–1856)
Ljutice Bogdana	Љутице Богдана	Savski Venac	Autokomanda, Dedinje, Stadion	Medieval folk hero Ljutica Bogdan

== N ==
Street	Original name	Municipality	Neighborhood	Named after
Nabokovljeva	Набоковљева	Zvezdara	Mali Mokri Lug	Russian novelist Vladimir Nabokov (1899–1977)
Nade Dimić	Наде Димић	Zemun	Gornji Grad, Gardoš	Resistance member Nada Dimić (1923–1942)
Nade Naumović	Наде Наумовић	Voždovac	Siva Stena, Braće Jerković	Resistance member Nada Naumović (1922–1941)
Nade Purić	Наде Пурић	Zvezdara	Staro Mirijevo	Resistance member Nada Purić (1903–1941)
Nade Purić 1. prilaz	Наде Пурић 1. прилаз	Zvezdara	Staro Mirijevo	Nade Purić Street (Nade Purić 1. Access)
Nadežde Petrović	Надежде Петровић	Čukarica	Banovo Brdo	Painter Nadežda Petrović (1873–1915)
Nake Spasić	Наке Петровић	Savski Venac	Dedinje	Benefactor Anastasija Naka Spasić (1864–1953)
Namesnika Protića	Намесника Протића	Savski Venac	Dedinje	Army general and politician Kosta Protić (1831–1892)
Nandora Glida	Нандора Глида	Zvezdara	Mali Mokri Lug	Sculptor Nandor Glid (1924–1997)
Narcisa	Нарциса	Palilula	Krnjača, Dunavski Venac	Narcissus (flower)
Narednička	Наредничка	Zemun	Vojni put II	Sergeant (military rank; narednik)
Narednika Dragutina Radakovića	Наредника Драгутина Радаковића	Voždovac	Kumodraž	Military sergeant Dragutin Radaković
Narodnih Heroja	Народних хероја	New Belgrade	Studentski Grad, Fontana	World War II People's heroes
Narodnog Fronta	Народног фронта	Zvezdara	Mali Mokri Lug	Communist organization of People's Front of Yugoslavia (1947–1953)
Naselje Zemun Polje – Mala Pruga	Насеље Земун поље – Мала пруга	Zemun	Mala Pruga, Altina	?
Naselje Zemun Polje – Mala Pruga (1–2)	Насеље Земун поље – Мала пруга (1–2)	Zemun	Mala Pruga, Altina	Zemun Polje – Mala Pruga Street; two streets numbered 1 and 2
Nasipska Čuvarnica Br. 9	Насипска чуварница бр. 9	Palilula	Krnjača, Blok Zaga Malivuk	Embankment guardhouse No. 9
Nasipska Čuvarnica Br. 10	Насипска чуварница бр. 10	Palilula	Krnjača, Sibnica	Embankment guardhouse No. 10
Nastićeva	Настићева	Čukarica	Žarkovo, Repište	?
Natalije Bjelajac	Наталије Бјелајац	Voždovac	Banjica	Nurse and combatant Antonija Javornik (1893-1974) (cf. Antonije Javornik)
Natalije Munk	Наталије Мунк	Rakovica	Avala Grad, Resnik	Nurse, humanitarian and volunteer Natalija Neti Munk (1864–1924)
Natalije Dubajić	Наталије Дубајић	Zemun	Batajnica	Combatant Natalija Dubajić (1925–1943)
Natalijine Ramonde	Наталијине рамонде	Rakovica	Sunčani Breg	Natalie's ramonda flower
Nataše Bošković	Наташе Бошковић	Zemun	Batajnica	Ballerina Nataša Bošković (1901-1973)
Natoševićeva	Натошевићева	Rakovica	Kanarevo Brdo, Stari Košutnjak	Pedagogue Djordje Natošević (1821–1887)
Nebojše Dukića	Небојше Дукића	Zemun	Batajnica	Croatian war soldier Nebojša Dukić (1974-1993)
Nebojše Đukelića	Небојше Ђукелића	Čukarica	Košutnjak, Filmski Grad	Film critic and journalist Nebojša Đukelić (1947–1996)
Nebojše Markovića	Небојше Марковића	Čukarica	Stari Železnik	?
Nebojšina	Небојшина	Vračar	Neimar, Karađorđev Park, Savinac	?
Nede Spasojević	Неде Спасојевић	New Belgrade	Bežanija	Actress Neda Spasojević (1941–1981)
Nedeljka Čabrinovića	Недељка Чабриновића	Čukarica	Banovo Brdo, Golf Naselje	Revolutionist Nedeljko Čabrinović (1895–1916)
Nedeljka Gvozdenovića	Недељка Гвозденовића	New Belgrade	Bežanija, Bežanijska Kosa	Painter Nedeljko Gvozdenović (1902–1988)
Nedeljka Košanina	Недељка Кошанина	Palilula	Višnjička Banja	Biologist and botanist Nedeljko Košanin (1874–1934)
Negotinska	Неготинска	Rakovica	Resnik	Тоwn of Negotin
Negovana Ljubinkovića	Негована Љубинковића	Zemun	Zemun Polje	Combatant Negovan Ljubinković (1915–1943)
Nehruova	Нехруова	New Belgrade	Bežanija, Stara Bežanija, Bežanijski Blokovi, Savski Blokovi, Savski Nasip	Indian politician Jawaharlal Nehru (1889–1964)
Nemanjina	Немањина	Savski Venac	Slavija, West Vračar, Savamala	Grand župan Stefan Nemanja (1133–1199)
Nemanjina	Немањина	Zemun	Donji Grad	doubled name; see above
Nemirović Dančenka	Немировић Данченка	Čukarica	Banovo Brdo	Russian theatre director Vladimir Nemirovich-Danchenko (1858–1943)
Nenada Golubovića	Ненада Голубовића	Zemun	Batajnica, Šangaj	Kosovo War combatant Nenad Golubović (1976-1999)
Nenada Manojlovića	Ненада Манојловића	Rakovica	Kijevo	Water polo player and manager Nenad Manojlović (1954–2014)
Nenadovićeva	Ненадовићева	Zemun	Vojni put II	Lithographer Milivoj Nenadović (1824-????)
Neretvanska	Неретванска	Zvezdara	Zvezdara Forest, Zvezdara II	Neretva river, Bosnia and Herzegovina and Croatia
Nerodimska	Неродимска	Zvezdara	Zvezdara II	Nerodimka river
Nestora Žučnoga	Нестора Жучнога	Voždovac	Voždovac	Poet and journalist Proka Jovkić (1886–1915)
Nestorovićeva	Несторовићева	New Belgrade	Ledine	Architect Bogdan Nestorović (1901-1975)
Nevena	Невена	Palilula	Rospi Ćuprija	Marigold (flower)
Nevenke Urbanove	Невенке Урбанове	Zvezdara	Mirijevo	Actress Nevenka Urbanova (1909–2007)
Nevesinjska	Невесињска	Vračar	Vračar, Kalenić	Town of Nevesinje, Bosnia and Herzegovina
Neznanog junaka	Незнаног јунака	Savski Venac	Dedinje	Unknown Hero
Nićifora Dučića	Нићифора Дучића	Savski Venac	Topčidersko Brdo, Autokomanda	Cleric and academic Nićifor Dučić (1832–1900)
Nićifora Ninkovića	Нићифора Нинковића	Rakovica	Petlovo Brdo	Author Nićifor Ninković (1788–1850)
Nike Maksimovića	Нике Максимовића	Rakovica	Resnik	Lawyer and politician Nikola Maksimović (politician) (1840–1907)
Nikice Popovića	Никице Поповића	Zemun	Batajnica	Combatant Nikica Popović (d. 1942)
Nikolaja Berđajeva	Николаја Берђајева	New Belgrade	Ledine	Russian philosopher Nikolai Berdyaev (1874–1948)
Nikolaja Gogolja	Николаја Гогоља	Čukarica	Čukarica, Banovo Brdo	Russian writer Nikolai Gogol (1809–1852)
Nikolaja Hartviga	Николаја Хартвига	Vračar	Neimar, Čubura	Russian diplomat Nicholas Hartwig (1857–1914)
Nikolaja R. Korsakova	Николаја Р. Корсакова	New Belgrade	Bežanija	Russian composer Nikolai Rimsky-Korsakov (1844-1908)
Nikolaja Krasnova	Николаја Краснова	Vračar	Vračar, Englezovac	Russian émigré architect Nikolay Krasnov (1864–1939)
Nikolaja Kravcova	Николаја Кравцова	Savski Venac	Savamala	Red Army soldier Nikolaj Kravcov (1921–1944)
Nikolaja Ostrovskog	Николаја Островског	Zemun	Donji Grad	Russian writer Nikolai Ostrovsky (1904–1936)
Nikolaja Saltikova	Николаја Салтикова	Zemun	Plavi Horizonti	Russian émigré mathematician Nikolai Saltykov (1872–1961)
Nikolajevićeva	Николајевићева	Rakovica	Miljakovac III	Author and politician Svetomir Nikolajević (1844–1922) (cf. Svetomira Nikolajevića)
Nikole Altomanovića	Николе Алтомановића	Zvezdara	Padina	Nobleman Nikola Altomanović (1348–1396)
Nikole Baloga	Николе Балога	New Belgrade	Ledine	Jurist and professor Nikola Balog (1913-1986)
Nikole Beševića	Николе Бешевића	Voždovac	Mitrovo Brdo	Painter Nikola Bešević (1892–1970)
Nikole Bižumića	Николе Бижумића	Rakovica	Miljakovac III	Manual hair clipper inventor Nikola Bizumić (1823–1906)
Nikole Čupića	Николе Чупића	Zvezdara	Cvetko	Military officer and benefactor Nikola Čupić (1834–1870)
Nikole Ćuka	Николе Ћука	Čukarica	Stari Železnik	Merchant and philanthropist Nikola Ćuk (1860–1937)
Nikole Demonje	Николе Демоње	Zemun	Batajnica, Šangaj	Combatant Nikola Demonja (1919–1944)
Nikole Dobrovića	Николе Добровића	New Belgrade	Bežanijska Kosa	Architect Nikola Dobrović (1897–1967)
Nikole Doksata	Николе Доксата	Zvezdara	Zvezdara II, Zvezdara Forest, Staro Mirijevo	Swiss engineer and architect Nicolas Doxat (1682–1738)
Nikole Đurkovića	Николе Ђурковића	Voždovac	Voždovac	Combatant and Communist activist Nikola Đurković (1908–1943)
Nikole Grulovića	Николе Груловића	Zvezdara	Veliki Mokri Lug	Revolutionary and politician Nikola Grulović (1888–1959)
Nikole Karaklajića	Николе Караклајића	Zemun	Kolonija Zmaj	Chess master Nikola Karaklajić (1926-2008)
Nikole Kareva	Николе Карева	New Belgrade	Bežanija	Bulgarian-Macedonian revolutionary Nikola Karev (1877–1905)
Nikole Kurelića	Николе Курелића	Zvezdara	Veliki Mokri Lug	Physical educator Nikola Kurelić (1917–1982)
Nikole Milića	Николе Милића	Zemun	Batajnica, Šangajska	Actor Nikola Milić (1924-2000)
Nikole L. Stojanovića	Николе Л. Стојановића	Zvezdara	Mali Mokri Lug	Historian and librarian Nikola L. Stojanović (1926–2015)
Nikole Marakovića	Николе Мараковића	Rakovica	Miljakovac II	Combatant Nikola Maraković (1912–1943)
Nikole Miljanovića	Николе Миљановића	Voždovac	Voždovac	Combatant Nikola MIljanović (1914–1944)
Nikole Nestorovića	Николе Несторовића	Zvezdara	Mali Mokri Lug	Architect Nikola Nestorović (1868–1957)
Nikole Rašića	Николе Рашића	Čukarica	Žarkovo, Rupčine	Revolutionary and guerilla fighter Kole Rašić (1839–1898)
Nikole Ribarića	Николе Рибарића	Zemun	Nova Galenika	Resistance member Nikola Ribarić (1925–1945)
Nikole Sovilja	Николе Совиља	Voždovac	Pašino Brdo	Combatant Nikola Sovilj (1919–1944)
Nikole Spasića	Николе Спасића	Stari Grad	Kosančićev Venac	Manufacturer and benefactor Nikola Spasić (1838–1916)
Nikole Stefanovića	Николе Стефановића	Vračar	Crveni Krst	?
Nikole Strineke	Николе Стринеке	Voždovac	Trošarina, Voždovac	Resistance member Nikola Strineka (d. 1942)
Nikole Suknjarevića-Prike	Николе Сукњаревића-Прике	Zemun	Batajnica	Resistance member Nikola Suknjarević (1919–1943)
Nikole Tanurdžića	Николе Танурџића	Čukarica	Stari Železnik	Merchant and benefactor Nikola Tanurdžić (1887–1969)
Nikole Tesle	Николе Тесле	Zemun	Retenzija	Inventor Nikola Tesla (1856–1943) (cf. Bulevar Nikole Tesle)
Nikole Vučete	Николе Вучете	Čukarica	Čukarička Padina	Combatant Nikola Vučeta (1913–1966)
Nikole Vulića	Николе Вулића	Zvezdara	Zeleno Brdo	Archaeologist and historian Nikola Vulić (1872–1945)
Nikše Gradija	Никше Градија	Zvezdara	Učiteljsko Naselje	Author Nikša Gradi (1825–1994)
Nikše Stipčevića	Никше Стипчевића	Rakovica	Resnik	Literary historian Nikša Stipčević (1929–2011)
Nikšićka	Никшићка	Voždovac	Voždovac	Town of Nikšić, Montenegro
Nilsa Bora	Нилса Бора	Zvezdara	Zeleno Brdo	Danish physicist Niels Bohr (1885–1962)
Nine Kirsanove	Нине Кирсанове	Zvezdara	Zeleno Brdo	Russian émigré ballerina and choreographer Nina Kirsanova (1898–1989)
Ninka Petrovića	Нинка Петровића	Čukarica	Stari Železnik	Lawyer and mayor Ninko Petrović (1896–1981)
Nišavska	Нишавска	Zvezdara	Zvezdara II, Zvezdara Forest	Nišava river
Niška	Нишка	Vračar	Vukov Spomenik	Town of Niš
Niška	Нишка	Zemun	Gornji Grad	doubled name; see above
Niška	Нишка	Čukarica	Stari Železnik	tripled name; see above
Nodilova	Нодилова	Čukarica	Čukarica, Careva Ćuprija	Academic Natko Nodilo (1834–1912)
Norveška	Норвешка	New Belgrade	Bežanija, Bežanijska Kosa	Norway (state)
Nova 9.	Нова 9.	Voždovac	Voždovac, Trošarina	numbered name (New 9th Street)
Nova 42.	Нова 42.	Zvzedara	Mirijevo II	numbered name (New 42nd Street)
Nova 109.	Нова 109.	Palilula	Višnjica	numbered name (New 109th Street)
Nova 110.	Нова 110.	Palilula	Višnjica	numbered name (New 110th Street)
Nova 114.	Нова 114.	Palilula	Višnjica	numbered name (New 114th Street)
Nova 501.	Нова 501.	Vračar	Crveni Krst	numbered name (New 501st Street)
Novaka Atanackovića	Новака Атанацковића	Zemun	Batajnica	Combatant Novak Atanacković (d.1943)
Novaka Novaka	Новака Новака	Čukarica	Žarkovo, Rupčine	Humorist and screenwriter Novak Novak (1928–1995)
Novakova	Новакова	Voždovac	Voždovac	?
Novice Cerovića	Новице Церовића	Zvezdara	Zvezdara II, Zvezdara Forest	Military leader Novica Cerović (1805–1895)
Novice Mitića	Новице Митића	Rakovica	Resnik	Veterinarian geneticist Novica Mitić (1921–1988)
Novice Tadića	Новице Тадића	Palilula	Krnjača, Blok Sutjeska	Poet Novica Tadić (1949–2011)
Novobeogradskih Graditelja	Новобеоградских градитеља	New Belgrade	Ledine	Members of the Youth work actions who built New Belgrade
Novobrdska	Новобрдска	Zvezdara	Zeleno Brdo	Town of Novo Brdo
Novogradska	Новоградска	Zemun	Gornji Grad, Ćukovac, Sava Kovačević, Kalvarija	Neighborhood of Novi Grad
Novopazarska	Новопазарска	Vračar	Čubura, Kalenić	Town of Novi Pazar
Novosadska	Новосадска	Zemun	Batajnica	Town of Novi Sad (cf. Autoput Za Novi Sad)
Novovaroška	Нововарошка	Palilula	Rospi Ćuprija	Town of Nova Varoš
Nušićeva	Нушићева	Stari Grad	Terazije	Playwright Branislav Nušić (1864–1938)
Nušićeva	Нушићева	Zemun	Ćukovac	doubled name; see above

== NJ ==
Street	Original name	Municipality	Neighborhood	Named after
Njegoševa	Његошева	Vračar	Cvetni Trg, Grantovac, Vračar, Kalenić	Prince-bishop and poet Petar II Petrović-Njegoš (1813–1851)
Njegoševa	Његошева	Zemun	Zemunski Kej, Gardoš, Muhar	doubled name; see above

== Š ==
Street	Original name	Municipality	Neighborhood	Named after
Šabačka	Шабачка	Zvezdara	Đeram, Lion	Town of Šabac
Šabana Bajramovića	Шабана Бајрамовића	Zemun	Sutjeska, Bački Ilovik	Folk singer Šaban Bajramović (1936-2008)
Šafarikova	Шафарикова	Stari Grad	Kopitareva Gradina, Skadarlija	Slovak Slavist and philologist Pavel Jozef Šafárik (1795–1861)
Šafranova	Шафранова	Palilula	Rospi Ćuprija	Saffron (flower)
Šainovac	Шаиновац	Palilula	Višnjica	?
Šajkaška	Шајкашка	Palilula	Jevremovac, Stari Grad	Region of Šajkaška
Šajkaška	Шајкашка	Zemun	Bački Ilovik, Novi Grad	doubled name; see above
Šamačka	Шамачка	Zvezdara	Konjarnik II	Town of Šamac, Bosnia and Herzegovina
Šandora Majora	Шандора Мајора	Zemun	Zemun Polje	Combatant Šandor Major (d. 1942)
Šangajska	Шангајска	Zemun	Batajnica, Šangaj	Neighborhood of Šangaj
Šangajska (1–12)	Шангајска (1–12)	Zemun	Batajnica, Šangaj	Šangajska Street; 12 streets named Šangajska 1, Šangajska 2, etc.
Šantičeva	Шантићева	Stari Grad	Stari Grad	Poet Aleksa Šantić (1868–1924)
Šarplaninska	Шарпланинска	Palilula	Krnjača, Dunavski Venac	Šar Mountains
Šavnička	Шавничка	Čukarica	Stari Cerak	Town of Šavnik, Montenegro
Ščerbinova	Шчербинова	Čukarica	Banovo Brdo, Čukarica	Russian diplomat Grigoriy Schterbina (1868–1903)
Šejkina	Шејкина	Zvezdara	Staro Mirijevo	Painter Leonid Šejka (1932–1970)
Šekspirova	Шекспирова	Savski Venac	Dedinje	English playwright William Shakespeare (1564–1616)
Šekularska	Шекуларска	Rakovica	Sunčani Breg	Šekular region, Montenegro
Šemsa Midovića	Шемса Мидовића	Zvezdara	Veliki Mokri Lug	Combatant Šemso Midović (d. 1915)
Šempeter Vrtobja	Шемпетер Вртојба	Voždovac	Mitrovo Brdo	Municipality of Šempeter-Vrtojba, Slovenia
Šeširdžijska	Шеширџијска	New Belgrade	Ledine	Hatmaking (craft)
Šetalište Lazaro Kardenasa	Шеталиште Лазаро Карденаса	New Belgrade	Savski Blokovi	Mexican president Lázaro Cárdenas (1895–1970)
Ševarice	Шеварице	Zvezdara	Staro Mirijevo	?
Ševina	Шевина	Zemun	Novi Grad, Železnička Kolonija	?
Šidska	Шидска	New Belgrade	Ledine	Town of Šid
Šilerova	Шилерова	Zemun	Meandri, Sava Kovačević, Sutjeska	German poet Friedrich Schiller (1759–1805)
Šimanovačka	Шимановачка	Zemun	Batajnica	Village of Šimanovci
Široki Put	Широки пут	Zemun	Batajnica	Descriptive ("Wide Road")
Široki Put (1–5)	Широки пут (1–5)	Zemun	Batajnica	Široki Put Street; 5 streets named Široki Put 1, Široki Put 2, etc.
Školska	Школска	Zemun	Batajnica	?
Školsko Dobro	Школско добро	Zemun	Školsko Dobro, Zemun Polje	?
Šlep Stenka	Шлеп Стенка	Savski Venac	Bara Venecija, Ada Ciganlija, Šest Topola	Stenka barge-restaurant
Šljivarska	Шљиварска	Voždovac	Kumodraž, Torlak	Plum growing
Šolina	Шолина	Savski Venac	Dedinje	Politician Atanasije Šola (1878–1955)
Španska	Шпанска	New Belgrade	Blokovi	Spain (state)
Španskih Boraca	Шпанских бораца	New Belgrade	Blocks 24–26 and 28–30	Yugoslav volunteers in the Spanish Civil War 1936–1939
Štipska	Штипска	Savski Venac	Senjak	Town of Štip, Macedonia
Šturmova	Штурмова	Zemun	Novi Grad, Vojni Put I	General Pavle Jurišić Šturm (1848-1922) (cf. Pavla Jurišića Šturma; Generala Pavla Jurišića Šturma)
Šumadijska	Шумадијска	Zvezdara	Mali Mokri Lug	Region of Šumadija; (cf. Šumadijski Trg)
Šumadijska	Шумадијска	Zemun	Gornji Grad	doubled name; see above
Šumadijske Divizije	Шумадијске дивизије	Voždovac	Stepa Stepanović	Šumadija Division (World War I)
Šumarice	Шумарице	Rakovica	Petlovo Brdo	Location of the 1941 Kragujevac massacre
Šumatovačka	Шуматовачка	Vračar	Čubura, Neimar	Battle of Šumatovac (1876)
Šumska	Шумска	Zemun	Kolonija Zmaj	Nearby forested area between Kolonija Zmaj and Bežanijska Kosa
Šupljikčeva	Шупљикчева	Voždovac	Marinkova Bara	Military commander Stevan Šupljikac (1786–1848) (cf. Vojvode Šupljikca)
Švejkova	Швејкова	New Belgrade	Ledine	Good soldier Švejk, literary character
Švrakina	Швракина	Zemun	Vojni Put II	Athletics coach Mihajlo Švraka (1955-2012)

== Z ==
Street	Original name	Municipality	Neighborhood	Named after
Zabran – Nova (1–11)	Забран – Нова (1–11)	Zemun	Batajnica	?; 11 streets named Zabran – Nova 1, Zabran – Nova 2, etc.
Zabranska	Забранска	Zvezdara	Veliki Mokri Lug	?
Zabrda	Забрда	Rakovica	Avala Grad, Resnik	?
Zabrđanska	Забрђанска	Zvezdara	Mali Mokri Lug	?
Zadrugarska	Задругарска	Zemun	Sutjeska	Rural cooperatives
Zadužbinska	Задужбинска	Zemun	Gornji Grad	Acts of benefaction, in general
Zagorke Berović	Загорке Беровић	Palilula	Krnjača, Partizanski Blok	Rheumatologist Zagorka Berović (1900–1988)
Zagrađe	Заграђе	Zvezdara	Staro Mirijevo	?
Zahumska	Захумска	Zvezdara	Vukov Spomenik	Medieval principality of Zachlumia, today in Bosnia and Herzegovina
Zajcova	Зајцова	Voždovac	Medaković	Croatian composer Ivan Zajc (1832–1914)
Zaječarska	Зајечарска	Savski Venac	Dedinje, Topčidersko Brdo	Town of Zaječar
Zapadno Selište	Западно селиште	Zvezdara	Mali Mokri Lug	Descriptive (western part of the village)
Zapadnomoravska	Западноморавска	Palilula	Krnjača, Blok Braća Marić	West Morava river
Zapis	Запис	Voždovac	Jajinci, Miljakovac III	Zapis, sacred trees
Zaplanjska	Заплањска	Voždovac	Braće Jerković, Braće Jerković II, Marinkova Bara, Medaković, Siva Stena	Region of Zaplanje
Zarija Vujoševića	Зарија Вујошевића	New Belgrade	Staro Sajmište	Combatant Zarija Vujošević (1903–1943)
Zastavnička	Заставничка	Zemun	Novi Grad, Vojni Put I	Warrant officer (military rank; zastavnik)
Zaviše Crnog	Завише Црног	Savski Venac	Senjak	Polish knight Zawisza Czarny (1379–1428)
Zavodska	Заводска	Voždovac	Kumodraž, Torlak	Institute for immunobiology and virusology (institute = zavod)
Zdravka Čelara	Здравка Челара	Palilula	Bogoslovija, Hadžipopovac, Profesorska Kolonija	Combatant Zdravko Čelar (1917–1942)
Zdravka Jovanovića	Здравка Јовановића	Čukarica	Bele Vode, Žarkovo	Combatant Zdravko Jovanović (1909–1943)
Zdravka Velimirovića	Здравка Велимировића	Rakovica	Resnik	Film director Zdravko Velimirović (1930–2005)
Zdravka Zupana	Здравка Зупана	New Belgrade	Dr Ivan Ribar	Commic book author Zdravko Zupan (1950-2015)
Zeke Buljubaše	Зеке Буљубаше	Zvezdara	Bulbulder	Rebel Zeka Buljubaša (1785–1813)
Zelengorska	Зеленгорска	Zvezdara	Zeleno Brdo	Zelengora mountain, Bosnia and Herzegovina
Zelengorska	Зеленгорска	New Belgrade, Zemun	Bežanijska Kosa, Franjine Rudine	doubled name; see above
Zeleni Venac	Зелени венац	Savski Venac, Stari Grad	Varoš Kapija, Zeleni Venac	Kafana "Zeleni Venac"
Zeleno Brdo	Зелено брдо	Zvezdara	Zeleno Brdo	Zeleno Brdo, local hill
Zelenjak	Зелењак	Rakovica	Resnik	Local hilly slope Zelenjak
Zemljoradnička	Земљорадничка	Voždovac	Kumodraž	Agriculture, in general
Zemunska	Земунска	New Belgrade	Bežanijska Kosa, Blokovi	Town of Zemun
Zemunski Put	Земунски пут	New Belgrade	Staro Sajmište, Ušće	same as the above (Zemun Road)
Zenička	Зеничка	Palilula	Rospi Ćuprija, Višnjička Banja	Town of Zenica, Bosnia and Herzegovina
Zetska	Зетска	Stari Grad	Skadarlija	Medieval Principality of Zeta, today in Montenegro
Zidarska	Зидарска	Zvezdara	Konjarnik III	?
Zimonjićeva	Зимоњићева	Čukarica	Golf Naselje, Košutnjak	Priest and rebel Bogdan Zimonjić (1813–1909)
Zire Adamovića	Зире Адамовића	Zemun	Altina	Journalist Dragoslav Adamović (1922–1978)
Zlatana Vaude	Златана Вауде	Rakovica	Sunčani Breg	Composer and conductor Zlatan Vauda (1923–2010)
Zlatanovićev Sokak	Златановићев сокак	Čukarica	Stari Železnik	Čede Zlatanovića Street ("Zlatanović Alley")
Zlatarićeva	Златарићева	Savski Venac	Dedinje	Ragusan poet and translator Dinko Zlatarić (1558–1613)
Zlatarska	Златарска	Zvezdara	Mali Mokri Lug, Zvezdara III	Zlatar mountain
Zlate Petković	Злате Петковић	Čukarica	Makiš	Actress Zlata Petković (1954–2012)
Zlatiborska	Златиборска	Zvezdara	Mali Mokri Lug	Zlatibor mountain
Zlatiborska	Златиборска	Zemun	Jelovac, Kalvarija, Sava Kovačević	doubled name; see above
Zlatka Šnajdera	Златка Шнајдера	Zemun	Banjica II	Communist youth leader Zlatko Šnajder (1903–1931)
Zlotska	Злотска	New Belgrade	Ledine	Zlot Cave
Zmaj-Ognjena Vuka	Змај-Огњена Вука	Savski Venac	Gospodarska Mehana, Senjak	Despot Vuk Grgurević Branković (1438–1485) (cf. Zmaja Ognjenog Vuka)
Zmaj Jovina	Змај Јовина	Stari Grad	Obilićev Venac	Poet Jovan Jovanović Zmaj (1833–1904)
Zmaj Jovina	Змај Јовина	Zemun	Donji Grad, Zemunski Kej	doubled name; see above
Zmaja od Avale	Змаја од Авале	Voždovac	Selo Rakovica	Rebel Vasa Čarapić (1768–1806) (cf. Vase Čarapića)
Zmaja od Noćaja	Змаја од Ноћаја	Stari Grad	Dorćol, Kalemegdan	Rebel Stojan Čupić (1765–1815)
Zmaja Ognjenog Vuka	Змаја Огњеног Вука	Voždovac	Jajinci	Despot Vuk Grgurević Branković (1438–85) (cf. Zmaj-Ognjena Vuka)
Zmajevac	Змајевац	Čukarica	Zmajevac, Žarkovo	Zmajevac, former local stream
Zmajevačka	Змајевачка	Čukarica	Zmajevac, Žarkovo	Zmajevac Street
Zmajevačka 2. Red	Змајевачка 2. ред	Čukarica	Zmajevac, Žarkovo	Zmajevačka Street
Zografska	Зографска	New Belgrade	Ledine	Icons painting, as a craft
Zorana Gluščevića	Зорана Глушчевића	Zvezdara	Padina	Author and literary critic Zoran Gluščević (1926–2006)
Zorana Bogavca	Зорана Богавца	Palilula	Krnjača, Partizanski Blok	Journalist Zoran Bogavac (1947–2006)
Zorana Gostovića	Зорана Гостовића	Zemun	Batajnica, Ekonomija	Croatian war soldier Zoran Gostović (1971-1992)
Zorana Mišića	Зорана Мишића	Palilula	Krnjača, Dunavski Venac	Literary critic Zoran Mišić (1921–1976)
Zorana Radmilovića	Зорана Радмиловића	Zvezdara	Mirijevo III	Actor Zoran Radmilović (1933–1984)
Zore Drempetić	Зоре Дремпетић	Palilula	Lešće	Folk singer and actress Zora Drempetić (1927–2013)
Zore Petrović	Зоре Петровић	Palilula	Krnjača, Reva	Painter Zora Petrović (1894–1962)
Zorina	Зорина	Čukarica	Žarkovo	?
Zorice Božović	Зорице Божовић	Voždovac	Jajinci, Mala Utrina	Resistance member Zorica Božović (1925–1941)
Zorke Manojlović	Зорке Манојловић	Voždovac	Banjica	Actress Zorka Manojlović (1929–2013)
Zorke Todosić	Зорке Тодосић	Čukarica	Stari Železnik	Actress and singer Zorka Todosić (1864–1936)
Zrenjaninski Put	Зрењанински пут	Palilula	Blok Braća Marić, Blok Branko Momirov, Blok Grga Andrijanović, Partizanski Blok; Blok Sava Kovačević, Blok Sutjeska, Dunavski Venac, Krnjača	Town of Zrenjanin
Zrmanjska	Зрмањска	Čukarica	Banovo Brdo, Čukarica	Zrmanja river, Croatia
Zuke Džumhura	Зуке Џумхура	Zemun	Altina	Author Zuko Džumhur (1920–1989)
Zvečanska	Звечанска	Savski Venac	Autokomanda, Maleško Brdo	Town of Zvečan
Zvezdarska	Звездарска	Zvezdara	Zvezdara Forest	Neighborhood of Zvezdara
Zvezdarskih Jelki	Звездарских јелки	Zvezdara	Zvezdara II	Fir trees planted in the vicinity
Zvonka Milenkovića	Звонка Миленковића	Zemun	Gornji Grad	Folk musician Zvonko Milenković (1956-2008)
Zvonka Marića	Звонка Марића	Rakovica	Resnik	Physicist Zvonko Marić (1931–2006)
Zvornička	Зворничка	Savski Venac	Savamala	Town of Zvornik, Bosnia and Herzegovina

== Ž ==
Street	Original name	Municipality	Neighborhood	Named after
Žabljačka	Жабљачка	Zvezdara	Zeleno Brdo	Town of Žabljak, Montenegro
Žada	Жада	Palilula	Krnjača, Blok Sava Kovačević	Jade (gemstone)
Žagubička	Жагубичка	Zemun	Grmeč	Town of Žagubica
Žana Sibelijusa	Жана Сибелијуса	Čukarica	Banovo Brdo, Golf Naselje	Finnish composer Jean Sibelius (1865–1957)
Žanke Stokić	Жанке Стокић	Savski Venac	Gospodarska Mehana, Senjak	Actress Žanka Stokić (1887–1947)
Žarka Bokuna	Жарка Бокуна	Zemun	Batajnica, Crveni Barjak	Resistance member Žarko Bokun (1908–1943)
Žarka Jovanovića	Жарка Јовановића	Zvezdara	Orlovsko Naselje	Musician Žarko Jovanović (1925–1985)
Žarka Miladinovića	Жарка Миладиновића	Zemun, New Belgrade	Paviljoni	Politician and lawyer Žarko Miladinović (1862–1926)
Žarka Obreškog	Жарка Обрешког	Zemun	Batajnica	World War II resistance member Žarko Obreški (1891-1943)
Žarka Obreškog (1–2)	Жарка Обрешког (1–2)	Zemun	Batajnica	Žarka Obreškog Street (Žarka Obreškog 1 and Žarka Obreškog 2)
Žarka Trpkovića	Жарка Трпковића	Zvezdara	Mali Mokri Lug	Military medic Žarko Trpković (1874–1946)
Žarka Vasiljevića	Жарка Васиљевића	Čukarica	Novi Železnik	Author and director Žarko Vasiljević (1892–1946)
Žarka Vukovića-Pucara	Жарка Вуковића-Пуцара	Čukarica	Banovo Brdo	Combatant Žarko Vuković Pucar (1911–1944)
Žarkovačka	Жарковачка	Čukarica	Banovo Brdo, Golf Naselje, Košutnjak, Sunčana Padina	Neighborhood of Žarkovo
Žarkovački Breg	Жарковачки брег	Čukarica	Repište, Žarkovo	Žarkovački breg, local hillock
Ždralova	Ждралова	Palilula	Višnjica	Crane (bird)
Železnička	Железничка	Savski Venac	Savamala	Belgrade Main railway station
Železnička	Железничка	Zemun	Kalvarija, Novi Grad, Železnička Kolonija	Zemun railway station
Železnička Kolonija-Batajnica	Железничка колонија-Батајница	Zemun	Batajnica	Local settlement of the railroad workers
Železnička Kolonija-Zemun	Железничка колонија-Земун	Zemun	Železnička Kolonija	Local settlement of the railroad workers
Žel.Stanica Batajnica	Жел.станица Батајница	Zemun	Batajnica, Šangaj	Batajnica railway station
Žel.Stanica Beograd-Krug	Жел.станица Београд-Круг	Savski Venac	Savamala	Railway turntable at Belgrade Main railway station
Žel.Stanica Košutnjak	Жел.станица Кошутњак	Rakovica	Košutnjak	Košutnjak railway station
Žel.Stanica Makiš Ranžirna	Жел.станица Макиш Ранжирна	Čukarica	Železnik	Makiš marshalling yard
Žel.Stanica Novi Beograd	Жел.станица Нови Београд	New Belgrade	Block 42, Buvljak	New Belgrade railway station
Žel.Stanica Rakovica	Жел.станица Раковица	Rakovica	Rakovica	Rakovica railway station
Žel.Stanica Resnik	Жел.станица Ресник	Rakovica	Resnik	Resnik railway station
Žel.Stanica Topčider	Жел.станица Топчидер	Savski Venac	Topčider	Topčider railway station
Žel.Stanica Zemun Novi Grad	Жел.станица Земун Нови Град	Zemun	Železnička Kolonija	Zemun Novi Grad railway station
Žel.Stanica Zemun Polje	Жел.станица Земун Поље	Zemun	Plavi Horizonti	Zemun Polje railway station
Železnička Stražara-Batajnica	Железничка стражара-Батајница	Zemun	Batajnica	Local railway lookout
Železnička Stražara-Zemun	Железничка стражара-Земун	Zemun	Novi Grad	Local railway lookout
Željka Bijelića	Жељка Бијелића	Rakovica	Kneževac	Croatian War combatant Željko Bijelić (d.1991)
Željka Mihajlovića	Жељка Михајловића	Zemun	Vojni put II	Kosovo war soldier Željko Mihajlović (1979-1999)
Željka Šijana	Жељка Шијана	Rakovica	Kneževac	Kosovo War specialist operative Željko Šijan (1960–1998)
Željka Tonšića	Жељка Тоншића	New Belgrade	Dr Ivan Ribar	Painter and designer Željko Tonšić (1954-2014)
Žička	Жичка	Vračar	Crveni Krst, Zvezdara	Žiča monastery
Židovarska	Жидоварска	Zvezdara	Mali Mokri Lug, Zeleno Brdo	Archaeological site Židovar
Žike Markovića	Жике Марковића	Zemun	Batajnica	?
Žike Mesarovića	Жике Месаровића	Zemun	Zemun Polje	Resistance member Žika Mesarović (1921–1943)
Žike Mihajlovića	Жике Михајловића	Voždovac	Jajinci	Local administrator and knez Živko Žika Mihajlović (19th century)
Žike Pavlovića	Жике Павловића	Zemun	Altina	Film director and writer Živojin Pavlović (1933–1998)
Žike Stojkovića	Жике Стојковића	Voždovac	Kumodraž, Torlak	Head of the local community Žika Stojković (20th century)
Žikice Jovanovića	Жикице Јовановића	Voždovac	Voždovac	Combatant Žikica Jovanović Španac (1914–1942)
Žikice Jovanovića-Španca	Жикице Јовановића-Шпанца	Čukarica	Stari Železnik	doubled name; see above
Žikina	Жикина	Zvezdara	Mali Mokri Lug	?
Žirova	Жирова	Zemun	Sava Kovačević	Acorns (nut)
Žitna	Житна	Voždovac	Kumodraž	Cereals, in general
Žitomislićka	Житомислићка	Čukarica	Stari Cerak	Žitomislić monastery, Bosnia and Herzegovina
Živana Panića	Живана Панића	Čukarica	Stari Železnik	Železnik municipal president Živan Panić
Živana Saramandića	Живана Сарамандића	Čukarica	Košutnjak, Žarkovo	Opera singer Živan Saramandić (1939–2012)
Živka Davidovića	Живка Давидовића	Zvezdara	Cvetko, Mali Mokri Lug, Učiteljsko Naselje	Army officer and benefactor Živko Davidović (1806–1904)
Živka Jovanovića	Живка Јовановића	Zvezdara	Mali Mokri Lug	Journalist and lawyer Živko Jovanović (1888–1923)
Živka Karabiberovića	Живка Карабиберовића	Zvezdara	Đeram	Mayor Živko Karabiberović (1830–1893)
Živka Nastića-Babe	Живка Настића-Бабе	Čukarica	Žarkovo	Long-distance runner Živko Nastić (1880–?)
Živka Petrovića	Живка Петровића	Zemun	Kalvarija	Painter Živko Petrović (1806–1868)
Živke Matić	Живке Матић	Zemun	Batajnica, Šangaj	Actress Živka Matić (1923-1998)
Živojina Ćuluma	Живојина Ћулума	Zemun	Zemun Polje	Astronomer and physicist Živojin Ćulum (1911–1991)
Živojina Lazića	Живојина Лазића	Čukarica	Žarkovo	Soldier Živojin Lazić (1893–1986)
Živojina Žujovića	Живојина Жујовића	Zvezdara	Đeram	Socialist Živojin Žujović (1838–1870)
Živorada Đukića	Живорада Ђукића	New Belgrade	Ledine	Engineer Živorad Đukić (1901-1995)
Živorada Grbića	Живорада Грбића	Voždovac	Banjica	Musical educator and composer Živorad Grbić (1892–1954)
Živorada Nastasijevića	Живорада Настасијевића	Zvezdara	Mali Mokri Lug	Frescos and icons painter Živorad Nastasijević (1893–1966)
Živorada Pavlovića	Живорада Павловића	Čukarica	Stari Železnik	Pediatrician Živorad Pavlović (1905–1979)
Živorada Žike Mitrovića	Живорада Жике Митровића	Rakovica	Resnik	Film director Žika Mitrović (1921–2005)
Živote Marinkovića	Животе Маринковића	Voždovac	Kumodraž, Torlak	Local soldier Života Marinković
Živote Stepanovića	Животе Степановића	Voždovac	Jajinci	?
Žorža Klemansoa	Жоржа Клемансоа	Stari Grad	Dorćol, Stari Grad	French politician Georges Clemenceau (1841–1929)
Žrnovska	Жрновска	Voždovac	Selo Rakovica	Žrnov fortress
Žrtava bombardovanja	Жртава бомбардовања	New Belgrade	Ledine	Victims of historical bombings of Belgrade (1941, 1944, 1999)
Župa	Жупа	Voždovac	Jajinci	Former kafana "Župa"
Župana Časlava	Жупана Часлава	Savski Venac	Topčider, Topčidersko Brdo	ruling prince Časlav Klonimirović (890–960)
Župana Pribila	Жупана Прибила	Zemun	Batajnica	Župan Pribil (14th century)
Župana Vlastimira	Жупана Властимира	Savski Venac	Dedinje	Ruling prince Vlastimir (805–851)
Žute Bukve	Жуте букве	Zemun	Kalvarija, Franjine Rudine	Yellow beech (tree)

== List of squares and plateaus ==
Square	Original name	Municipality	Neighborhood	Named after
Akademski Plato	Академски плато	Stari Grad	Studentski Trg	Rectorate and faculties of the University of Belgrade ("Academic Plateau")
Avijatičarski Trg	Авијатичарски трг	Zemun	Donji Grad	Air Force Command Building ("Aviators Square")
Cvetni Trg	Цветни трг	Vračar	Vračar	Flower shops located on the square
Ćošak Radivoja Koraća	Ћошак Радивоја Кораћа	Stari Grad	Obilićev Venac	Basketball player Radivoj Korać (1938–1969) (cf. Radivoja Koraća)
Školski Trg	Школски трг	Zvezdara	Staro Mirijevo	Former "Old School", now a library
Šumadijski Trg	Шумадијски трг	Čukarica	Čukarica	Region of Šumadija (cf. Šumadijska)
