= Isidor Stojanović =

Isidor Stojanović (Kanjiža, 1809 - Belgrade, 12 June 1849) was Professor of General History and Rector of the Lyceum of the Principality of Serbia from 1840 to 1841 and 1845 to 1846.

== Biography ==
Born in 1808 in Bačka. He finished elementary school at his place of birth, and high school and Lyceum in Szeged. He studied law at the University of Pest. At the invitation of Prince Miloš Obrenović, as a third-year student, he came to Serbia in 1835. He was the first Professor of Poetry in the Gymnasium in Kragujevac, and Professor of General History at the Lyceum from March 1839 to June 1849 while also taking the rectorship on two occasions in 1840 and 1845. He wrote Brzoukij Bukvar, a primer for the scholastic year 1846 and beyond.

He was a member of the Society Of Serbian Letters since 1842, a member of the Educational Board (Odbor Prosveštenija), a member of the Deputation of the Principal Fund of the School Administration, and a deputy of the Lyceum at the St. Peter's Day Assembly in Kragujevac, held 29 June 1848. He was one of the founders of the Weekly Adult Literacy School. He wrote poems, articles on Serbian history (Skull Tower) and translated literary and scholastic works from German. He wrote for Zabavnik, Urania, Podunavka, Serbian newspapers, Newsletter of the Society Of Serbian Letters and other chronicles and scholastic journals. He also described

He was collecting and gathering sources for the history of the First Serbian Uprising. Part of this material was published separately in books II and III of the Gazette of the Society Of Serbian Letters.

He died of cholera in Belgrade on 12 June 1849.
