= Kolonija Zmaj =

Coordinates: 44°49′58″N 20°22′43″E

Kolonija "B" Zmaj or colloquially Zmaj (Serbian Cyrillic: Колонија "Б" Змај) is an urban neighborhood of Belgrade, the capital of Serbia. It is located in Belgrade's municipality of Zemun.

== Location ==
Kolonija "B" Zmaj is located in the southwestern section of urban Zemun. It spreads between the Belgrade-Novi Sad railroad (north) and the Belgrade-Zagreb highway (south, border to the municipality of Novi Beograd), and borders the neighborhoods of Novi Grad and Železnička Kolonija on the north and Blok 50, the northernmost extension of Bežanijska Kosa, on the east.

== Characteristics ==
The neighborhood developed around the Zmaj factory, once famed Yugoslav producer of combine harvesters, tractors and other agricultural machines. Only the eastern section of the neighborhood is residential, while central and eastern parts are occupied by the factory and its large depots and auxiliary complexes.

Jugopetrol's gas stations Zmaj 1 and Zmaj 2, on both sides of the highway, are one of the most frequented in Belgrade. Belgrade's major wholesale open market is located just south of the neighborhood.

After the main street in this part, the eastern section of the neighborhood is also known as the "Joze Šćurle" settlement.
