= Novi Grad, Zemun =

Novi Grad Нови Град
- Urban neighbourhood
- Location within Belgrade
- Coordinates: 44°51′N 20°22′E
- Country: Serbia
- Region: Belgrade
- Municipality: Zemun
- Time zone: UTC+1 (CET)
  - Summer (DST): UTC+2 (CEST)
- Area code: +381(0)11
- Car plates: BG

Novi Grad (Serbian: Нови Град) is an urban neighborhood of Belgrade, the capital of Serbia. It is located in Belgrade's municipality of Zemun.

== Location ==
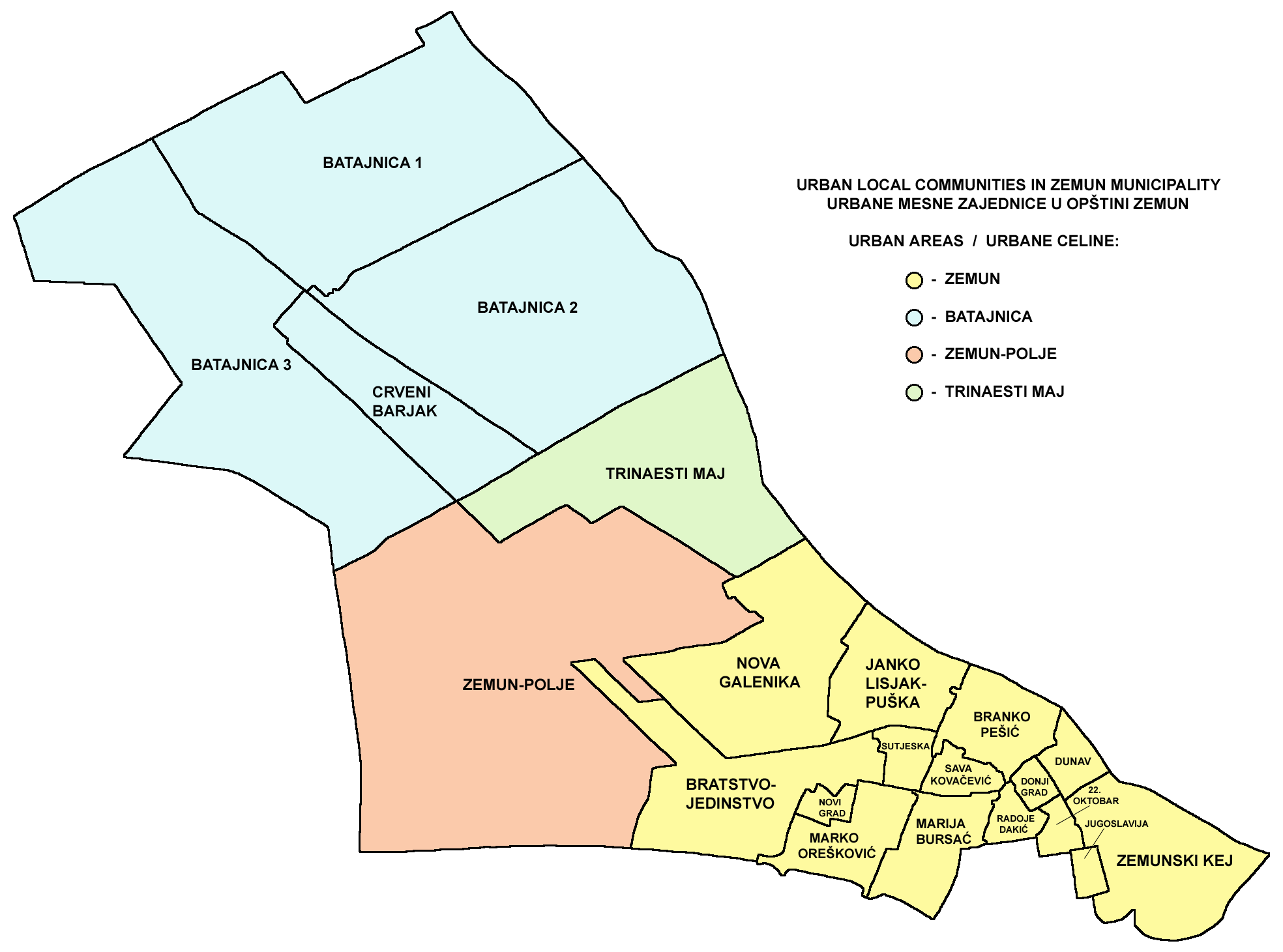
Map of Urban local communities in Zemun municipality

Novi Grad is located in the central-west section of the urban Zemun. It stretches along the starting section of the new Belgrade-Novi Sad highway, from the Belgrade-Novi Sad railway on the south, where it borders the neighborhood of Kolonija Zmaj to the Ugrinovačka street on the north, where it borders the neighborhood of Zemun Bačka. On the east it borders the neighborhoods of Železnička Kolonija and Sutjeska, while it extends into the neighborhoods of Altina and Plavi Horizonti on the west, until whose rapid development in the late 1990s Novi Grad was the final residential extension of Zemun (and Belgrade) in this direction. It also comprises sub-neighborhoods of Vojni Put I and Vojni Put II.

== Characteristics ==
The name simply means "new town", as a reference to the two older sections of Zemun, Donji Grad (lower town) and Gornji Grad (upper town). In 2002 census of population it had 19,158 inhabitants, out of which 4,982 lived in a local community (mesna zajednica, municipal subdivision) of the same name.

The neighborhood is close to several important traffic routes, including two highways (Belgrade-Novi Sad and Belgrade-Zagreb), one railway (Belgrade-Novi Sad) and some of the most important streets of Zemun (like Ugrinovačka and Prvomajska). It has its own railway station (Zemun-Novi Grad).

== Sub-neighborhoods ==
=== Franjine Rudine ===
In the 1970s and 1980s failed attempt was made to rename the part of the neighborhood between the highway to Zagreb and Prvomajska street to Franjine Rudine (Franjo's turfs) but the name fell into total oblivion today.

=== Vojni Put I ===
Triangularly shaped northern section of Novi Grad, on both sides of Belgrade-Novi Sad highway, bounded by the roads of Dobanovački put and Pazovački put. It directly continues into Altina on the north-west. The name means "military road (I)".

The neighborhood originated as an informal Romany settlement. In time it expanded as a regular settlement and got fully urbanized.

=== Vojni Put II ===
Southwestern section of Novi Grad, across the Belgrade-Novi Sad highway. It continues into the neighborhood of Plavi Horizonti in the west.
