= Železnička Kolonija =

Železnička Kolonija Железничка Колонија
- Urban neighbourhood
- Location within Belgrade
- Coordinates: 44.8369°N 20.3725°E
- Country: Serbia
- Region: Belgrade
- Municipality: Zemun
- Time zone: UTC+1 (CET)
  - Summer (DST): UTC+2 (CEST)
- Area code: +381(0)11
- Car plates: BG

Železnička Kolonija (Serbian Cyrillic: Железничка Колонија) is an urban neighborhood of Belgrade, the capital of Serbia. It is located in Belgrade's municipality of Zemun.

== Location ==
Železnička Kolonija is located in the southwestern section of the urban Zemun, on the Belgrade-Novi Sad railroad. It borders the neighborhood of Novi Grad on the north and Kolonija Zmaj on the south while in the east it extends into the neighborhood of Kalvarija.

== History and characteristics ==
The neighborhood was built in 1929 for railway workers and families in Belgrade, as an initiative from Laza Đorđević, a retired member of Serbia's Ministry of Transport; the name "Železnička Kolonija" translates literally to "Railway Colony." By 1932, the neighborhood had 75 homes, and by 1937 150 homes, at which point approximately 1,200 people lived there.

Železnička Kolonija was designed along the characteristics of Ebenezer Howard's "garden city" model, with abundant green space and orchards. A school was constructed in 1933, followed by restaurants and small businesses, as well as a police station in 1936. After World War II, the urban fabric of the neighborhood was severely disrupted by the addition of vertical extensions to many old homes and the construction of high-rise residential businesses. Architects Mihailo Čanak and Aleksandar Đokić attempted in the late 1970s and 80s to unify the original design of the "garden city" with the push for expanded housing in the neighborhood through expanding the greenery, using red brick in construction, and the "Košutnjak" crafts center opened in 1986.
