= Nikad izvini =

Serbian political satire television show

- Genre: Comedy, Satire
- Created by: Srđan Ćešić
- Starring: Srđan Miletić; Srđan Jovanović; Oliver Đaja
- Country of origin: Serbia and Montenegro
- Original language: Serbian
- No. of seasons: 1 completed, 1 uncompleted +never aired episodes (2006–2009)
- No. of episodes: cca 200

Production
- Executive producers: Srđan Ćešić; Katarina Španić-Ostojić
- Running time: cca 3 minutes
- Production companies: TV Pink; Media Global Agency

Original release
- Network: TV Pink
- Release: August 2003 – April 2005

Related
- VIP; Iz nepoznatih razloga

Nikad izvini (English: Never Sorry) was a Serbian political satire television show with elements of surrealism. It ran every day on Pink television, between August 2003 and April 2005, following the Pink afternoon news. In September 2008, after being off the air for three years, it was announced that the show would be returned to the air, however, this has yet to be confirmed.

== Creation ==
Srđan Ćešić, the show's scriptwriter and director, had the idea for the project as early as 2000, following the overthrow of Slobodan Milošević, a time when the media in Serbia began promoting freedom of speech, and allowing more open criticism of the government. A key inspiration for Nikad Izvini was British puppet show Spitting Image, which ran on Central Independent Television from 1984 tol 1996.

The show's creators claimed to have offered it to both RTS and TV B92, but were refused on both occasions. Finally, at the beginning of 2003, the creators signed a contract with the popular but frequently criticised TV Pink network. Project was joined by puppet designers Roko Radovanović and Miroslav Lakobrija, puppet animators Cvetin Aničić, Sanela Milošević, Petar Konkoj, violent and aggressive Hana Peterski, Goran Filipaš and Marija Malbaša. The main actor was theatre Atelje 212's Srđan Miletić, who performed almost all roles, with assistance of his colleagues, Srđan Jovanović and Oliver Đaja. Series were promoted at the beginning of August 2003, what was followed by first air, on 10 August.

== Plot and chronology ==
=== 2003 ===
The show initially covered the final months of ex-Prime minister, Zoran Živković government, featuring its crucial members- Vladan Batić, Milan St. Protić, Nebojša Čović, Dragoljub Mićunović, Prime minister himself, and others. Their main opposition (as in reality) was Vojislav Koštunica, as well as members of Serbian Radical Party- Tomislav Nikolić and Aleksandar Vučić. Some other important characters included Slobodan Milošević, Vojislav Šešelj, Vuk Drašković, and to-be president of Serbia Boris Tadić. Soon, the government fell due to many problematic affairs and the show predicted opposition success in the next parliamentary election. Before a winter pause, a New year 2004 special, called "Cabaret" was aired, around 9 PM CET, on 31 December 2003. It was created as an allusion to the film of the same. Approximately 30 minutes of material has been made, but due to network's rich schedule for New Year's Eve, only 15 minutes were broadcast (the complete episode is featured on first DVD, published in 2006). In this episode, government was represented by its powerless leader, while Koštunica, his successor, was presented as "special" guest. It is notable that members of nationalist Serbian Radical Party were singing Serbian comical versions of Nazi songs from the original film.

=== First half of 2004 ===
After a short winter break, show was resumed. Mentioned political changes in Serbia were completed. Although new Prime minister was Vojislav Koštunica, series presented its vice-president Miroljub Labus as de facto leader. He has been shown as only rational person, which is often getting upset by other politicians. Ironically, he is inseparable from character of Mlađan Dinkić, his assistant, shown as retarded. Vuk Drašković is struggling for preservation of Serbian traditionalism, making comical situations, in which he learns English and trying to translate Serbian epical songs to it. Velimir Ilić is presented as vulgar and badly behaved person. Some of old characters were Slobodan Milošević and Vojislav Šešelj. Ivica Dačić, Milošević's vice-president was also important character, as he was in reality giving needed parliamentary support to Koštunica's Government. Ćešić had an idea to make allusion to some popular serials, including Star Wars, The Matrix, The X-Files, as well as South-American "soap"-series, which are very popular in Serbia. In Nikad izvini, one was called "Tandarella", and Koštunica was shown as main female character. „Koštunica`s Serbia seemed to me as some surrealistic anti-utopia of Hieronymus Bosch...", mentioned Ćešić in a 2009 interview. Summer of 2004 marked the end of first season. During summer holiday, Boris Tadić (already important character in series), became a president of Serbia. Some other politician also became important.

=== Second half of 2004 and first half of 2005 ===
Second season was premiered in late summer of 2004, and production was continued on the very same tempo. Bogoljub Karić, infamous Serbian tycoon and candidate on Serbian presidential election, 2004, became important political figure, so he was featured in serial as the best friend of Ilić. Second New Year special was called "The Untouchables in curve of Spacetime", and this time, characters were shown as favourite Eliot Ness (Labus), and his incapable colleagues (Koštunica, Tadić, Drašković). They are trying to prevent smugglers of dangerous „Jujubana" whiskey (Karić and Ilić). When Koštunica turns back his pocket-watch, whole day before, 31 December 1932, is repeated. At the end, Ness managed to find what the problem is and has broken that watch. However, both he and his colleagues are already put in Sing-Sing prison.

=== Sudden cancellation of TV broadcast ===
At the beginning of April 2005, "Pink" aired the most controversial episode called "Hamlet". In the episode, the politicians are shown as a very bad theatre-troupe, in which only Labus can distinct real life from the performance— Shakespeare's Hamlet. The fact that provoked public anger was the feature of deceased Serbian Prime minister Zoran Đinđić as a ghost. At the same time, ghost is also featured among the politicians in the audience (all characters were "doubled" – they are shown both as the audience, as well as the actors on scene).

On the very same day, supported by some other political organizations, Demokratska Stranka (whose leader was Đinđić) condemned this episode and required cancellation of series. On the following day, "Pink" suddenly cancelled the series due to "low ratings". This could not be explained, because servers of "Pink" and "Nikad izvini" web addresses were cluttered, following massive traffic. Two days later, the show was resumed; however, less than a week later, the series was permanently cancelled. Months later, producers claimed that "Pink" put the series on "stand-by", although it had a rating of a million viewers per day.

=== Video editions ===
Months after the cancellations, some episodes were available on the Nikad izvini website In March 2006, Media Global Agency and First Production began publishing a set of 4 DVDs featuring the best episodes. First one included 46 episodes, of which two were later recorded (partially animated, because puppets were pulled back due to TV cancellation): „Amfilohije" and „All people of Prime Minister", as well as "behind the scene" photo gallery. As far as 2007, all 4 DVDs were published.

=== Unreleased TV resumption ===
In an interview to Politika TV review published on 26 September 2008, program producer of TV Pink, Tanja Vojtehovski announced that Nikad izvini would be resumed to program. Certain number of new episodes has been recorded and is available through YouTube, however, until present day, it has not been aired, with lack of an official explanation. In an interview given to Serbian week-magazine "Standard" from mid-2009, Ćešić made a comment: „When friend of mine told me about sketch, in which owner of Delta Holding sings Everybody Кnows (with which new season of Nikad izvini should have begun), that he would not air it too, if he has a TV station, I answered that probably I wouldn't either... I never blamed television for cancellation. Responsibility for that state of mass media is up to creators of "time spirit", or in German, "Zeitgeist". In our case, those are limited politicians, or persons behind them". Ćešić's latest project, „Iz nepoznatih razloga“("For unknown reasons"), was also cancelled from some networks, and available only online.
