= Delta City =

Delta City is a brand of shopping center, with malls in Belgrade, Serbia and Podgorica, Montenegro.

== Delta City Belgrade ==
Delta City Belgrade
- Location: Novi Beograd, Belgrade, Serbia
- Opened: 1 November 2007
- Manager: Delta City
- Num. of stores: 130
- Num. of anchor tenants: 3
- Floor area: 30.000 m^{2} (322.92 sq ft)
- Floors: 3
- Parking: 1,200
- Website: www.deltacitymalls.com

Delta City Belgrade's construction began on 22 March 2006. Designed by the architecture firm MYS, the project cost €74 million. It opened on 1 November 2007.

Delta City Belgrade is located in New Belgrade's Blok 67. With floor area of 87,000 m^{2}, it is the first shopping mall of its size in Serbia. Its total gross leasable area is 30,000 m^{2}. Some of the stores in the mall are H&M, Zara, Calvin Klein Underwear, Adidas, Sport Vision, Fashion & Friends, N fashion, Bershka, Sephora, CT shop, Pull and Bear, Tom Tailor, Massimo Dutti, Stradivarius, Tezenis, Geox, and Office Shoes.

The mall also includes 15 restaurants and three restaurant chains: Kentucky Fried Chicken, McDonald's and Monument.

Austrian Cineplexx operates multiplex cinema with eight screens. There is also cafés, fast food courts, children's playgrounds, and 130 retail units. The largest tenant is Super Maxi supermarket. In total, there are over 1,200 parking places on five decks above the ground, and one underground.

The mall is located on the same block as Belville. Delta City can serve 200,000 people within a 10-minute walk, and 600,000 within a ten-minute drive.

== Delta City Podgorica ==
Delta City Podgorica
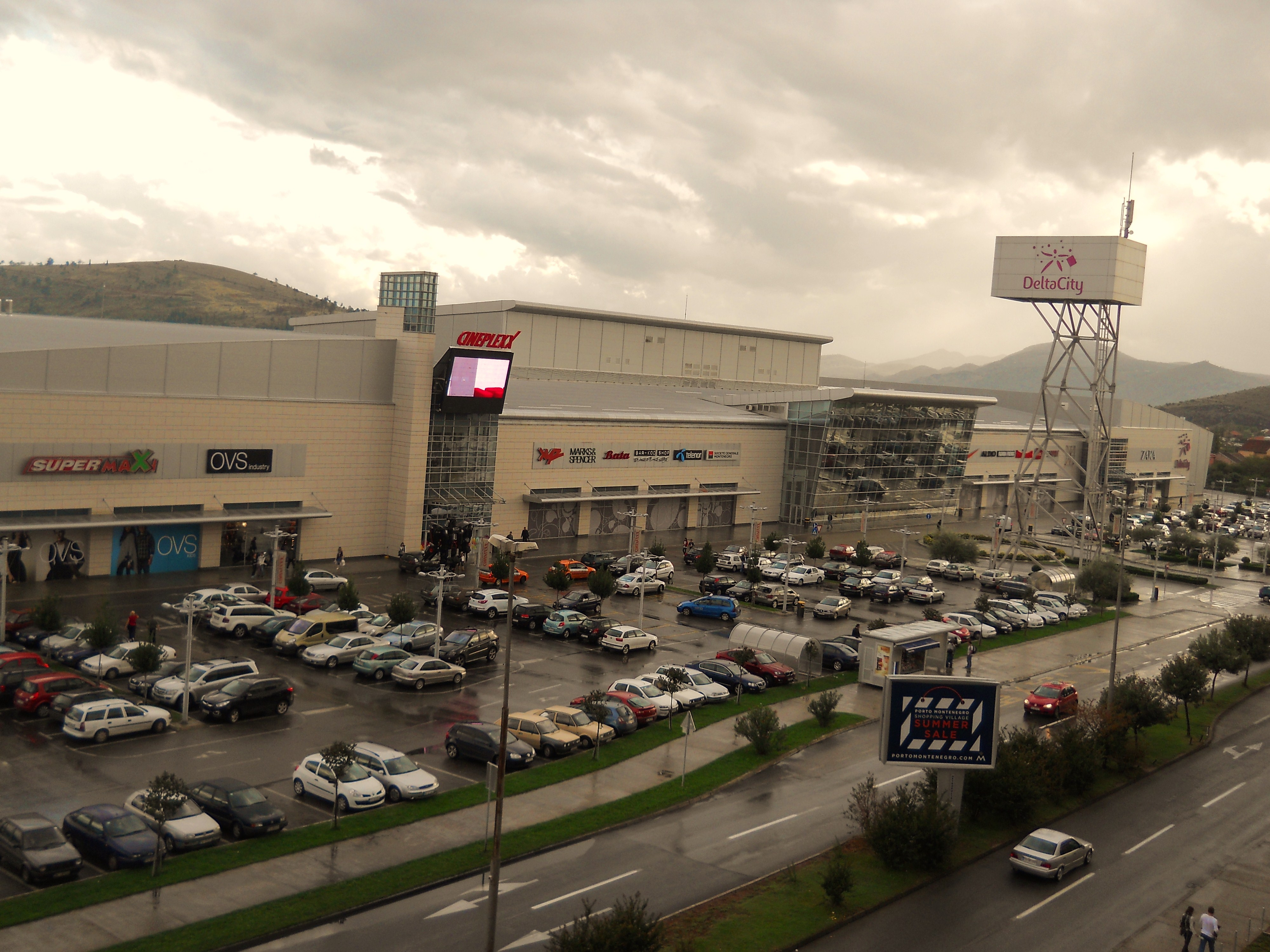
- Delta City mall in Podgorica, Montenegro.
- Location: Podgorica, Montenegro
- Opened: October 1, 2008
- Manager: Delta City
- Num. of stores: 75
- Num. of anchor tenants: 3
- Floor area: 48,000 m^{2} (520,000 sq ft)
- Floors: 2
- Parking: 1,000
- Website: www.deltacity.me

Delta City Podgorica is the first and the largest shopping mall in Podgorica. It was built at a cost of €60 million, and was opened on October 1, 2008.

The mall is built in the new part of Podgorica, on the junction of roads towards Cetinje and Nikšić. It has a total floor area of 48,000 m^{2}, with gross leasable area of 24,000 m^{2}.

The prominent stores are similar to that of Belgrade mall: Nike, Zara, Mexx, Marks & Spencer, Tommy Hilfiger, Mango, Esprit, Oysho, Bershka, Pull and Bear, Stradivarius, Tally Weijl, Geox, Nine West, Guess, NewYorker, Office Shoes, and more.

What Podgorica mall is lacking is international food chains, so there is no Kentucky Fried Chicken or McDonald's, but there is a Costa Coffee outlet. The mall also features some local brands of fast food restaurants.

Mall also features a Cineplexx 6 screen multiplex cinema, and largest supermarket in Montenegro, Super Maxi. A large garage that spans the length of the mall at its back, and open parking in front make up for some 1,000 parking spaces.

Delta City Podgorica is the first large shopping mall in Montenegro, and it probably will not face competition from mall of similar size in Podgorica soon, with the possible exception of Mall of Montenegro.

== Delta Planet Autokomanda ==
Delta Planet
- Location: Belgrade, Serbia
- Opened: TBA
- Developer: Delta Holding
- Manager: Delta City
- Owner: Delta Holding
- Num. of stores: 250
- Num. of anchor tenants: TBA
- Floor area: 200,000 m^{2} (2,200,000 sq ft)
- Floors: TBA
- Parking: 2.300
- Website: TBA

Delta Planet is a planned shopping mall, to be built and operated by Delta Holding in Belgrade, Serbia. Delta Planet is planned to be the largest shopping mall in the Balkans, from 200,000 m^{2} (2,200,000 sq ft). This is double the "Delta City" and the 40,000 m^{2} (430,000 sq ft) larger than "Usce". Or, in other words measured, it is an area of 24 football fields (105 times 68 meters, according to the standards laid down by UEFA). Commencement of works is planned for end of 2012 and the completion of the shopping mall in the second half of 2014.

In the building will be invested 200 million euros and will be completed in the fall 2014th year.

New design is presenting us with a center of 200,000 square meters of total area with 250 different shops. Shops, services, restaurants and cafes are spread on two levels with a simple communication around the building. Below these two levels there will be a hypermarket, and on the top level is located a part designed for entertainment with cinema, spa and wellness area, various sports facilities and a similar offers for fans of healthy living.

A special feature is a large green garden that will be located on the roof, covering an area of 6,500 square meters. In addition, it will hold the first IMAX theater in Serbia, as well as 50 completely new brands on Serbian market. All visitors will have 2300 parking spaces at their disposal, whether it's underground garage or outdoor parking.

== See also ==
- MPC Properties
- Maxi (Serbian supermarket)
- Mall of Montenegro
