= Sava City =

Coordinates: 44.811446°N 20.435021°E

Sava City Savograd
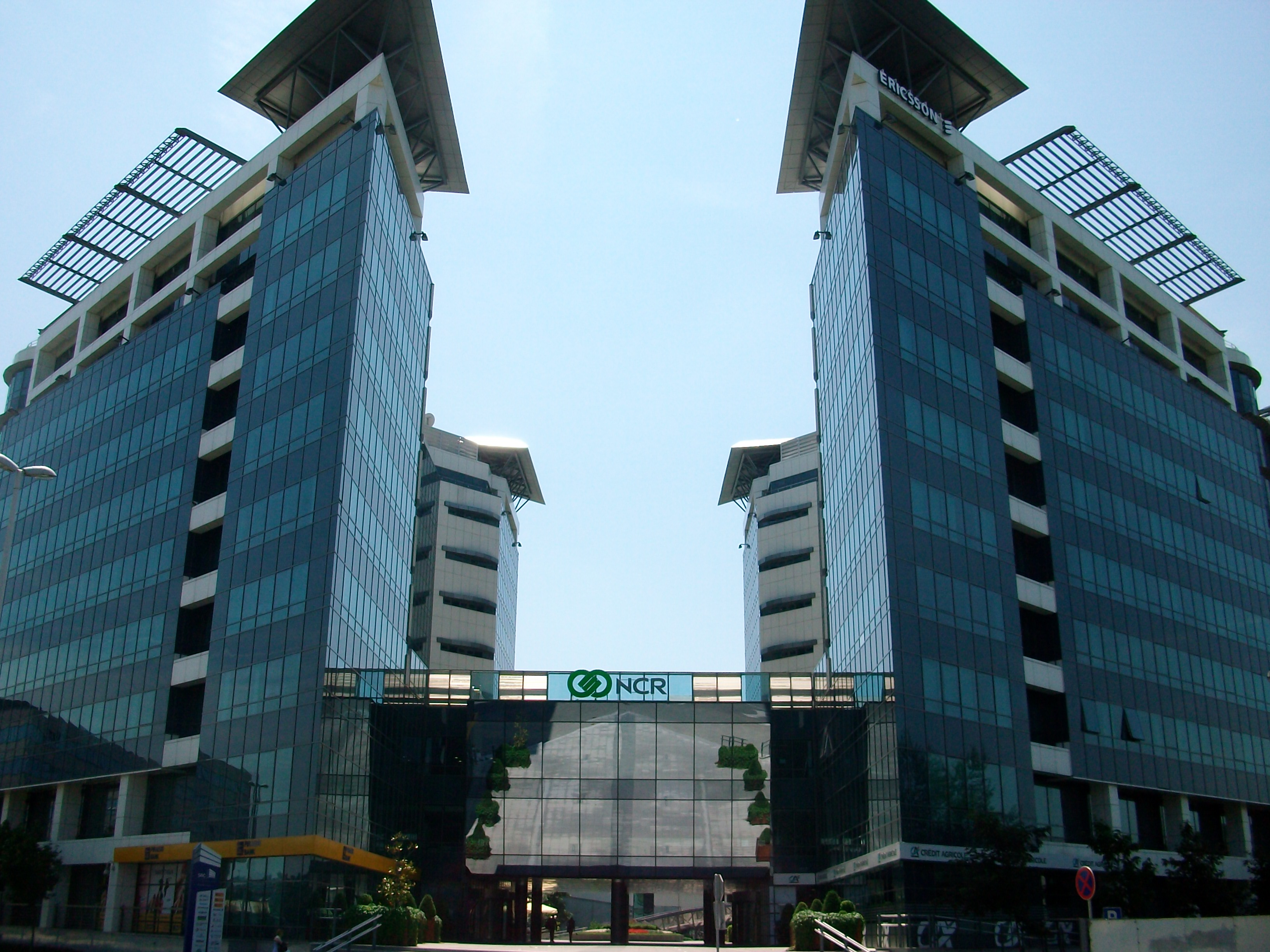

- Location within Belgrade

General information
- Type: Commercial, residential
- Location: Belgrade, Serbia
- Completed: June 2010
- Owner: CA Immo

Technical details
- Floor count: 13
- Floor area: 35,000 m^{2} (380,000 sq ft)

Design and construction
- Architect: DOMA doo Beograd

Sava City, or Savograd (Serbian: Савоград), is a commercial and residential complex in Belgrade, the capital of Serbia. With the neighboring architectural landmarks, it forms the first elite residential and business area in the city.

== Location ==
Savograd is located in the Block 19 in the municipality of New Belgrade, between the streets of Milentija Popovića and Vladimira Popovića. Right across the street, in the Block 20, is the Hyatt Regency Belgrade hotel.

== History ==
Savograd is a project of the architects Mario Jobst and Miodrag Trpković, who won the competition in 2004. Construction of the complex began in 2006 and was finished in June 2010.

== Architecture ==
Total floor covers an area of 35,000 m^{2} (380,000 sq ft), of which 12,000 m^{2} (130,000 sq ft) are residential. Total constructed area is 55,000 m^{2} (590,000 sq ft). The complex consists of three slanted towers, connected at the ground floor level and by the underground garages. Two of the towers are commercial while the third is completely residential with three apartments on each floor with 78 to 215 m^{2} (840 to 2,310 sq ft) each. The connecting ground floor is widely expanded and, as the interspace between the towers, consists of big and small atriums, park-style bridges, flower pergolas, cascade plateaus and lawns, resembling the Japanese gardens. The roof is grid-shaped.

Savograd is fitted into the larger urban area, which consists of the Blocks 19 and 20 and encompasses the buildings in the modern, glass and steel, style. The complex includes:

Block 19

- Sava Centar
- Crowne Plaza Belgrade
- Genex apartments
- Delta Holding building

Block 20

- Hyatt Regency Belgrade
- NIS building
- unfinished headquarters of the "Rad" construction company

Architect and theorist Mihajlo Mitrović, who projected many buildings in Belgrade (Western City Gate), in his review of the complex wrote that "Savograd is now in the gravity center of the artistic triangle Hyatt-Sava Center-Genex apartments" and that it "fitted perfectly with the neighbors into the imposing mosaic entirety in the city's most beautiful sequence".

Delta Holding became proprietor of the almost entire Block 19: Delta Holding building was built in 2003, Genex apartments, Crowne Plaza and tennis hall were purchased in 2008 and Sava Centar was acquired in November 2020. Delta Holding building was sold to the Banca Intesa in 2013. Delta Holding began construction of its new headquarters, between the Genex apartments and Crowne Plaza in February 2020. After acquiring Sava Centar, Delta Holding announced construction of several other buildings, including the 100 m (330 ft) tall Delta Center tower, next to Savograd. The tower will also host Hotel Intercontinental. Construction of the tower was announced for the end of 2022. The city officially allowed construction of the 100 m (330 ft) buildings in the Block 20 in September 2023.
