= Mall of Arabia Cairo =

Shopping mall in Cairo, Egypt

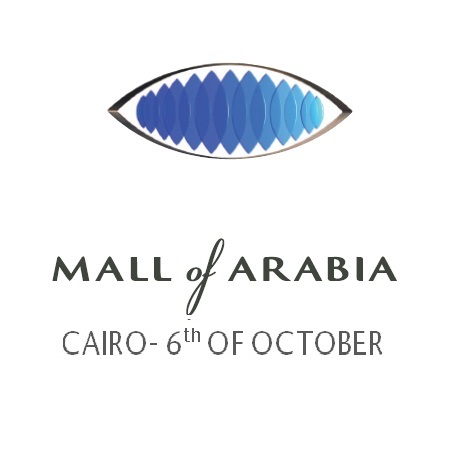

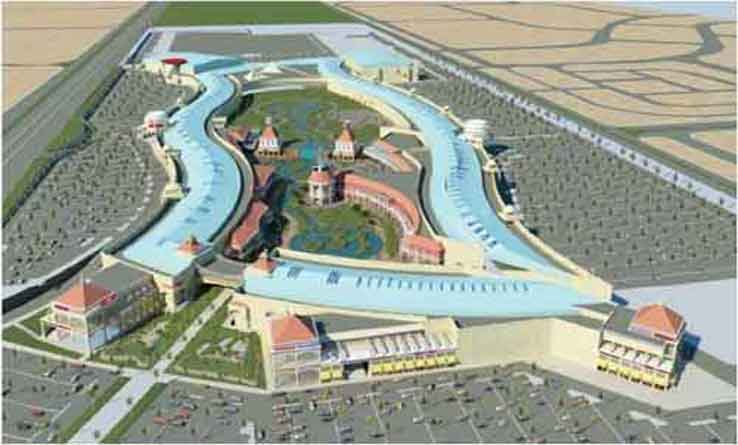

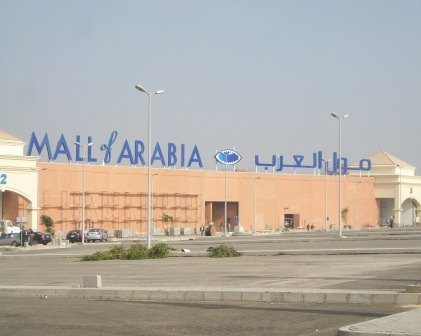

The Mall of Arabia (Arabic: مول العرب, "Arab Mall") Cairo is a shopping mall in 6th of October City (at the border of Sheikh Zayed City) in the western part of the Cairo metropolitan area in Egypt. It opened in 2010.

In 2014, the International Finance Corporation and the European Bank for Reconstruction and Development invested US$60 million in the mall ahead of its Phase II expansion.

Saudi developer Fawaz Alhokair Group created a subsidiary, Marakez, charged with developing the second phase of the Mall of Arabia Cairo, "The Expansion" measuring 40,000 ^{2} of gross leasable area. In addition, Marakez is to create new residential developments, food and beverage chains, and entertainment chains in Egypt.

Anchors include:

- Carrefour hypermarket
- Superstores Decathlon, dStore, Go Sport, Home Center
- IKEA, ca. 20,000 m^{2}, the second to open in Egypt
- Marks & Spencer
- supermarkets Seoudi and Spinneys
- Apparel superstores DeFacto and LC Waikiki (both Turkish companies); as well as H&M and Zara
- Galaxy Cineplex
- HC Furniture Mall
- Mall of Arabia mosque

The complex includes an 8-acre (32,000 m^{2}) park, "the Park".

The Gap opened its first store in Africa here in 2011.

The first Mercedes-Benz mall showroom in Egypt opened at Mall of Arabia Cairo in 2020.

In 2022, Turkish retailer Colin's entered the Egyptian market with a store in Mall of Arabia Cairo and three others.
