= Mall of Montenegro =

- Location: Podgorica, Montenegro
- Coordinates: 42.432061°N 19.262686°E
- Opened: September 23, 2010
- Owner: Gintaş
- Floor area: 58,000 m^{2} (620,000 sq ft)
- Floors: 3
- Website: mallofmontenegro.com

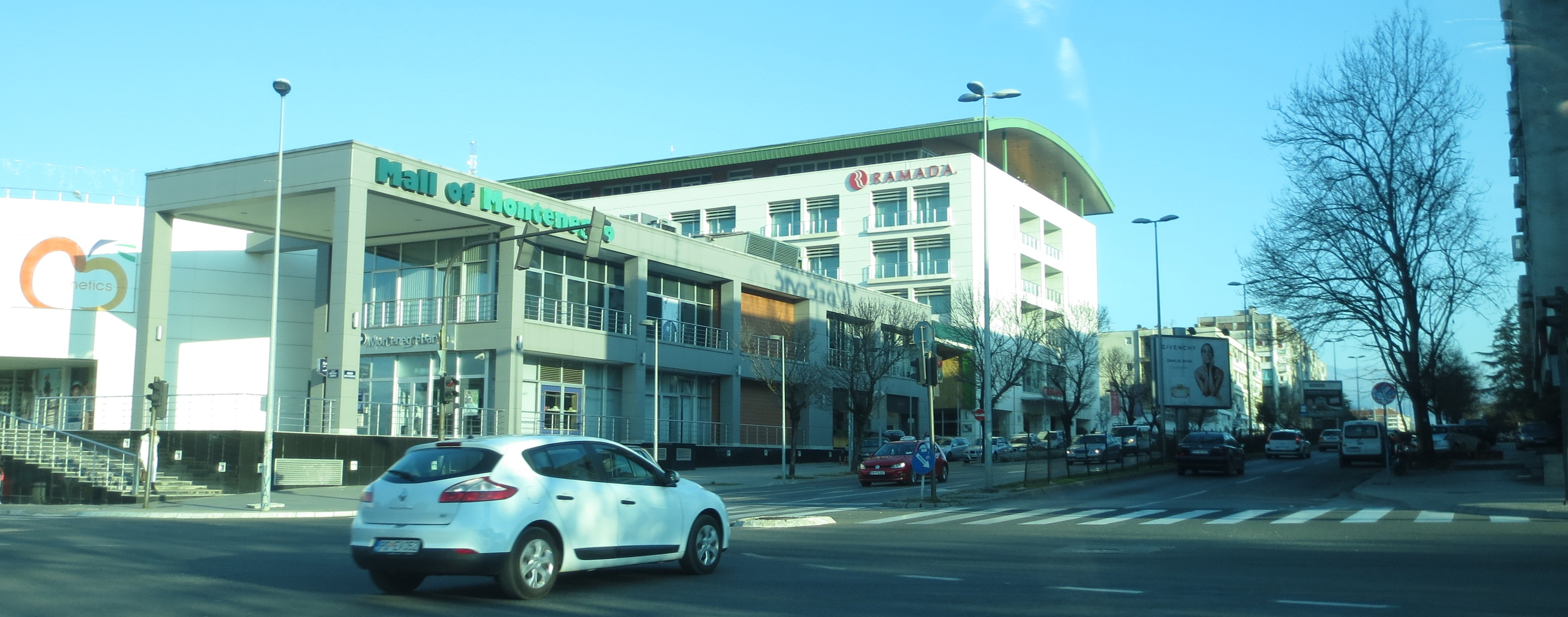
Mall of Montenegro, 2015

Mall of Montenegro is a shopping mall located in the Podgorica, Montenegro.

The mall is a complex featuring covered marketplace (the Green Bazaar), a Ramada hotel, and the shopping mall itself. The entire complex was built on the location of former open marketplace, as a public–private partnership between Podgorica Municipality and Turkish company of Gintaş.

The mall is located on Bratstva i Jedinstva street, which is also main north–south thoroughfare of Podgorica, and is a part of E65/E80 European routes. The entire complex has total floor area of 58,000 m^{2} (620,000 sq ft), while gross leasable area of the shopping mall is 17,000 m^{2} (180,000 sq ft).

Besides Green Bazaar, which is a natural anchor tenant, a large Mercator supermarket is the largest tenant. Prominent stores in the mall include Levi Strauss & Co., Sergio Tacchini, Office Shoes, Intersport and others. The mall also features a bowling alley, cafés, a fast food court, a playground, and an entertainment park. An underground parking garage serves the entire complex.

Although it is the largest shopping mall in Podgorica, in gross built area terms, it has had constant problems with vacancy since its opening, as Delta City shopping mall has already saturated the small Montenegrin market, and has a stronger presence of international clothing brands. Thus, Delta City is currently considered a more high end shopping mall.
