= Sava Centar =

- Сава центар
- Official logo

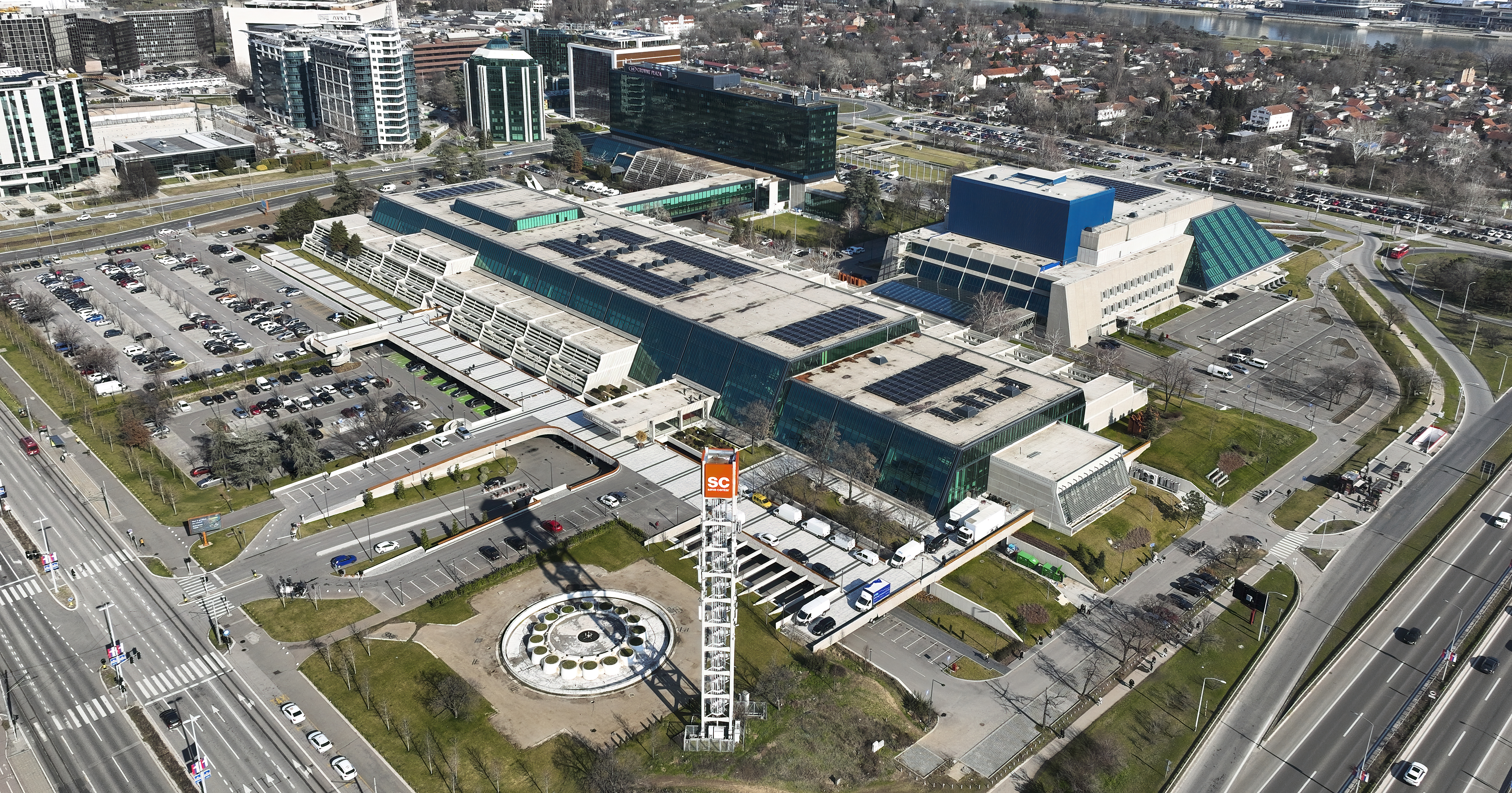
- View of Sava Center in 2025

- Location within Belgrade

General information
- Status: Congress Center & Performance venue
- Type: Congress center
- Location: Milentija Popovića 9, New Belgrade, Belgrade, Serbia
- Coordinates: 44°48′32″N 20°25′52″E
- Construction started: 1976
- Completed: 1979
- Opened: 1979; 47 years ago
- Owner: Delta Holding

Technical details
- Size: 100,000m^{2}

Design and construction
- Architect: Stojan Maksimović

Website
- www.savacentar.rs

Sava Centar (Serbian Cyrillic: Сава центар) is an international congress, cultural and business center of various multi-functional activities located in Belgrade, the capital of Serbia. It is the largest audience hall in the country and the entire former Yugoslavia, as well as one of the biggest in Europe. It has hosted numerous large-scale events and performances.

In April 2021, the building was declared a cultural monument.

== Location ==
Sava Centar is located in Block 19, in the municipality of New Belgrade. It is situated at 9 Milentija Popovića street. The complex is bounded by the streets of Vladimira Popovića to the east, Milentija Popovića to the west and Bulevar Arsenija Čarnijevića to the south. To the north are other buildings, which occupy the northern section of the Block 19, including Crowne Plaza Belgrade and Savograd.

== History ==
=== Origin ===
In 1975, after the First Conference of the Organization for Security and Co-operation in Europe, held in Helsinki, Finland, the President of Yugoslavia Josip Broz Tito accepted for Belgrade to host the next summit. However, Belgrade had no congressional facility which could welcome so many delegates, so it was decided to construct a new building. The author of the project, chief designer and team manager was Stojan Maksimović, who had only one month to submit the concept. He was chief designer of the Belgrade Construction Directorate and was given the task in March 1976, directly from Tito's office. Maksimović spent that month either in seclusion in his office in the City Assembly of Belgrade or on planes, visiting Paris, The Hague (Babylon), Copenhagen and Helsinki to inspect existing facilities of this type. The chief engineer was Radomir Mihajlović, Maksimović's colleague. The urban plan for the area was created by Miloš Perović.

=== Construction ===
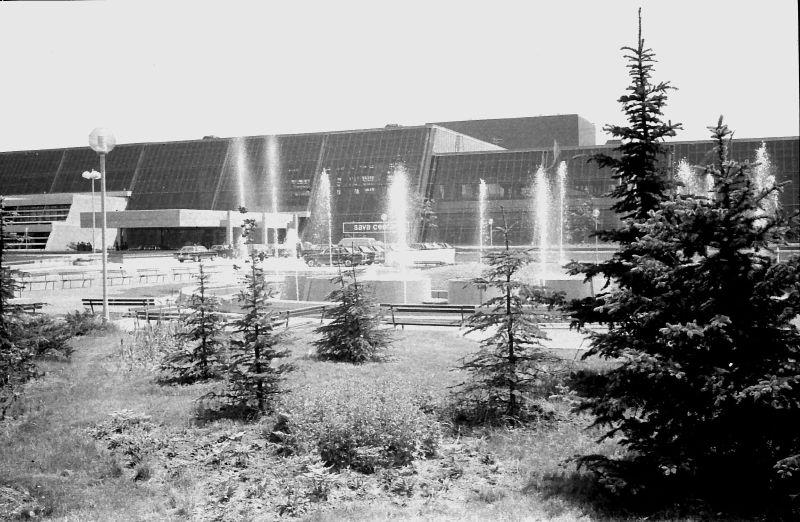
Sava Centar in 1978

Work began in April 1976 and after a bit over a year, the building was ceremonially opened on 14 May 1977 by Tito. Construction itself lasted 11 months. Work on the first stage had to be rushed due to the scheduled OSCE conference, planned for 15 June 1977. Today, this date is considered as the birthday of Sava Centar, even though it was technically only the opening of Block A, followed by Block 2 in 1978 and Block 3 in 1979. The second phase, a large performance and conference hall, opened for the 11th Congress of the League of Communists of Yugoslavia. The planned stage at the main hall, which had been envisioned as revolving, was scrapped and a fixed large stage was built instead. By 1979, Hotel Beograd InterContinental, now the Crowne Plaza Belgrade, was added to the complex to host the annual meeting of the World Bank. The interior was designed by Aleksandar Šaletić. Supporting infrastructure such as roads and highway connections were also built during this period around the Sava Centar complex.

The complex, due to its design and the speed by which it was finished, attracted international attention. It was among the nominees when the inaugural Pritzker Architecture Prize was awarded in 1979. Local press of the time named it a "spaceship", "a glass garden", "the beauty on the Sava", "a concrete ship of peace", "goodwill house", etc. As the initial construction period overlapped with the finishing works at the Centre Pompidou in Paris, the two structures were often compared at the time. While the famous Beaubourg was equally praised and criticized, Maksimović's work on Sava Centar was universally lauded.

=== Later developments ===
On 17 August 2006, the parking lot at Sava Centar was renovated to a capacity of 410 cars. As a result of the renovation, parking fees were introduced for the first time at Sava Centar but were lifted around 2016/2017.

In its jubilee year of 2007, when Sava Centar marked its 30th anniversary, substantial financing was utilized to reconstruct the glass facade. Furthermore, city authorities funded the reconstruction of broken glass on the sideways-facing facade, the acquisition of stage audio equipment for concert appearances and the replacement of seats in the main halls.

=== Failed privatization attempts ===
By 2017, the 40-year-old complex was in a bad financial situation. After it was built, investments into preserving and enhancing the complex were minimal. The city, which owned the facility, decided to find a strategic partner who would take 49% of ownership, while the city would retain 51% in the future joint company. The bidding was announced in 2016 and two companies, Delta Holding and a consortium headed by Belgrade's Nikola Tesla Airport showed interest. City authorities prolonged tender deadlines four times and decided to change some of the bidding conditions, so Delta Holding backed off. After the second bidding, the Airport also withdrew, without providing reasons. When the third bidding was announced in June 2017, no one applied. In November 2017 the city announced another bidding in the future, but ordered three public utility companies (Belgrade Power Plants, Public Cleaning and Belgrade Waterworks and Sewage) to write off all debts from Sava Centar, in order to make it more attractive for the buyers. The bidding was open in December, with the city asking for at least €12.5 million.

Despite debt write-offs, Sava Centar remained one of the Serbian companies with the highest tax debts, reaching 558 million dinars (€4.7 million) in early 2018. Delta Holding reappeared as an interested investor, claiming willingness to pay double what the city was asking for, €25 million. Their condition was to build a footbridge to the future Intercontinental Hotel, planned by Delta Holding in the vicinity, who would accept the venue's entire debt but split eventual profits with the city. Instead of announcing the bids, the city extended the deadline to 20 March 2018. Delta Holding was the only bidder, but their application was rejected as "incomplete", stating that Delta didn't specify how many employees it would keep. The commission executing the bidding recommended direct negotiations with the company, which the city administration accepted in July 2018, before changing its mind again in February 2019, opting for a concession, and then again in November 2019 when the city decided to sell the venue after all.

In January 2020 the city confirmed it will sell the complex at a starting price of €25 million, while the new owner would have to preserve the function of the venue and to invest €50 million in the next five years. In August 2020, the city conducted a bidding, raising the price to €27.4 million, and keeping the other stipulations.

By this time, architects, economists, citizens' groups and political opposition parties began to criticize the city's handling of the matter, especially in the summer of 2020 when a similar, failed process was conducted for another symbol of Belgrade, the Beograđanka skyscraper. The city itself appraised Sava Centar at €108 million in 2016, but constantly kept offering it for four to nine times less money, changing its mind and evading a deal closure. Opposition politicians openly accused the city administration of corruption and theft. They claimed that through repeated, failed bidding, the price of the venue kept being reduced each time, as allowed by the law, until it was sold to a tycoon close to the ruling establishment for a very low price.

On the other hand, some real estate consultants claimed that the city was asking too much for the venue. Miloje Popović, the first manager of the venue, said that the city was making a mistake by selling it, that they should devise the right policy for congressional tourism instead, as such buildings are never built to be commercial on their own, instead attracting thousands of people whose spending benefits the entire community. Some economists added that the city's claims of lacking funds to invest in Sava Centar were false, as the city administration was alleged to be wasting money elsewhere. The public also pressured the administration, calling it incapable of managing the building and opposing the sale.

On 22 August 2020, the city announced this last bidding failed, too, as no one had applied. Delta Holding stated they were still interested, but that almost €80 million of investments into the venue were too much. The city said it would probably repeat the bidding before the year's end, without clarifying if they would offer a 20% price reduction, as permitted. The designer, Maksimović, accused the city of mismanaging the venue and raised concern that the venue would change its purpose after being sold to a private owner. The city was also accused of never trying to manage the venue properly, with accusations of corruption and nepotism in management; failing to hire foreign management; a lack of serious financial injections based on detailed and worked-out recovery concepts; failing to find domestic and foreign patrons; failing to find partners through the European Congressional Cities network; neglecting to re-hire the original authors to fix architectural and structural problems.

=== Delta ownership ===
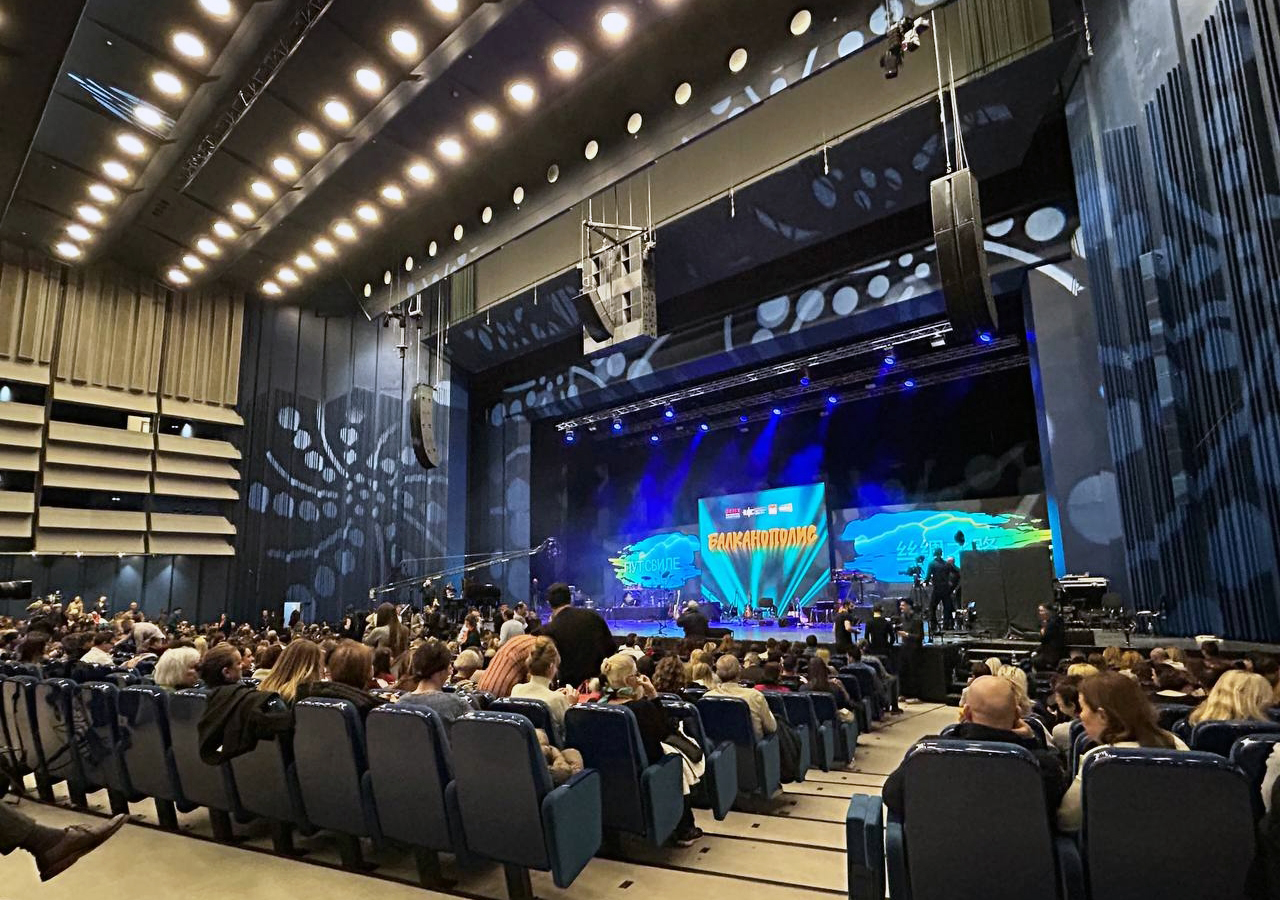
Blue hall, 2025

On 11 September 2020, the city offered the complex again, reducing the price to €21.9 million, without changing the required amount of future investment, but two weeks later this process failed as well, with nobody applying. After this, the city made another offer for an even lower €17.5 million on 19 October. Delta Holding applied as the sole bidder, finally purchasing the venue on 9 November 2020, and announcing an investment of €60 million, even higher than stipulated by the contract. Reconstruction was announced for late 2021.

Replacement of the facade was announced as the first task, starting at the end of 2021. Delta Holding announced that only foreign architects would be included in the reconstruction. Works were scheduled for completion in 2023, with the company expecting a return on its investment after 12 to 15 years. The company continues to claim the price was too high, even though it paid only €180 per square meter. Along with the building, Delta Holding acquired some 40 valuable works of art, including paintings, tapestries, sculptures, a clock installation, etc. Some of these would be restored during the reconstruction as they were damaged over time.

Some architects suggested that Sava Centar should be protected by law and declared a cultural monument, with the complex being placed under preliminary protection, meaning it should be treated as protected until a final decision on protection is made by the Institute for the Protection of Cultural Monuments. Five months after the venue was sold to the private owner, the government declared Sava Centar a cultural monument on 8 April 2021. When the City Assembly of Belgrade scheduled its 29 April 2021 session in the venue, due to COVID-19 pandemic restrictions, they referred to the structure as the "Delta Congressional Center, former Sava Centar". The management of Delta Holding reacted, stating that the name "Sava Centar" itself is a city symbol and brand of its own, and that it would not be changed.

The reconstruction of the building began on 23 December 2021, with an estimated deadline set for late 2023, or early 2024. Despite previous claims, all companies involved in the reconstruction were domestic. The main project was done by the Centroprojekt studio. The reconstructed venue is planned to resurface as the congressional hub of this part of Europe, with a hosting capacity of up to 7,000 visitors. The interiors will be changed to a certain degree, in accordance with Stojan Maksimović, the original designer. The center will consist of two, equally sized sections: a business-commercial section, and a congressional-cultural section. The seating capacity of the main, "Blue Hall", will be somewhat expanded. The congressional zone will have 45 rooms, instead of 16 as it had before. Delta Holding claimed in July 2022 that it already had booked congresses for late 2023 through 2025, and that total cost of the purchase, investment and renovation would be north of €90 million.

In January 2023, Delta Holding scheduled a partial reopening of the venue for November 2023. The congressional section, with 40 halls, is scheduled to be opened, including one immersive hall. The overall value of the renovation was again raised, to over €100 million. Congressional section was reopened on 14 November 2023, with Delta Holding claiming a total reconstruction investment of €118 million. The largest, Blue Hall, should be finished by the mid-2024.

== Structural details ==
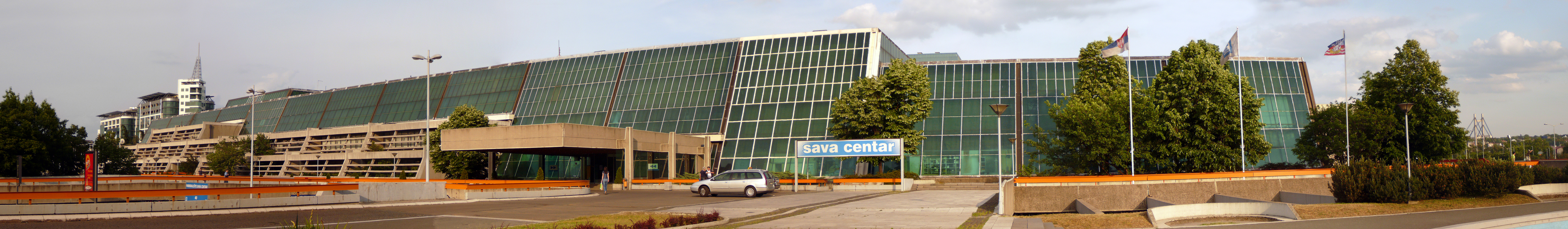
Panoramic photo of Sava Centar, before renovation

Sava Centar has 69,720 m^{2} (750,500 sq ft) of useful and 100,000 m^{2} (1,100,000 sq ft) of overall area, including a theatre hall with 4,000 seats, 15 conference halls, an exhibition area and a number of other facilities. It annually hosts more than half million visitors. Sava Centar is connected to Crowne Plaza Belgrade via an underground hallway. The complex includes restaurants, bars, offices and shops.

The building is situated on the easily accessible location. The great hall, nicknamed the Blue Hall due to its blue seats is the largest audience hall in the country with the above-mentioned 4,000 seats, both ground and upper level included. The hall has the ability to completely change its look depending on the stage set-up. As a result, the seats can be taken out. It is also the place major cinema premiers are hosted.

In terms of architecture, Sava Centar is fitted into the larger urban area, which developed later under its influence (especially the green glass facades), and consists of the Blocks 19 and 20, encompassing buildings in the modern, glass and steel, style. The complex includes:

- Block 19: Sava Centar, Crowne Plaza Belgrade, Genex apartments, Delta Holding building;
- Block 20: Hyatt Regency Belgrade, NIS building, unfinished headquarters of the "Rad" construction company;

Architecture of the object has been described as excellent, elegantly "landing" in the New Belgrade's lowlands. The venue was labeled as spacious, comfortable, airy and visitors friendly. Unlike the exterior, the interior was changed a lot since the construction was ended. The art critics hailed it for the modern design, sharp lines, unusual outline, wide spans of the construction, cascade terraces, concrete brise soleils, and visible, vividly colored architectural construction. It was noted that "hardly any other building... will communicate with the surroundings so perfectly".

== Events ==
Sava Centar has hosted among others Gennady Rozhdestvensky, Zubin Mehta, Valery Gergiev, Eiji Oue, Mstislav Rostropovich, Henryk Szeryng, Ivo Pogorelić, Vladimir Ashkenazy, Plácido Domingo, Montserrat Caballé, Johan Strauss Orchestra, Moscow Philharmonic Orchestra, The USSR Ministry Of Culture Orchestra, National Symphony Orchestra (NSO), Okazu Philharmonic Orchestra, Belgrade Philharmonic Orchestra, Metropole Orchestra, Miles Davis, Dizzy Gillespie, Nina Simone, Ray Charles, John Mayall & the Bluesbreakers, Jerry Lee Lewis, Julio Iglesias, Jeff Beck, Johnny Winter, Buddy Guy, Suzanne Vega, Nigel Kennedy, B.B. King, Lou Reed, Roxy Music, Jethro Tull, Sting, David Byrne, Simple Minds, Laurie Anderson, Samantha Fox, Jason Donovan, Slobodan Trkulja, Bilja Krstić, Gotan Project and Madredeus.

It also serves as the venue of the Miss Serbia competition, the Serbian Eurovision Song Contest selection music festivals, Beovizija and was the host place of the Jugovizija (in 1987).

Sava Centar has been the host of significant congress gatherings and artistic programs: Organization for Security and Co-operation in Europe, Annual General Meeting of the International Monetary Fund and the World Bank, 55th Annual General Meeting of Interpol, 6th United Nations Conference on Trade and Development, General Meeting of UNESCO, FOREX, FISIT and 9th Summit of the Non-Aligned Movement.

In January 1990, Sava hosted the 14th (and last) Congress of the League of Communists of Yugoslavia.

In total, from May 1977 to May 2017, over 35,000 events of all kinds were held in the venue, with a total of 15 million visitors, of that 10,000 congressional meetings with 2 million participants.

In June 2018, it held the 6th WordCamp Europe.

In December 2024, Croatian singer Jelena Rozga held the first of a record seven concerts in Belgrade's Sava Center. With these concerts, Rozga went down in history as the first performer to do so in the last 25 years.

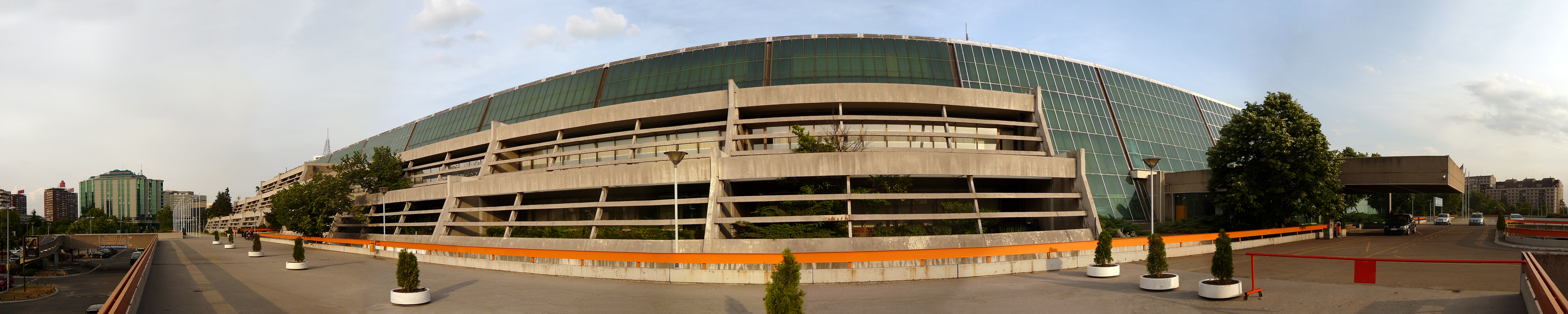
Sava Centar in cylindrical perspective, before renovation.
