= Vadim Gurinov =

Russian entrepreneur

- Вадим Гуринов
- Born: December 21, 1971 (age 54)
- Education: Saint Petersburg Institute of Fine Mechanics and Optics
- Occupations: entrepreneur, investor
- Organization(s): Fingular, Service-Telecom

Vadim Alexandrovich Gurinov (Russian: Вадим Александрович Гуринов, born 21 December 1971) is an entrepreneur and investor who is the founder of JSC Cordiant (tyre production) and Service-Telecom, an independent wireless telecommunication infrastructure operator).

== Early life and education ==
Vadim Gurinov was born on December 21, 1971.

In 1987, Gurinov graduated from high school with honors. In 1994, he graduated from the Saint Petersburg Institute of Fine Mechanics and Optics. In 1995, he also graduated from the Faculty of Economic Sciences at the Voznesensky Institute of Finance and Economics in Saint Petersburg (known as Saint Petersburg State University of Economics since 2012).

From 2005 to 2008, Gurinov received additional education, including the INSEAD Business School Executive Program (France) in 2008. In addition, he completed the Senior Executive Program at the London Business School and the Executive program at the Singularity University.

In 2010, Gurinov got a Ph.D. in sociology after defending his dissertation entitled The Implementation of Social Responsibility in the Management of Big Business in Modern Russia.

== Career ==
=== Early years ===
In 1991, Gurinov started his business in export-import operations and consumer goods trade. Together with his partners, he created the DealMakers company and a retail chain of denim stores selling clothes of the Turkish brand Colin's. In 1998, the business was sold.

In 1996, Gurinov was one of the founders of Petrosoyuz (formerly Petroimport), which produced grocery food. In 1999, he became the company's deputy CEO. In 2003, he sold his share in business to Heinz.

In 1999–2000, Gurinov founded the Lyubimiy Kray confectionary association and became its co-owner. Under his management, in 2002, the company became one of the leaders in confectionery production in Russia. Lyubimiy Kray had 450 employees. Gurinov sold his stake in the company in 2013. In 2001, Petrosoyuz's and Lyubimiy Kray's turnover increased to over $250 million.

=== Cordiant ===
From 2003 to 2011, Gurinov was the CEO of Sibur's subsidiary, Sibur-Russian Tyres. Prior to his appointment, Sibur's tyre business was unprofitable, and its organization was fragmented. Vadim Gurinov united these disparate business units under one holding company, bringing it to profit in 2006.

At the end of 2011, Gurinov reached an agreement with Sibur that Sibur-Russian Tyres's top managers would buy out the company. In December 2011, the deal was finalized. After that, Sibur-Russian Tyres was renamed into Cordiant, and Gurinov was appointed the company's Chairman of the board of directors. In 2021, Cordiant became the second largest player in the market.

In 2017, Gurinov transferred his shares in Cordiant to his wife, Galina Gurinova. Consequently, she became the company's controlling shareholder, and the company was considered a family asset.

A 100% stake in Cordiant was sold to S8 Capital Group in May 2023.

=== Service-Telecom ===
In 2015, Service-Telecom was founded, and Vadim Gurinov became its chairman of the board of directors. The company has expanded since 2015: while it owned 350 telecommunication infrastructure facilities in 2015–2016, their number increased by 18500 by 2022. Thus, Service-Telecom took 21% of the tower infrastructure market in Russia.

In 2025, Service-Telecom Group was reorganized as JSC Service-Telecom, with Russian entrepreneur and investor Artem Gurinov assuming the role of majority shareholder.

=== Fingular ===
Fingular is a Singapore-based independent financial group founded in 2021 by European entrepreneur Maxim Chernuschenko, with backing from Vadim Gurinov.

=== Other activities ===
In 2007, Gurinov became a member of SIBUR Holding's management board.

From November 2011 to August 2012, he was the CEO of Russian Sea - Dobycha (now the company is renamed Russian Fishery). As of 2013, he owned 12,6% of the company's shares.

Since 2009, Vadim Gurinov has been a shareholder of AvestraGroup, an independent supplier of petrochemical products from Russia to foreign markets with representative offices in the UAE, Switzerland, and Finland.

In 2015, Gurinov invested in creating interregional centers for sterilizing technologies that would provide next-generation sterilization services in various industries, including medicine, agriculture, and automotive component manufacturing.

In 2017, he became a member of the Board of Directors of the Arkhangelsk Experimental Seaweed Plant. In 2021, Technical Hemp Processing Technologies (owned by Galina and Vadim Gurinov) acquired almost 27,5% of Nizhny Novgorod Hemp Fibers LLC. Furthermore, Gurinov invests in fintech projects (neo-banking, online registers) that are implemented at the first stage in South-East Asia (Vietnam, Indonesia, Sri Lanka, Malaysia). He is also an investor in a marketplace project in African countries.

His investment portfolio also includes investments in premium real estate in central London and highly liquid suburban locations in the United Kingdom.

== Personal life ==
Gurinov is married to Galina Nikolayevna Gurinova. They have three children.
