= Service-Telecom =

- Type: Private
- Founded: 2015
- Key people: Nikolai Berdin, Galina Gurinova, Dmitry Sokov, Olga Berdina
- Website: service-telecom.net

The Service-Telecom Group of Companies is an independent wireless telecommunication infrastructure operator that constructs and leases antenna-mast structures (AMS) to place telecom equipment.

== History ==
Service-Telecom entered the market in 2015. The company installed radio masts and cell phone towers on roads in the Moscow region the same year. Service-telecom also signed build-to-suit (BTS) contracts with the mobile companies MegaFon and Tele2. The company's services covered Moscow, the Moscow region, Saint Petersburg, and the Northwestern Federal District. From 2015 to 2016, Service-Telecom built 350 infrastructural objects and began operations in Southern Russia and the Ural region. The company also signed a project financing agreement with Gazprombank.

In 2017, Service-Telecom acquired a majority stake (100%) in Link Development, the first tower company in Russia. After the deal was signed, Service-Telecom owned more than 1000 towers. Mikhail Alexeev, a partner of AC&M Consulting, estimated the value of the transaction at between 600 million and 1 billion rubles. Yuri Brukvin, the Director General of the Rostelecom analytical agency, described Link Development as a highly marginal business and estimated its value at 3 billion rubles minus debt, amounting to about 400 million rubles.

In 2017, the Service-Telecom Group of Companies was created to provide a platform for the construction of wireless communication infrastructure in Russia.

In 2019, the group of companies acquired TekhnoResurs. Service-Telecom entered the Volga Federal District market the same year.

In 2020, Service-Telecom implemented several projects using the infrastructure of PJSC Rosseti and Avtotor. These projects included the installation of Service-Telecom towers across the M11 highway (also known as "Neva"), the company placed 103 telecommunications infrastructure facilities and 356 5G-ready cell sites of four federal mobile phone operators (MegaFon, Beeline, MTS, and Tele2).

In 2021 Service-Telecom acquired Neva Telecom, which owned 250 cell towers in Northwest Russia. Alexander Vengranovich, an analyst of Renaissance Capital, estimated the deal's value at between 750 million and 1 billion rubles.

After having secured the approval of the Russian Federal Antimonopoly Service in December 2021, Service-Telecom completed the acquisition of Veon's tower assets (the owner of the National Tower Company through VimpelCom). The deal amounted to 70,65 billion rubles on a debt-free basis, together with deferred payments. The deal included a 100% stock sale of the National Tower Company (NTC), which owned about 15400 mobile cell towers in Russia. In April 2022, the deal was recognized as the "Telecom Deal of the Year" by the Russian M&A. It was the first major deal in the history of the Russian telecom market: the purchase of the cellular MNO's towers led to an overall change in the market.

In December 2022 Service-Telecom acquired two regional tower companies - «Opora Telecom» and «Dacha na Svyazy», which together own 500 towers in the Voronezh, Penza, Leningrad, and Belgorod regions, and in St. Petersburg. The deal allowed Service-Telecom to increase its portfolio to 19 100 sites.

== Activity ==
The Service-Telecom Group of Companies is an independent wireless telecommunication infrastructure operator. It constructs and leases antenna-mast structures (AMS) to place telecom equipment.

Russian federal mobile phone operators - Beeline, MTS, Tele2, and MegaFon - represent about 99% of the company's total revenue.

According to SPARK-Interfax, in 2016 the company's revenue reached 64,9 million rubles, while its net loss was 96 million. In 2020 Serviсe-Telecom's revenues were 436,6 million, and net profit was estimated at 110 million. As of 2022 the Serviсe-Telecom Group of Companies includes the National Tower Company, Link Development, TekhnoResurs, and Neva Telecom.

In October 2021, Tele2 installed 100 additional mobile phone base stations on Service-Telecom's structures along the M-11 Neva highway, which connects Saint Petersburg with Moscow. The new equipment provided a mobile signal in intermittent service areas along the 669km road, which runs through the Moscow, Tver, Novgorod, and Leningrad regions.

As of 2022, Service-Telecom holds 21% of the Russian tower market. Owning about 18500 facilities, the company operates throughout Russia, with its headquarters being located in Moscow and Saint Petersburg. Service-Telecom is included in the government's list of systemically important organizations.

The key metric for valuing mobile infrastructure companies is the average number of tenants or operators sharing cell tower infrastructure. The rate depends on the average number of tenants per tower (tenancy ratio, TR). According to AC&M Consulting, as of February 2022, a standard TR for telecom operators is 1,1-1,2. For Service-Telecom, it is 1,9; in some regions, TR reaches 2,5-3,5.

== Owners and management ==
In 2015–2017 the company was owned by the City Capital (50%) and Swedish Ruric AB (publ) (50%) investment funds.

In 2017 the “Service-Telecom” Group of Companies was created.

In 2017–2019 shares in the group of companies were distributed as follows: Ruric AB (publ) - 50.2%; City Capital - 33%, Dmitry Sokov - 13.4%; Olga Berdina - 3.4%.

Since 2020 Galina Gurinova, the wife of Vadim Gurinov, who is the founder of Cordiant, has owned 75% of the company. Dmitry Sokov, the chairman of the Board of Directors of Cordiant, owns 20% of the company. Olga Berdina, Nikolai Berdin's wife, holds the other 5%. Nikolai Berdin is the CEO of Service-Telecom.
