= Delta DMD =

Serbian company of Delta Holding

- Native name: Делта ДМД
- Company type: d.o.o.
- Founded: 26 December 2006; 19 years ago (Current form); 1997; 29 years ago (Founded)
- Headquarters: Belgrade, Serbia
- Area served: Serbia; Montenegro
- Key people: Lazar Petrović (Director)
- Revenue: ▲€82.92 million (2017)
- Net income: ▼€0.23 million (2017)
- Total assets: ▲€66.53 million (2017)
- Total equity: ▲€24.52 million (2017)
- Owner: Delta Investment d.o.o. (55.84%); Hemslade Trading Limited (44.16%)
- Number of employees: 341 (2017)
- Parent: Delta Holding
- Website: www.deltadmd.rs

Delta DMD (Serbian Cyrillic: Делта ДМД), a subsidiary company of Delta Holding, is an importer and wholesaler of food and beauty products with headquarters in Belgrade, Serbia. It is also operating in neighboring Montenegro. It was founded in 1997, and has around 340 employees.

In cooperation with the company Beiersdorf, for which Delta DMD is the exclusive distributor, it imports and distributes Nivea face and body care products, as well as Hansaplast products. In the sphere of foodstuffs Delta M operates as general importer and distributor of Ferrero confectionery in the territory of Serbia. The sales program of this sector includes the products of Perfetti Van Melle, Buitoni, Danone and Unilever.
