= Silverfleet Capital =

British private equity firm

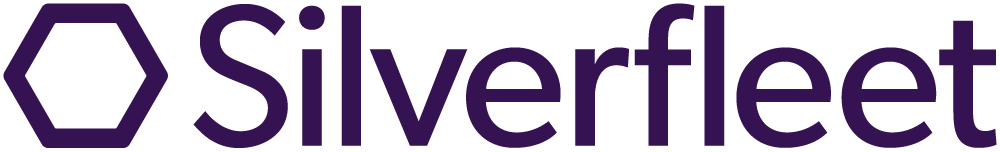

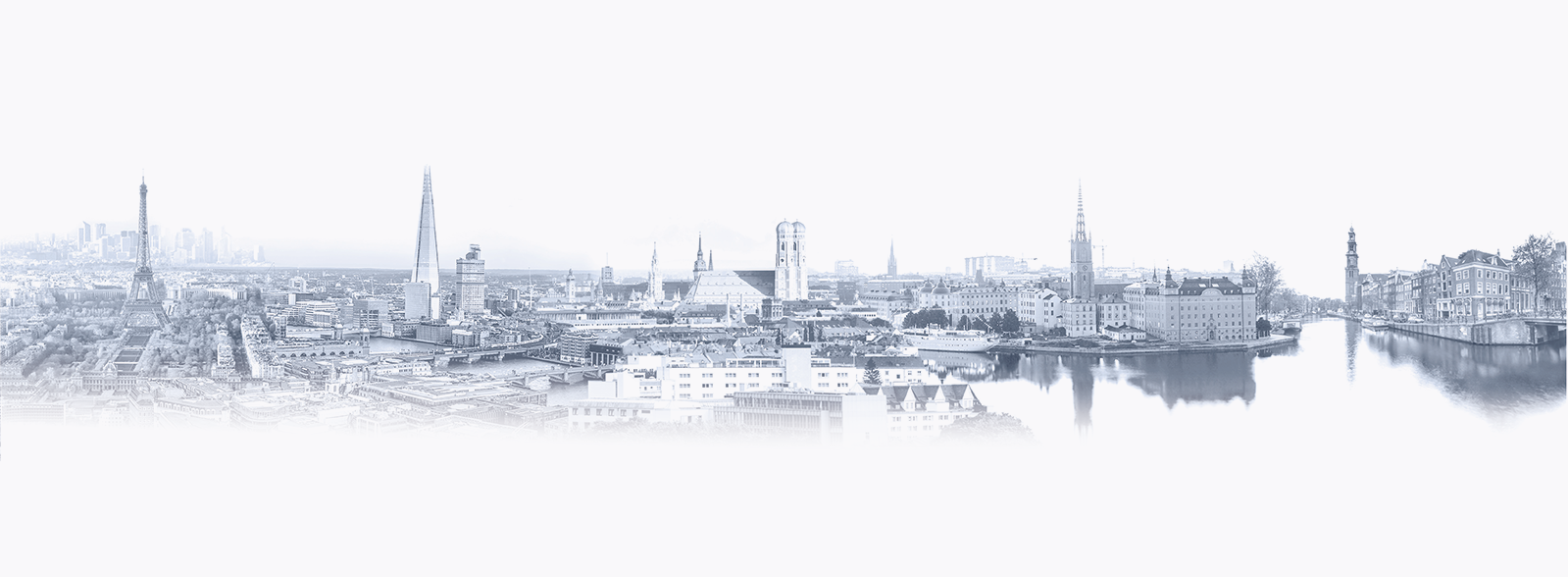
- Type: Limited liability partnership
- Industry: Private equity firm
- Founded: 1985; 41 years ago
- Headquarters: London, United Kingdom
- Products: Private Equity Funds, Leveraged buyouts
- Number of employees: 7 (January 2025)
- Website: www.silverfleetcapital.com

Silverfleet Capital is a regionally focused European mid-market private equity firm.

Silverfleet is an independent firm, owned by its partners, and invests on behalf of a diversified group of international institutional investors. Silverfleet Capital specialises in mid-market private equity investment, in international companies operating in a number of different countries, where there is an opportunity to accelerate growth from buy and build and roll-out strategies. It invests across four sectors: healthcare, services, consumer and manufacturing.

In August 2006, Silverfleet Capital Partners LLP was established.

In October 2010, in a secondary buyout for an undisclosed amount, Silverfleet acquired Schneider Group, a German catalogue and online retailer of branded promotional and home furnishing goods, from Barclays Private Equity.

In 2014, Silverfleet backed SPAC Mirror Bidco in its acquisition of AGR Holdings AS from AGR Group ASA.

In June 2015, Silverfleet acquired the Danish clothing company Masai. In November 2015, Silverfleet sold the British footwear retail chain Office to South African fashion retailer Truworths for £256m, achieving a 3.4 x return on its 2010 purchase from Scottish entrepreneur Tom Hunter.

In 2016, Silverfleet Capital sold meat product casings manufacturer Kalle Group to investors managed by Clayton, Dubilier & Rice (CD&R). Silverfleet had acquired a majority stake in Kalle Group in 2009.

In November 2017, Silverfleet Capital sold Berlin based Competence Call Center Group (CCC) back to Ardian, formerly AXA Private Equity. Silverfleet had acquired a majority share from Ardian four years earlier in 2013. In December 2017, Silverfleet acquired a majority stake in Riviera Travel, a river cruise and tour operator focused on the "over-55s".

In July 2021, Silverfleet abandoned its fundraising for its third fund refocusing on follow-on investments and realizations of its portfolio.

A majority stakeholder in German Pumpenfabrik Wangen for five years, Silverfleet sold its stake to Atlas Copco for an undisclosed amount in 2022. In July 2022, Silverfleet sold Prefere Resins, a company specializing in phenolic and melamine resins acquired in 2018 from Prefere Resin management, capiton AG and Intermediate Capital Group, to US private equity firm One Rock Capital Partners.
