= Crowne Plaza Belgrade =

Hotels in New Belgrade, Serbia

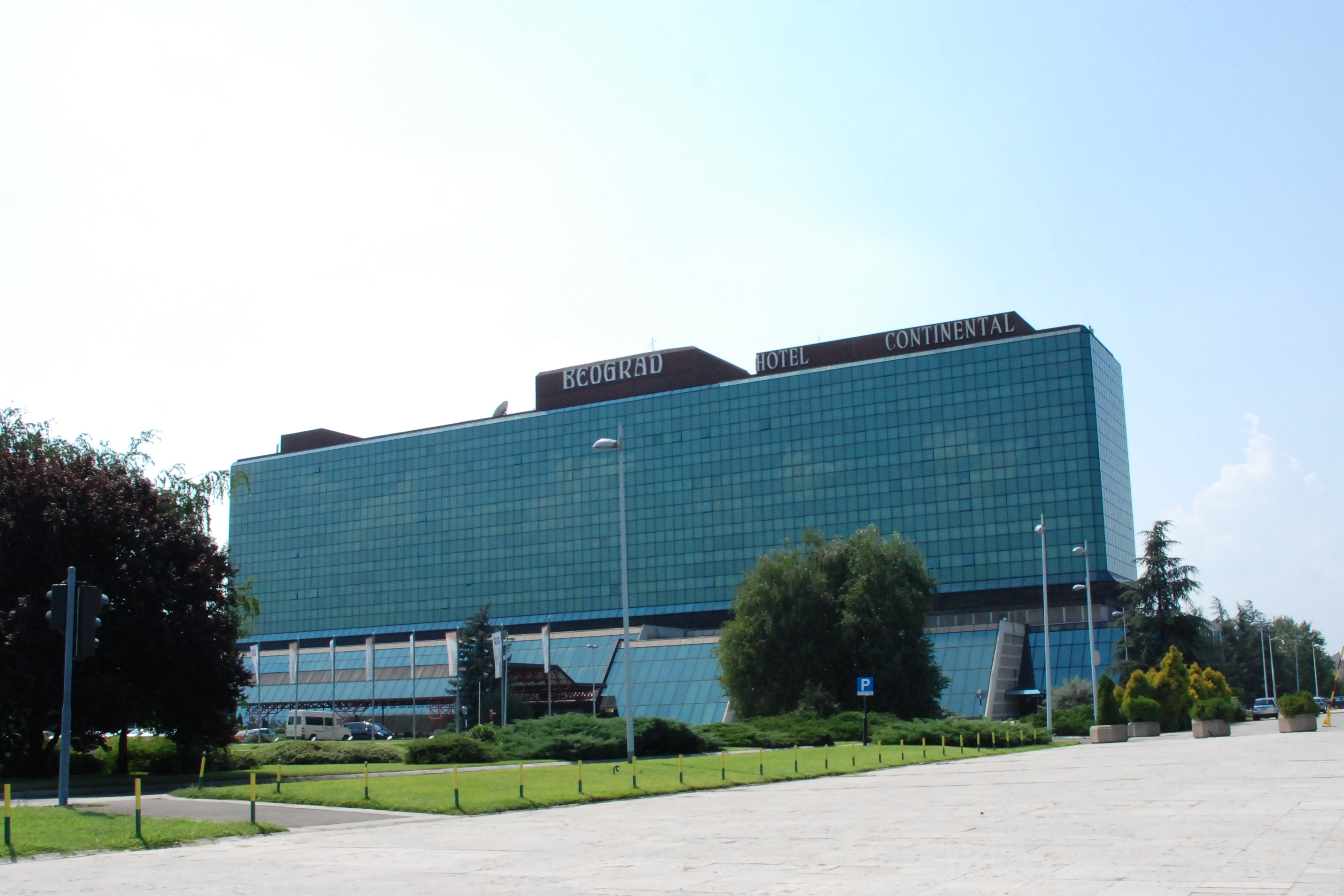
- The hotel in August 2009

- Location within Belgrade
- Former names: Hotel Beograd InterContinental (1979–2006); Hotel International CG (2006–2007); Continental Hotel Belgrade (2007–2012)
- Hotel chain: Crowne Plaza

General information
- Location: New Belgrade, Serbia, Vladimira Popovića Street 10; Belgrade 11000
- Coordinates: 44°48′34″N 20°26′02″E
- Opening: October 1979; 47 years ago
- Renovated: 2003, 2012–2013
- Owner: Delta Holding
- Operator: Delta Holding

Design and construction
- Architect: Stojan Maksimović

Other information
- Number of rooms: 387
- Number of suites: 29
- Number of restaurants: 2

Crowne Plaza Belgrade is a four-star hotel located in New Belgrade, Serbia. With its 387 rooms and 29 suites, it is the biggest hotel in the city in terms of capacity.

Opened in 1979 after being built with state funds provided through the Generaleksport (Genex) foreign trade company led at the time by the state-appointed CEO Miki Savićević, the hotel originally operated as Hotel Beograd InterContinental, part of the InterContinental chain.

As Genex fell on hard times throughout the 1990s and especially in the 2000s, it failed to honour the hotel's franchising terms, which led to the loss of the franchising license in 2006.

Afterwards, the hotel re-branded as Hotel International CG for a brief period followed by Continental Hotel Belgrade, in both instances without a foreign brand affiliation, before getting sold to Miroslav Mišković's Delta Holding conglomerate in 2008. Mišković kept the existing setup until striking a deal with InterContinental Hotels Group (IHG) about using their Crowne Plaza brand. The hotel closed in July 2012 to undergo a major renovation effort before re-opening as Crowne Plaza in December 2013.

== Location ==
Crowne Plaza is located in Novi Beograd on the Sava river left bank. Venues and sites of interest located in its immediate vicinity are the Sava Centar congress hall, Štark Arena, Ušće Tower, and Gazela Bridge.

== History ==
=== Hotel Beograd InterContinental ===
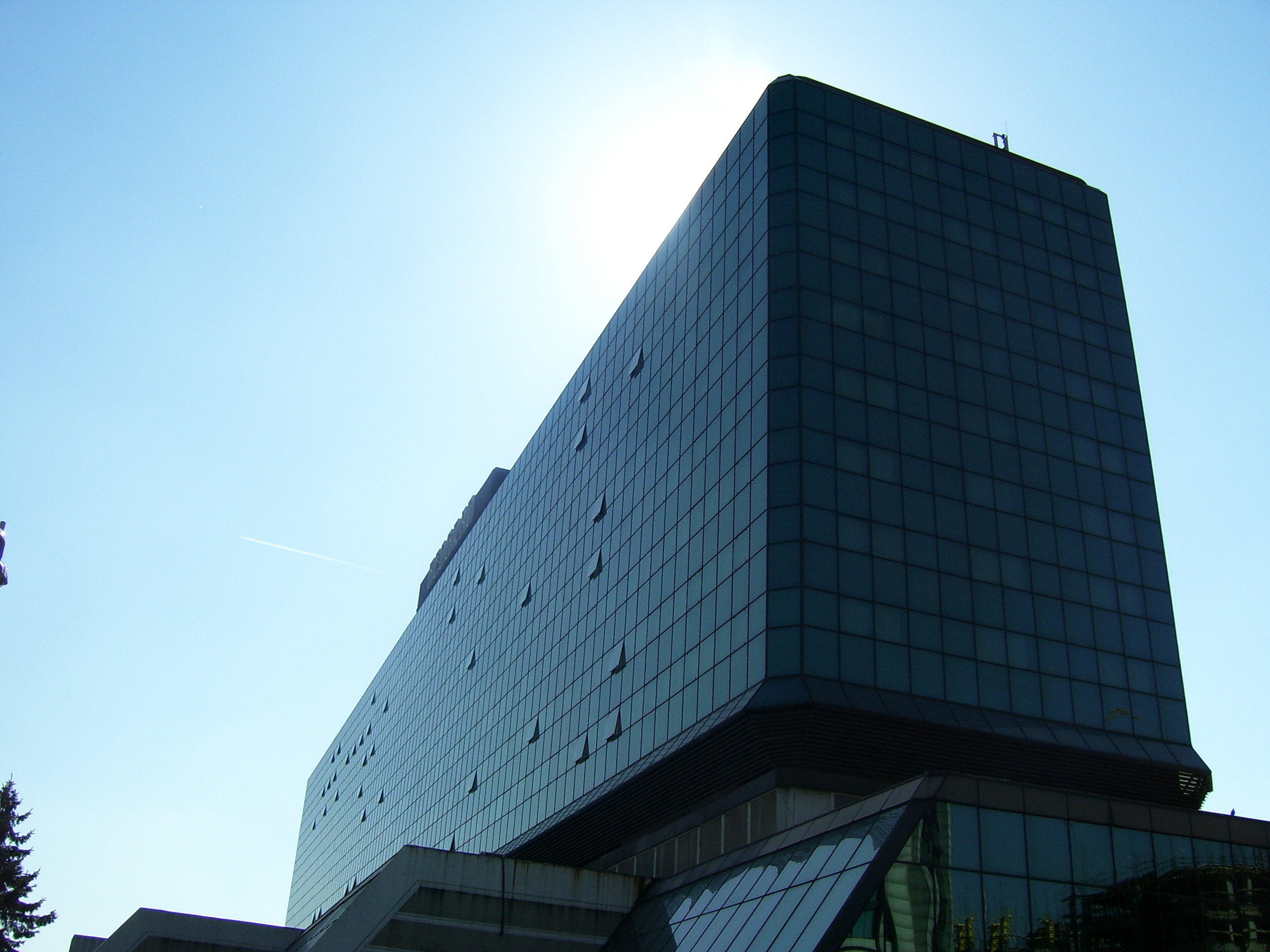
The hotel in April 2007

Built in record time from 1976 to 1978 by the Trudbenik construction firm in cooperation with 50 other subcontracting business entities, Hotel Beograd InterContinental opened in October 1979 under the InterContinental chain as a next-door companion to the simultaneously-built Sava Centar congress hall and convention center to which it is connected by a pedestrian passage (pasarela). The architect, Stojan Maksimović, with his associates, was awarded the 1977 October Prize for architecture, the highest Belgrade city administration-awarded prize at the time. Financed by the state-owned Generaleksport foreign trade company, better known as Genex, the entire construction project turned into a race against time in order to meet the deadlines imposed due to the previously scheduled International Monetary Fund (IMF) and International Bank for Reconstruction and Development (IBRD) annual fall 1979 meeting. By the time the construction phase began, franchising rights were already agreed between Genex and InterContinental, representing the famous chain's entry into the market of communist Yugoslavia as one of the first Western franchises in the country that was experiencing growing tourism from the West. At the time, the Belgrade location was InterContinental's 81st hotel worldwide. In the courtyard of this hotel there was the dandelion fountain.

In addition to foreign tourists and convention visitors, throughout the 1980s, the luxurious hotel facilities also grew popular with local politicians, celebrities, and sports figures. Known in local parlance as Interkonti, the hotel became a place to see and be seen. In December 1991, the wedding ceremony of the folk music star Lepa Brena and tennis player Slobodan Živojinović was held at the hotel.

In 1990, Beograd InterContinental received next-door competition with the luxurious Hyatt Regency Belgrade being opened in the vicinity and similarly catering to the upscale guests. Following the breakup of SFR Yugoslavia and the start of the Yugoslav Wars, sanctions were imposed onto the new state entity FR Yugoslavia, that included international economic and political isolation. As a result, the hotel became pretty much empty. Financial growth plummeted to lowest levels, however InterContinental opposed the closure and continued upgrading facilities at their hotel in Belgrade. The restaurant in the hotel became popular with the Serbian nouveau riche population. Even though the prices were high it was still popular.

During the NATO bombing of Yugoslavia in 1999, the hotel was the place where political parties led their meetings and foreign diplomats stayed.

Željko Ražnatović, a mobster and prominent paramilitary leader during the Yugoslav Wars was shot and killed in the hotel lobby in January 2000. The incident made international news and headlines.

After sanctions were dropped against Serbia, democratic power was restored, tourism started to recover and the hotel started making profits.

=== Continental Hotel Belgrade ===
On 6 July 2006 the hotel lost its InterContinental license, and in 2007 was renamed Hotel International CG and then Continental Hotel Belgrade.

Continental Hotel Belgrade had 415 rooms (112 twin bedrooms, 273 queen bedrooms, 28 suites, 2 presidential suites), including 30 apartment suites. The hotel also contained Executive and Club floors. The hotel contains eight banquet and conference rooms are on the mezzanine and represent an ideal place for organizing conventions, congresses, receptions, ceremonies, banquets and fashion shows.

Continental Hotel Belgrade also had a sports and recreation centre which includes tennis courts, gym, solarium, sauna, massage, indoor swimming pool and pool-bar. The hotel also offers the services of the Business Center, as well as restaurant services.

In 2008, Delta Holding became the hotel's new owner, purchasing it along with two smaller properties in the hotel's vicinity for a reported €150 million. The company has since signed a new management agreement with IHG, re-branding the famous hotel as a part of the "Crowne Plaza" chain. The entire investment is estimated at €35 million.

In July 2012, the hotel was closed in order to prepare for reconstruction. Work began in September 2012 and the owner identified congress and convention visitors as well as visiting sports teams and foreign tourists as its target clientele.

=== Crowne Plaza ===
In December 2013, a fully renovated hotel reopened as Crowne Plaza, an InterContinental Hotels Group brand.

The reconstruction work on the hotel building was contracted out to the Serbian construction firm Exing B&P, while the London-based Virgile and Stone was in charge of the interior design. The project management was done by Turner Southeast Europe, a subsidiary of Turner Construction.Total reconstruction cost was reportedly €30 million and the building was announced as the biggest Crown Plaza hotel in Europe. A complete renovation of the building interior and installations, spacious glass façade was replaced. The 30-year-old glass panels were replaced with a new glass facade with a significantly better energy performance. As the building is protected, a new three-layer glass panels will be exactly the same with the old ones in color and shape. As for the interior, no significant interventions were performed.

New Crowne Plaza Belgrade has 416 units (387 rooms and 29 suites), 14 conference rooms as well as a choice of restaurants and bars.

Though it had been welcoming guests since 30 December 2013, the official hotel re-opening ceremony was held on 28 January 2014. Right away, the hotel received some positive press coverage with the Sydney daily The Australian profiling it in its travel section.

The hotel has 8 floors and the floor area of 37,000 m^{2} (400,000 sq ft). It has two presidential suites, which, after the reconstruction, cover 200 m^{2} (2,200 sq ft) each. Each suite has three bedrooms, three bathrooms, kitchen, study area, etc. During the hotel's history, guests in the presidential suites included Sophia Loren and Carlo Ponti, Tina Turner, Luciano Pavarotti, Placido Domingo, Nigel Kennedy, Montserrat Caballé, Indira Gandhi, Jimmy Carter, Zubin Mehta, Sting, and Boris Becker.
