= Truworths =

South African clothing retailer

Truworths International Ltd
- Type: Public
- Traded as: JSE: TRU
- ISIN: ZAE000028296
- Industry: Clothing; Footwear
- Founded: 1917; 109 years ago
- Headquarters: Cape Town, South Africa
- Number of locations: 888 (2017)
- Area served: Southern Africa; United Kingdom; Republic of Ireland
- Key people: Michael Mark (CEO); Hilton Saven (Chairman)
- Revenue: ▲ R21 billion (2024)
- Operating income: ▲ R4.5 billion (2024)
- Number of employees: 11,698
- Subsidiaries: Office Holdings

Truworths (officially Truworths International Ltd) is a South African clothing and footwear retailer.

Founded in 1917, and based in Cape Town, Truworths operates a total of 888 stores, 763 of which are in South Africa, 88 in the United Kingdom and the Republic of Ireland, and the rest elsewhere in Southern Africa.

== History ==
In 1917, The Alliance Trading Company was established, later changing its name to Truworths Fashion House, and then Truworths Ltd in 1940.

By the 1950s, the retailer had expanded to over 80 stores. Credit accounts for customers began being offered in 1955, and sales reached R1 million in 1959.

By the late 1970s, Truworths had a total of 280 stores across South Africa.

In December 2015, Truworths acquired the UK shoe chain Office Holdings for £256 million.

== Operations ==
Truworths sells clothing and footwear in physical stores and online, and retails under a number of different brands, including Truworths, Truworths MAN, LTD, LTD Kids, Daniel Hetcher, UZZI, OFFICE London, Earth Addict, Earth Child, naartjie, Offspring, Identity, and Context.

In 2024, 54% of Truworths' revenue was generated by cash sales, with the remaining 48% coming from credit (store account) sales. In the same year, its active account holder total was 2.9 million. Also in 2024, 82% of Truworths sales were from physical stores, while 18% were from online purchases.
