= Miroslav Mišković =

Serbian oligarch, business magnate, investor

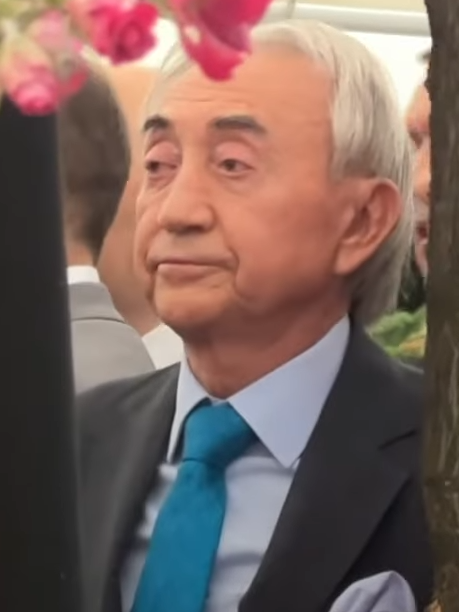
- Mišković in 2023
- Born: 5 July 1945 (age 81); Bošnjane, FS Serbia, DF Yugoslavia
- Education: University of Belgrade
- Occupation: President of Delta Holding
- Spouse: Ljiljana Mišković
- Children: 2
- Website: miroslavmiskovic.rs

Miroslav Mišković (Serbian Cyrillic: Мирослав Мишковић; born 5 July 1945) is a Serbian oligarch, business magnate, investor and owner of Delta Holding.

According to Nedeljnik, as of December 2024, Mišković's estimated net worth stood at €3.85 billion, making him the richest individual in Serbia. Mišković holds 22nd place on this list, but is fifth among the tycoons outside the former Soviet Union. According to the Forbes list of billionaires of 2017. In the 2017 list of the richest people in the world published annually by Forbes magazine, Mišković is the world's 691st richest person, with a net worth of $4.9 billion.

== Early life ==
Mišković was born in 1945 in the small village of Bošnjane, Central Serbia. He was raised and lived on his family's farm. At age eight, Mišković was almost blinded in his left eye when a playmate accidentally struck him with a rock while playing with a slingshot, losing 90% of his vision. Mišković completed his high school education in the nearby city of Kruševac and graduated from the University of Belgrade's Faculty of Economics branch in Kragujevac in 1971, majoring in finance and economics. Afterwards, he worked at Jugobanka and Trayal until 1977, when he found work at Župa Chemical Industries (ZCI).

== Business career ==
Mišković became financial director of ZCI in 1984, and chief executive in 1987 until 1990, when he briefly served as deputy prime minister in the government of Serbia for only six months in office. Meanwhile, Mišković founded Delta M (Delta M being a sort of abbreviation of his initials - double M) in 1991, a company that became very successful in the following years, during the Yugoslav wars and under the regime of Slobodan Milošević. Soon afterwards, he launched Delta banka (sold to Banca Intesa in 2005), that was to become the first part of Mišković's extremely successful Delta Holding corporation that is involved in agribusiness, retail sales, distribution, financial brokerage, real estate development and insurance.

Mišković's connection to Slobodan Milošević was never obvious, except for his short stint as deputy prime minister in 1990. After the overthrow of Milošević's regime, Mišković was linked to Dušan Mihajlović, the minister of police at the time, and the other leaders of the Democratic Opposition of Serbia coalition.

After 5 October 2000, Mišković took an advantage of privatisation and started building his empire. As he has managed to purchase most of large companies post Djindjic murder, it is often argued that Mišković was 'buying Serbia' with money that was taken out to Cyprus during Milosevic reign.

Mišković was abducted on 9 April 2001, but was released the next day, when the ransom (estimated at 7 million Deutsche Mark's) was paid 18 hours later. After the assassination of Serbian Prime Minister Zoran Đinđić on 12 March 2003, the abduction of Mišković was attributed to the same group that has been convicted of the death of the prime minister and other similar crimes. He was owner of Maxi and Delta stores, but sold them to Belgian Delhaize for 1 billion euros.

== Criminal investigation ==
On 12 December 2012, Mišković was detained along with his son Marko and eight others in connection with the privatization of several public road maintenance companies in 2005 during which the suspects allegedly “gained illegal profit” of about €30 million ($38.98 million). Mišković and Milo Đurašković, who was also arrested, were “co-owners in privatized road companies between 2005 and 2010” and they “usurped money and property of those companies worth about 2.87 billion dinars at the time,” Serbian Special Prosecutor for Organized Crime said in a televised statement, adding that the partnership between the two began in 2005 when Mišković's Cyprus-based company Hemslade Trading Ltd. purchased a road maintenance company based in Belgrade for €23 million.

Mišković was released from custody on 22 July 2013, after posting a €12 million bail. In March 2016 he was acquitted by the Belgrade High Court of the abuse of office charges but found guilty of aiding and abetting in tax evasion. On appeal the Appellate Court in Belgrade upheld the ruling of the first-instance court, acquitting Mišković of the abuse of office charges, but referred the case back to the first-instance court for retrial in regard to the tax evasion charges.

== See also ==
- List of kidnappings
