= Office Holdings =

- Company type: Private
- Industry: Retail
- Predecessor: Office London (1981)
- Founded: October 25, 1983; 42 years ago
- Headquarters: London, United Kingdom
- Number of locations: 86 (2025)
- Area served: United Kingdom and Ireland
- Products: Footwear
- Revenue: ▲£294 million (2024)
- Net income: ▲£39 million (2024)
- Number of employees: 1,824 (2024)
- Parent: Truworths
- Website: www.office.co.uk

Office Holdings is a fashion retailer owned by the South African company, Truworths. It operates the "Office" chain of footwear standalone stores in the UK & Ireland. Office Holdings also owns Offspring; a casual shoe and trainer retailer in the UK.

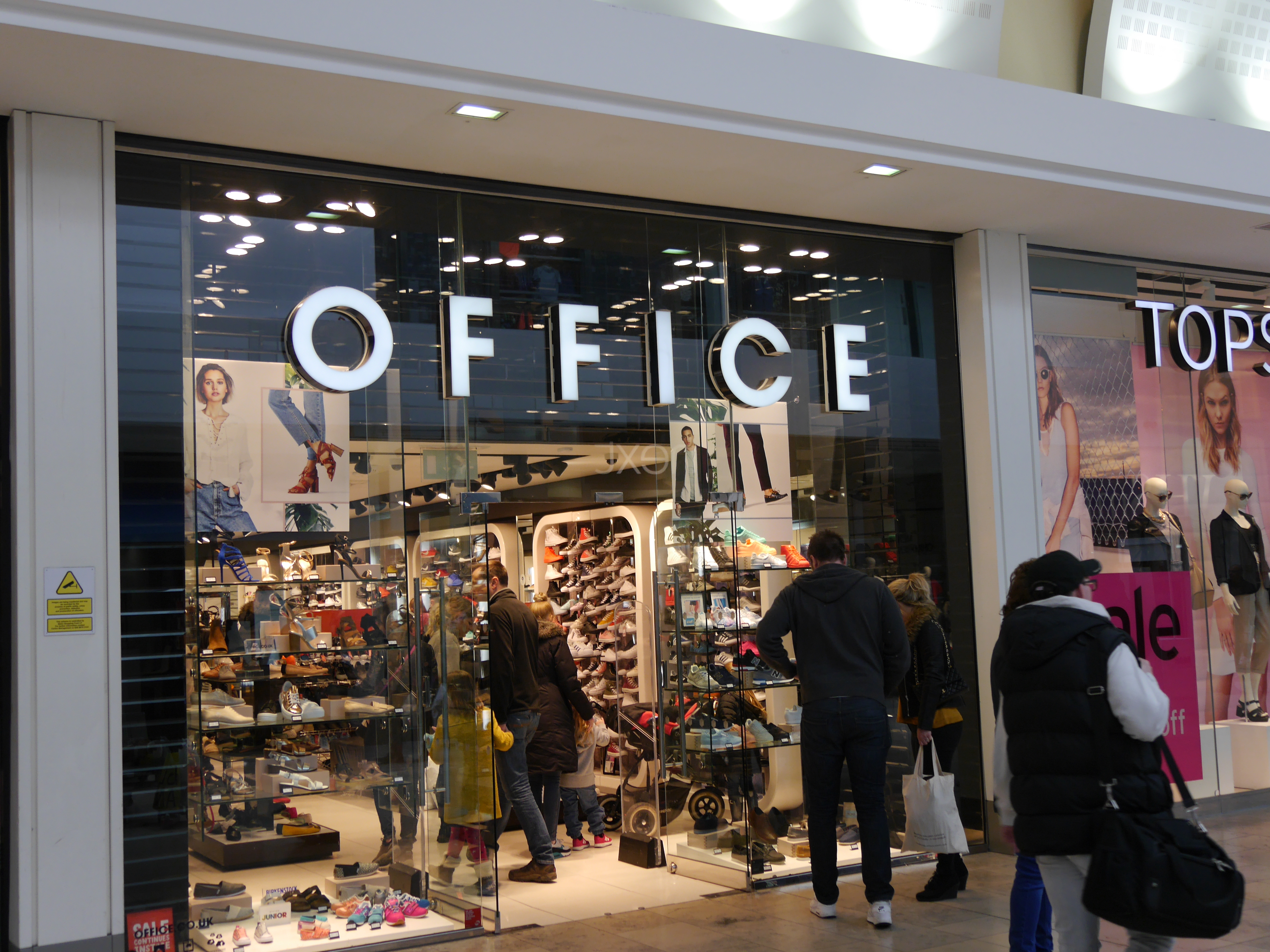
An Office store in the Southside Wandsworth shopping centre in London

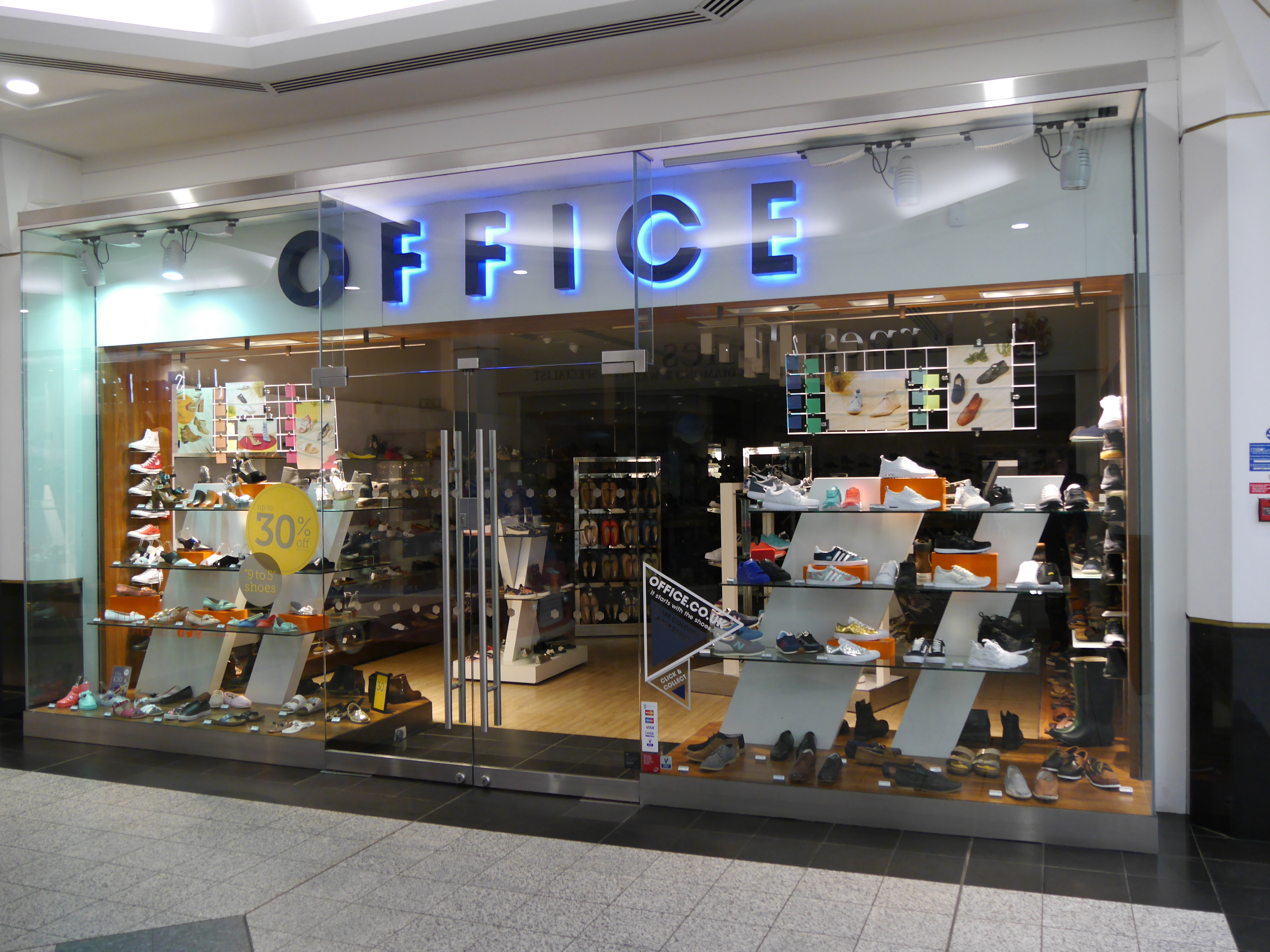
An Office store in the Putney Exchange shopping centre in London

== History ==
The company's first store opened in 1981 under the name "Office London" with a concession inside the "Hyper Hyper" store on Kensington High Street. The name came from the fact that their merchandise was originally displayed on old office furniture. The first standalone Office store opened on Kings Road, London in 1984. By 2014, the company had 105 standalone stores across the UK and circa 50 concessions.

In 1996 Office launched the Offspring brand, a fashion sports footwear concept. Poste, an upmarket men's boutique, was launched in 2000; it is styled after a typical gentleman's club. This was followed by Poste Mistress in 2001, a ladies' footwear boutique selling labels such as Vivienne Westwood and Dries van Noten.

In 2015 Office was warned by the Information Commissioner's Office to improve its data security practices, after the personal details of more than a million customers, including passwords, were found to be stored in an insecure, unencrypted database outside of the company's core systems. Remedial measures included enforcing a revised data retention policy to ensure that data is only kept as long as necessary.

The company has changed hands a number of times. Initially, it was purchased by Tom Hunter of the West Coast Capital Group, whose portfolio at the time included high street shops Qube and USC and hotel chain Travelodge. West Coast subsequently sold the business to Silverfleet Capital in 2010.

In December 2015, South African clothing retailer Truworths acquired Office Holdings for £256 million (R5.5bn).
