= Mexx =

Dutch fashion brand

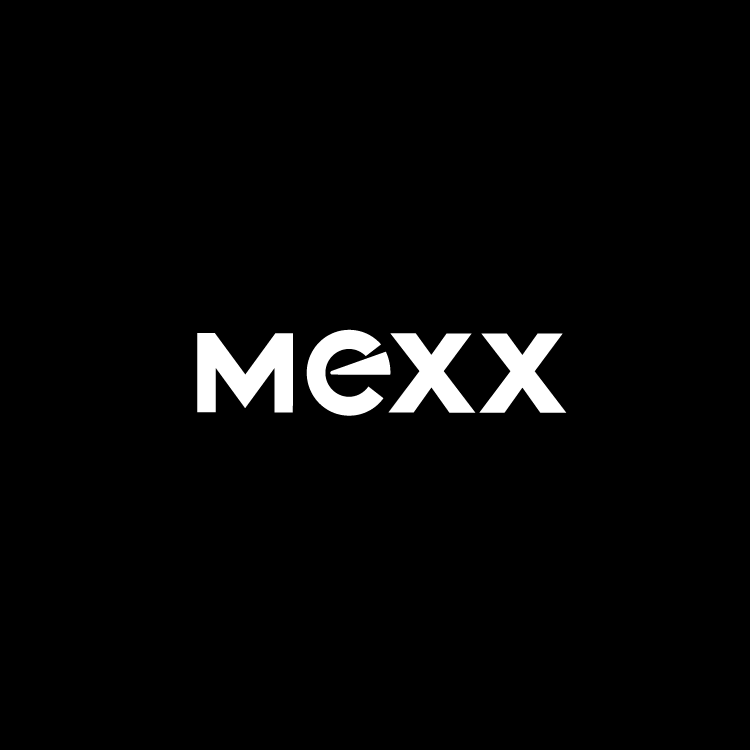
Logo

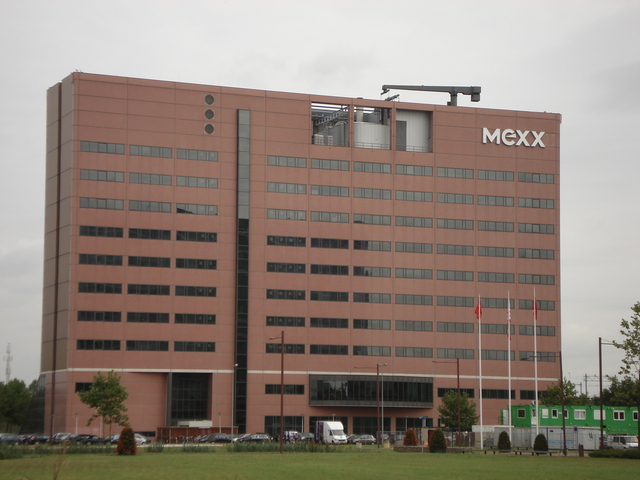
Mexx office in Amsterdam

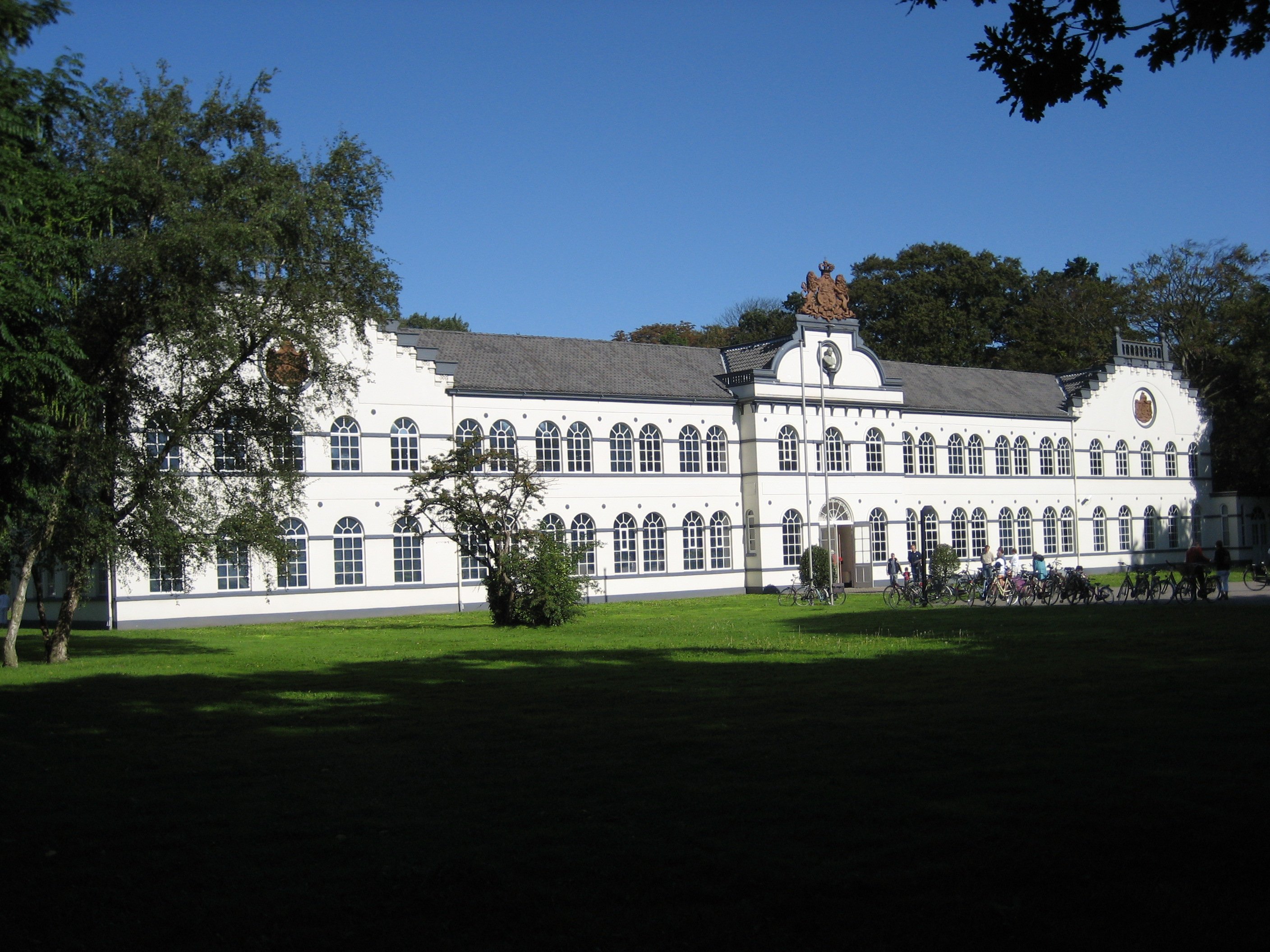
Mexx office in Voorschoten, 1985-2008

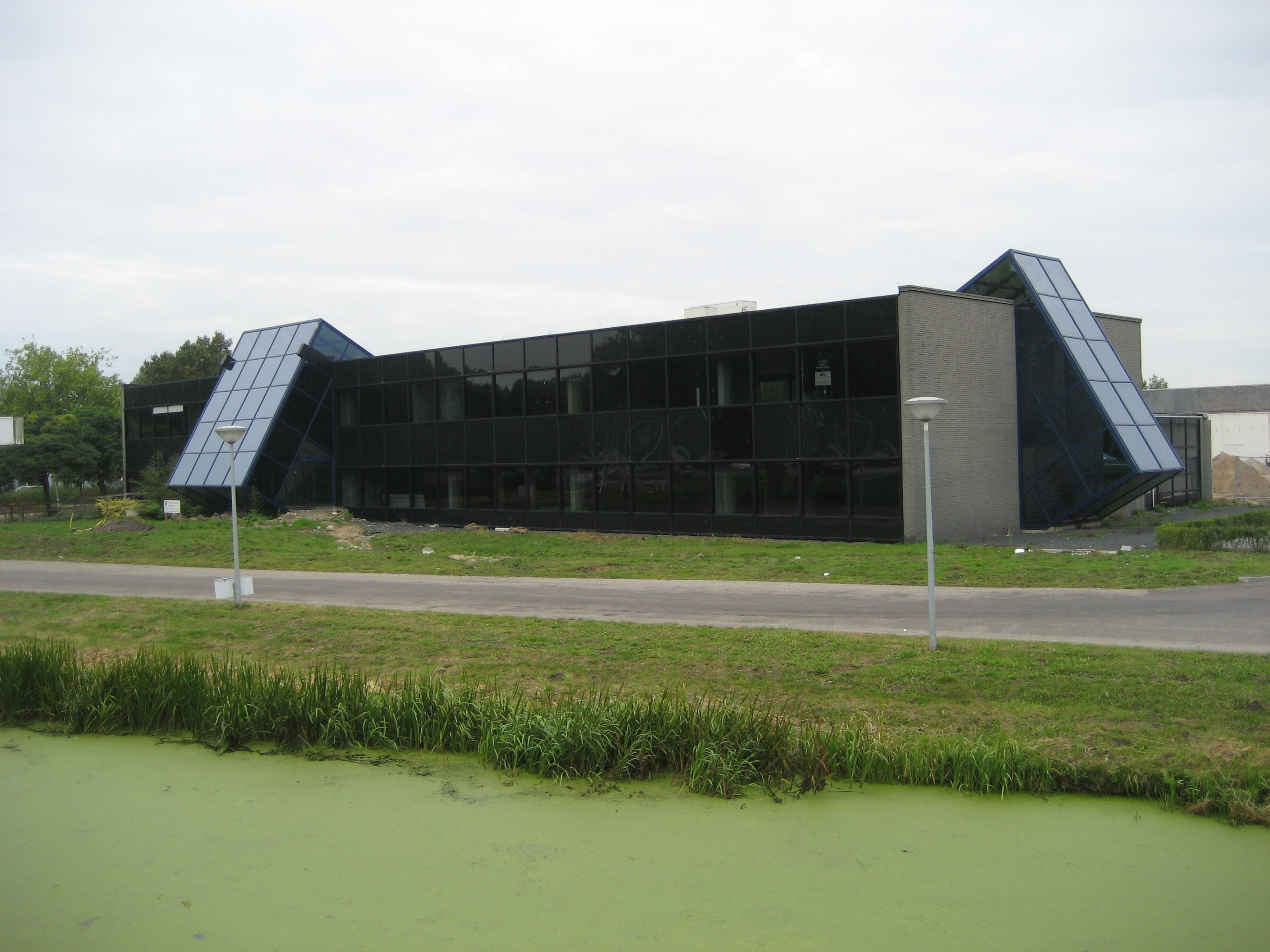
Mexx office in Leiden, 1988-1992

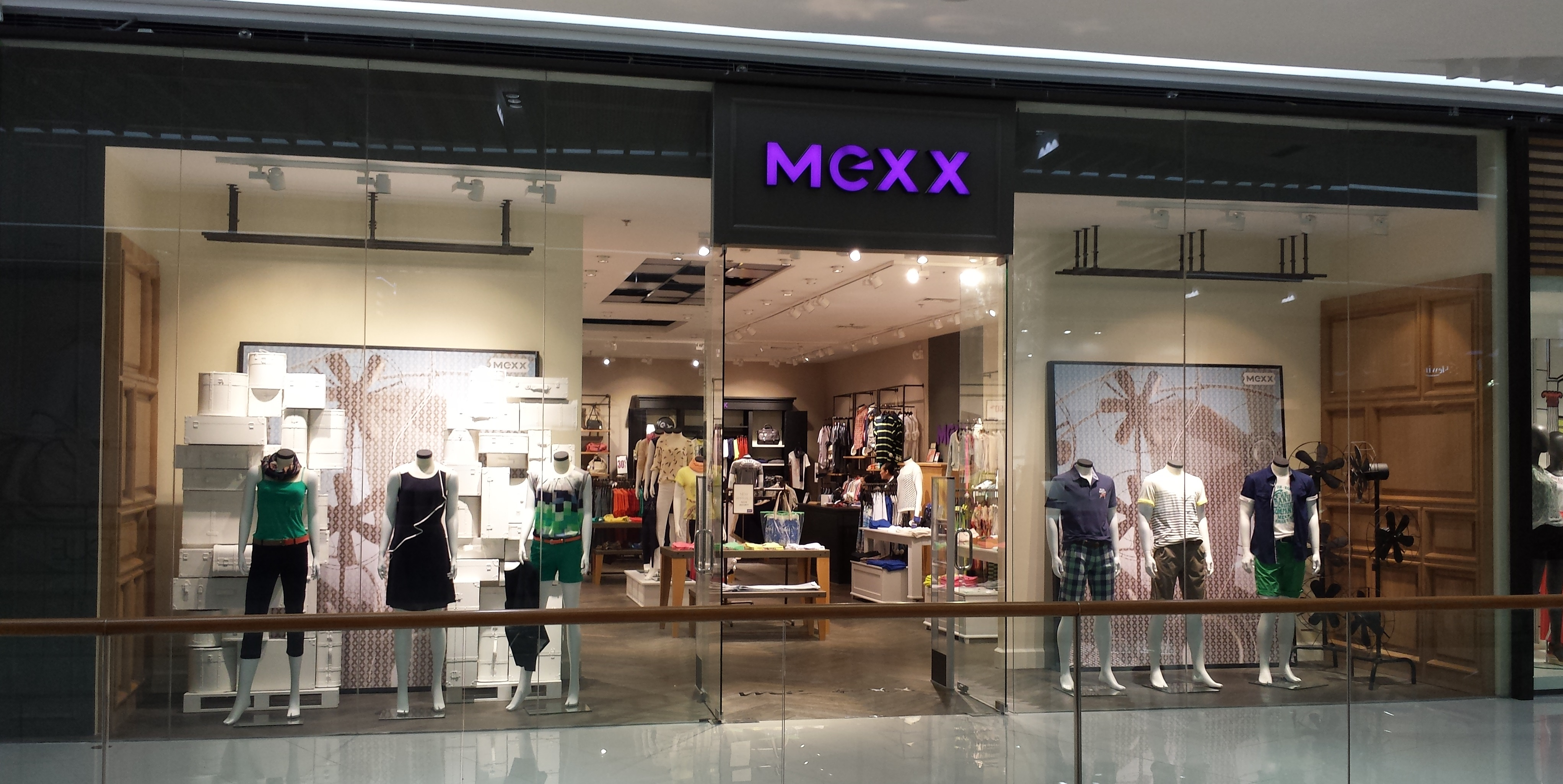
SM Aura Premier mall in Bonifacio Global City, Metro Manila, Philippines

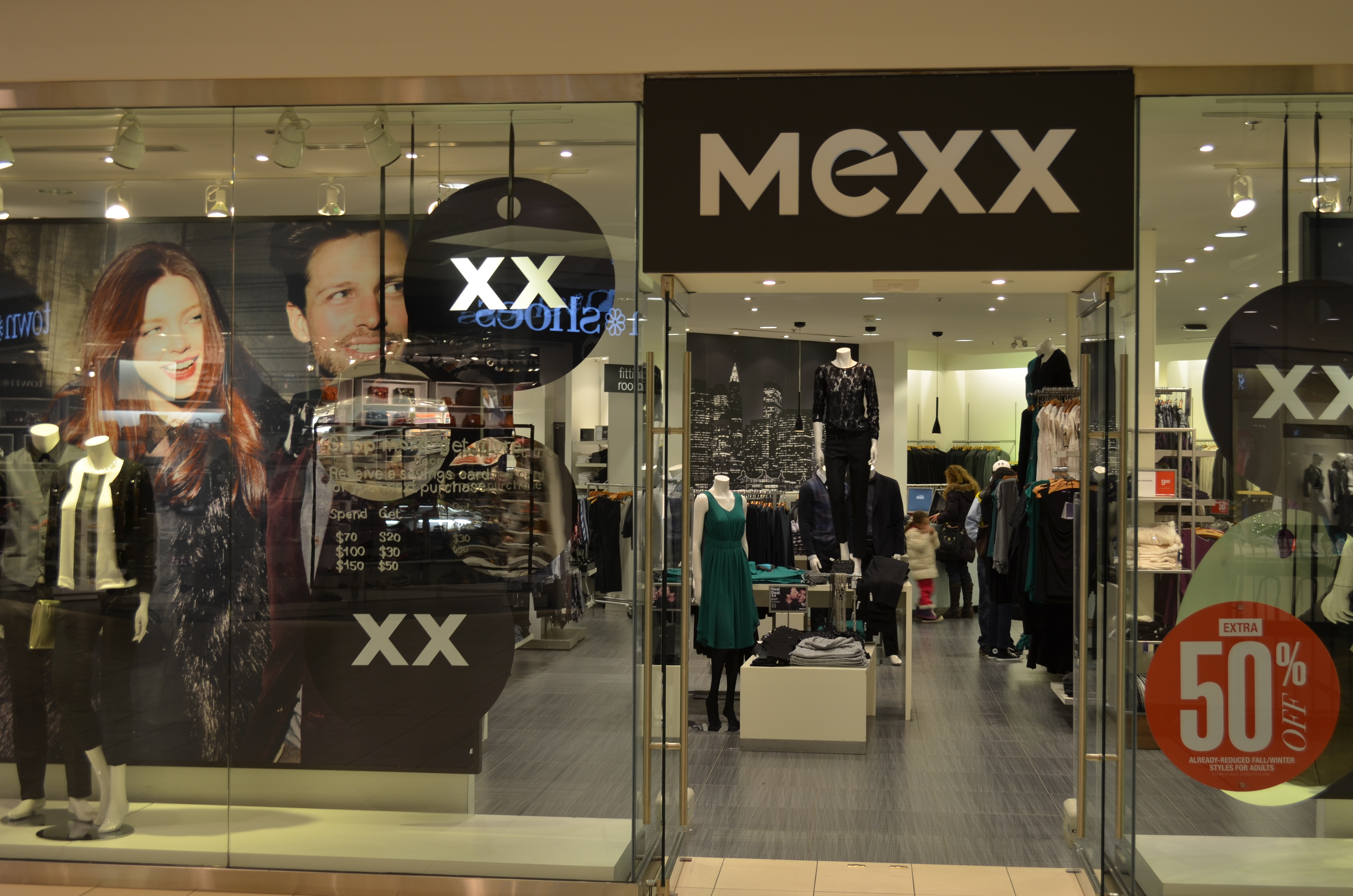
Promenade mall in Vaughan, Ontario, Canada

Mexx is a fashion brand of HVEG Fashion Group, created in the Netherlands by Rattan Chadha in 1986 by merging his brands Moustache (for men) and Emmanuelle (for women). The brand's name is a combination of two of Chadha's previous business ventures, a men's line "Moustache" and a women's line "Emanuelle" It takes the first letter of both brands and adds two kisses to it: Mexx. M (oustache) + E (manuelle) + XX (two kisses) = MEXX. The advertising campaign "Everything should be XX" from 1986 caught on attention and Mexx became popular.

Mexx has grown into an international brand in women's, men's and children's clothing with stores in more than 50 countries. With a production of 40 million pieces, Mexx was one of the top thirty largest brands in Europe in 2010. Since the second quarter of 2008, however, Mexx has been facing declining sales and has had to close the stores. In 2001, Mexx was bought by the American Liz Claiborne (LCI), which sold it in the autumn of 2011 to a joint venture with the Gores Group.

From 1985 to 2008, the company was located in Voorschoten, in the former silver factory of Koninklijke Van Kempen & Begeer. After that, the head office was located in the former European head office of Nissan in the Amsterdam Riekerpolder.

On December 4, 2014, three holding companies of the group were declared bankrupt by the Amsterdam District Court. In February 2015, Mexx made a restart after the Turkish clothing and retail company Eroğlu Holding, who founded the Colin's brand, well known in Turkey, Russia, Ukraine and Central Asia, bought Mexx. Among the aims behind the purchase was the intended use of Mexx's established European brand recognition to give Eroğlu Holdings access to new European markets and points of sale.

Two years later, in 2017, the company came back into Dutch hands, the Brabant-based RNF Holding. The Mexx shoe collection was relaunched in 2018. The spring / summer collection of 2021 is the first collection for Mexx fashion to be designed from the office of Mexx in Drunen. A relaunch campaign started with the quote "Everything should be XX".

Several years after leaving the Canadian market, Mexx returned to Canada under a distribution deal with Walmart Canada. The collection consists of shoes, clothing, and home accents.

On 1 October 2024 it was announced that Mexx would be sold by NFG Group to HVEG Fashion Group. This company already owns some Dutch and German fashion brands, like Bamboo Basics and Twinlife.

In December 2024, it was announced that HVEG had completed the purchase of RNF Group, the company that had managed the brand until then.
