= Delta Holding =

Serbian holding company

- Native name: Делта Холдинг
- Company type: d.o.o.
- Industry: Holding
- Founded: 10 January 1997; 29 years ago (Current form); 4 February 1991; 35 years ago (Founded)
- Headquarters: Vladimira Popovića 6, Belgrade, Serbia
- Area served: Serbia; Montenegro; North Macedonia; Bosnia and Herzegovina; Bulgaria; Russia
- Key people: Milka Vojvodić (CEO); Miroslav Mišković (President)
- Products: See divisions
- Revenue: ▲€924.91 million (2019)
- Net income: ▲€178.9 million (2019)
- Total assets: ▲€2.361 billion (2019)
- Total equity: ▲€1.074 billion (2019)
- Owner: Delta Investment (77.72%); Hemslade Trading Limited (12.07%); Others
- Number of employees: 3,578 (2019)
- Subsidiaries: Delta Agrar Group; Delta Food Processing; Delta Real Estate Group; Delta Distribution; Delta Foundation
- Website: www.deltaholding.rs
- Footnotes / references Business ID: 17156730; Tax ID: 101681615

Delta Holding is a Serbian holding company with the headquarters in Belgrade. It has interests in a variety of industries, such as agribusiness, real estate and wholesale. It employs around 3,600 people, making it one of the largest non-government employers in Serbia. The founder and president of Delta Holding is Miroslav Mišković.

== History ==
Delta Holding was founded on 4 February 1991 in Belgrade.

In March 2011, Delta Holding sold its largest subsidiary and biggest Serbian supermarket chain Maxi, to the Belgian Delhaize Group for 932.5 million euros. In May 2014, Assicurazioni Generali bought the remaining shares of the second-largest Serbian insurance company "Delta Generali".

In February 2016, Delta City shopping malls in Belgrade and Podgorica were sold to the South African Hyprop Investments Ltd for 202.5 million euros. As of 31 December 2017, Delta Holding has 55 subsidiary companies (divided in four divisions), of which 17 are headquartered outside Serbia.

In March 2019, Delta Holding opened shopping malls in Banja Luka and Varna, in which 190 million euros were invested. In April 2019, Delta Holding's subsidiary company "Autokomanda" bought for 4.2 million euros a location for future shopping mall in Autokomanda neighborhood.

== Divisions ==
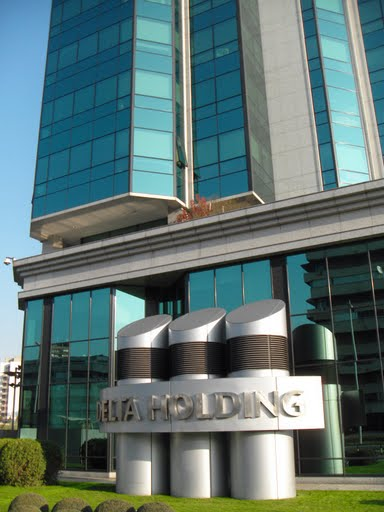
Delta Holding headquarters in Novi Beograd

Delta Holding has 55 companies within its holding and a total of four divisions (and foundation), each one serving a different purpose. The divisions are as follows:

- Delta Agrar Group - Agribusiness - the largest division of Delta Holding. This division operates in the agribusiness activities include agricultural production, processing, distribution and marketing. As of January 2016, Delta Agrar manages around 14,500 hectares of agriculture land (around 145 square kilometers) in Serbia.
- Delta Food Processing
  - Danubius Novi Sad
  - Yuhor Jagodina
  - Gala Mioni Mionica
  - Fun&Fit Zemun
- Delta Real Estate Group - Real estate
  - Delta Real Estate
  - Shopping Malls
  - Hotels and offices - Crowne Plaza Belgrade, Park Hotel, Belexpocentar, HolidayInn
- Delta Distribution - Wholesale
  - Delta DMD
  - Delta Transport Systems (DTS)
  - Delta Automoto
  - Delta Motors
- Delta Foundation
