= Eroğlu Holding =

Turkish clothing retailer

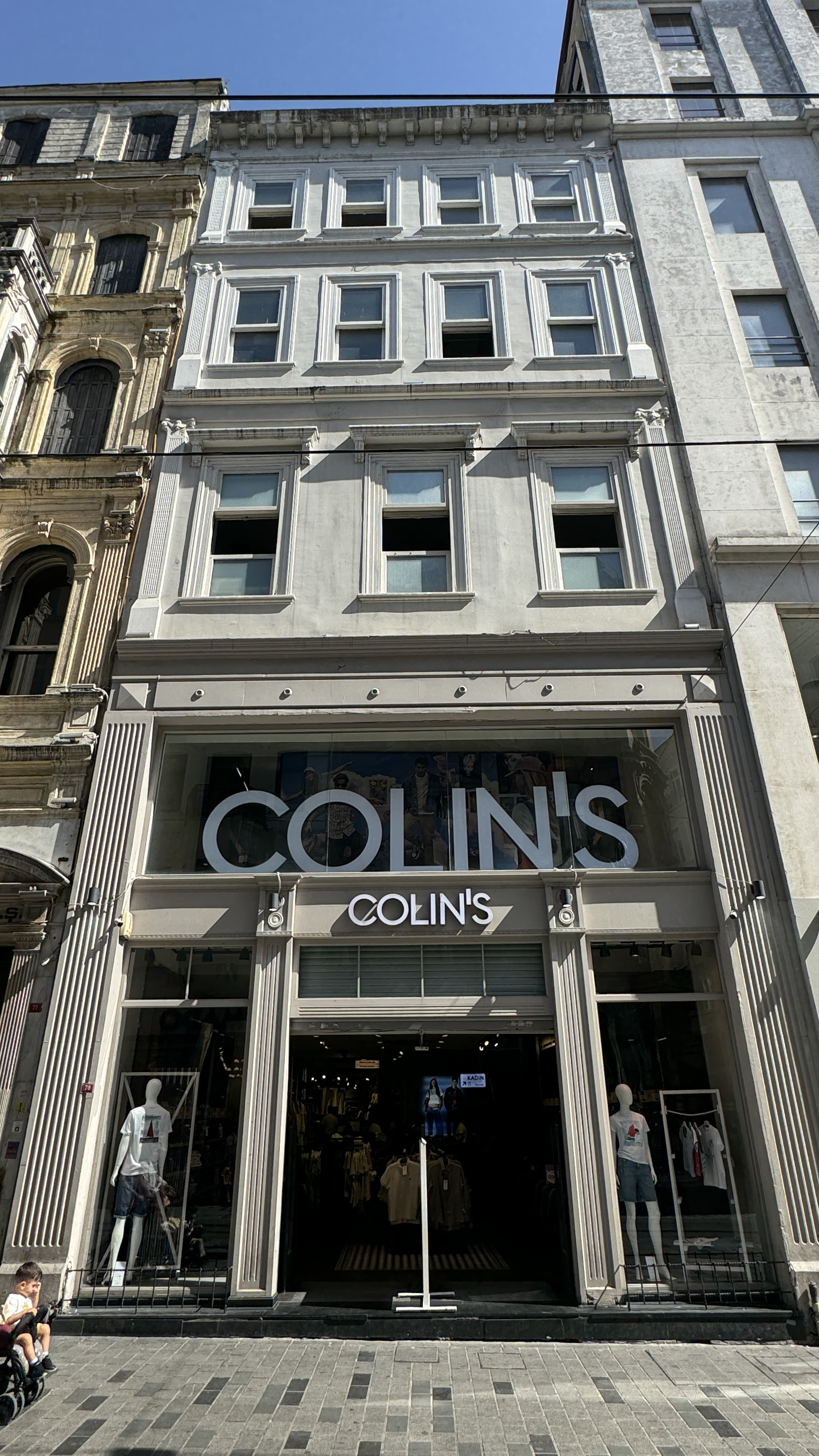
Colin's store on historic İstiklal Cadessi, Istanbul

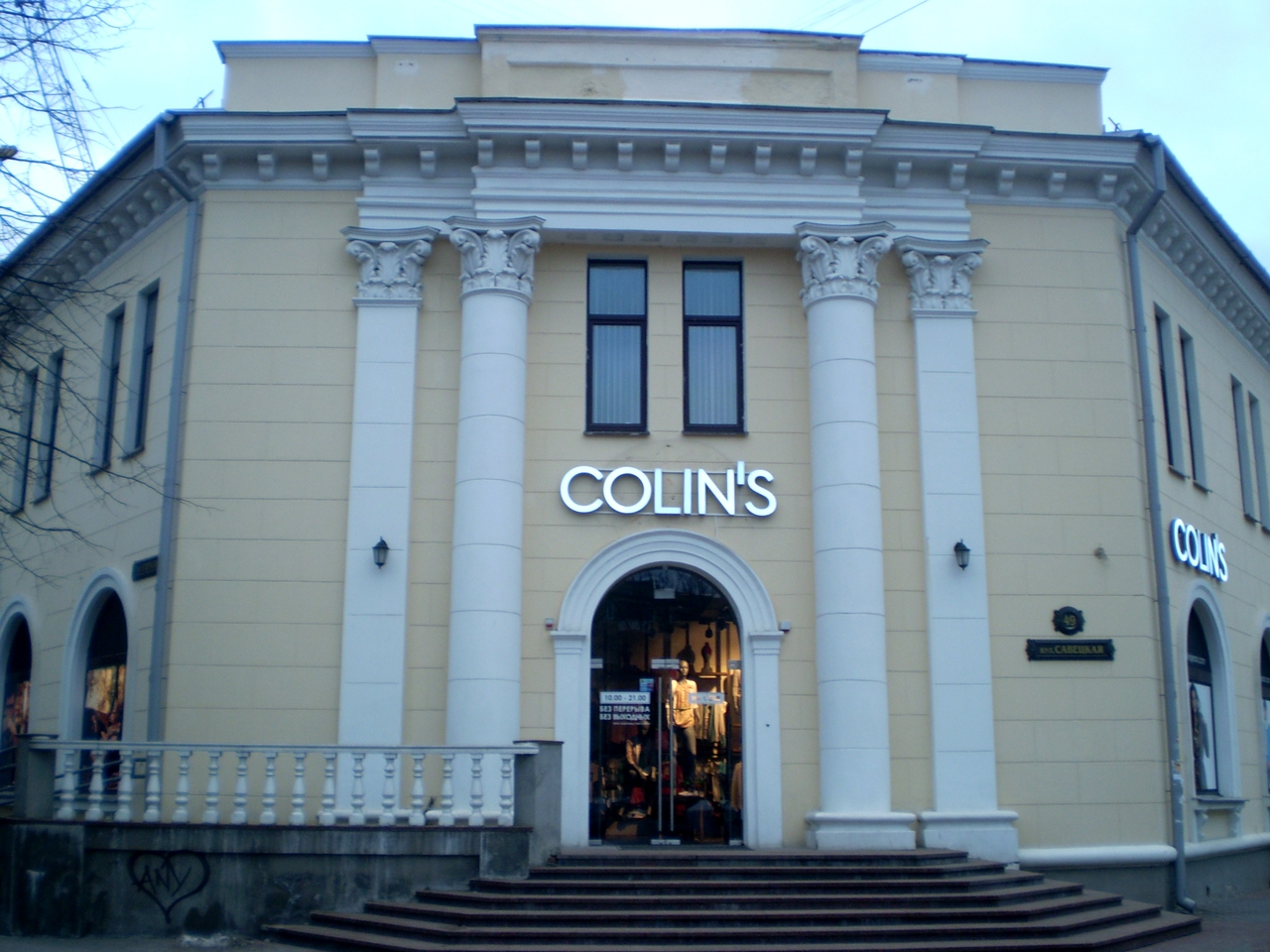
Colin's store in Brest, Belarus

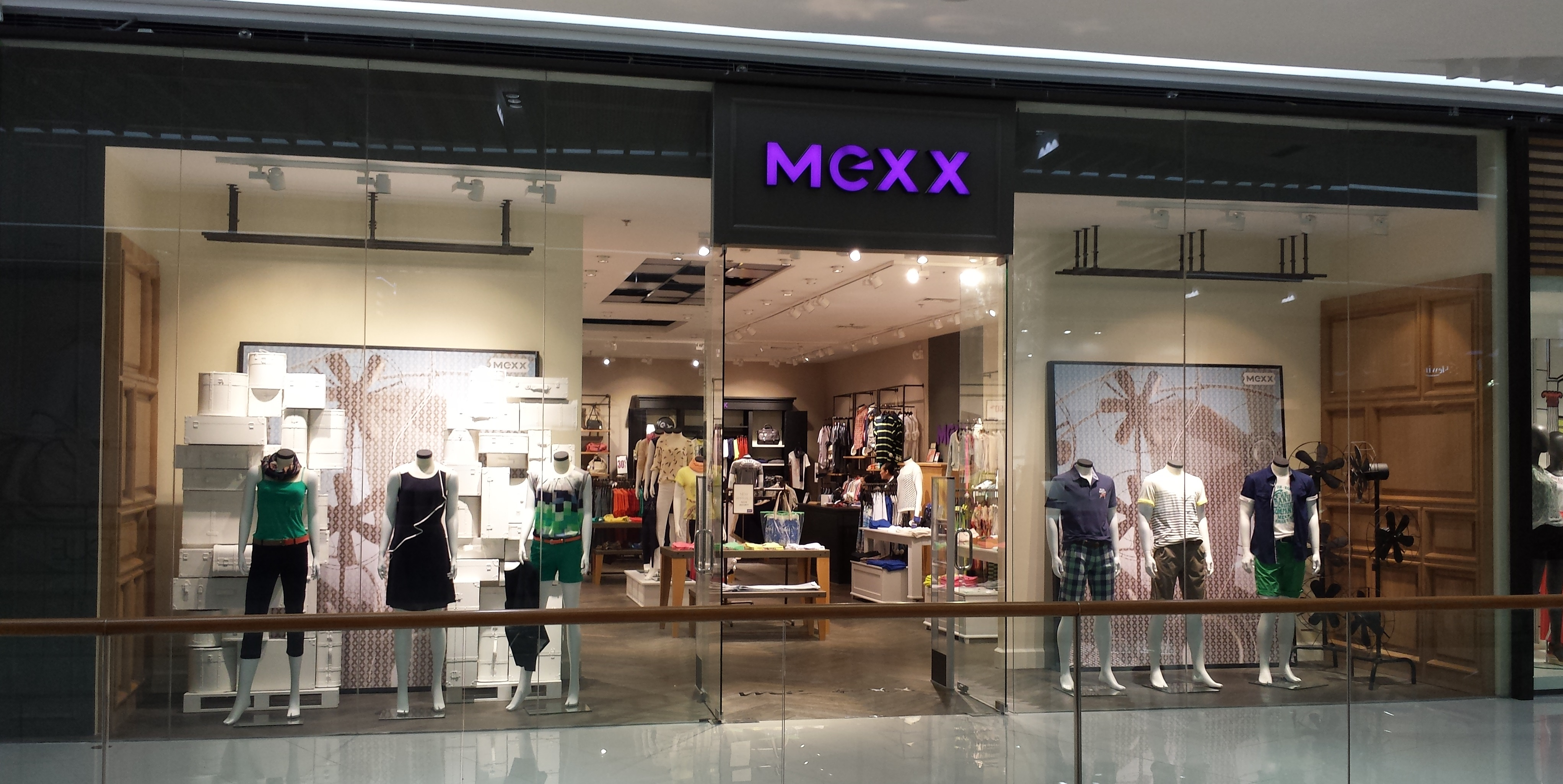
MEXX shop at SM Aura Premier mall in Bonifacio Global City, Metro Manila, Philippines

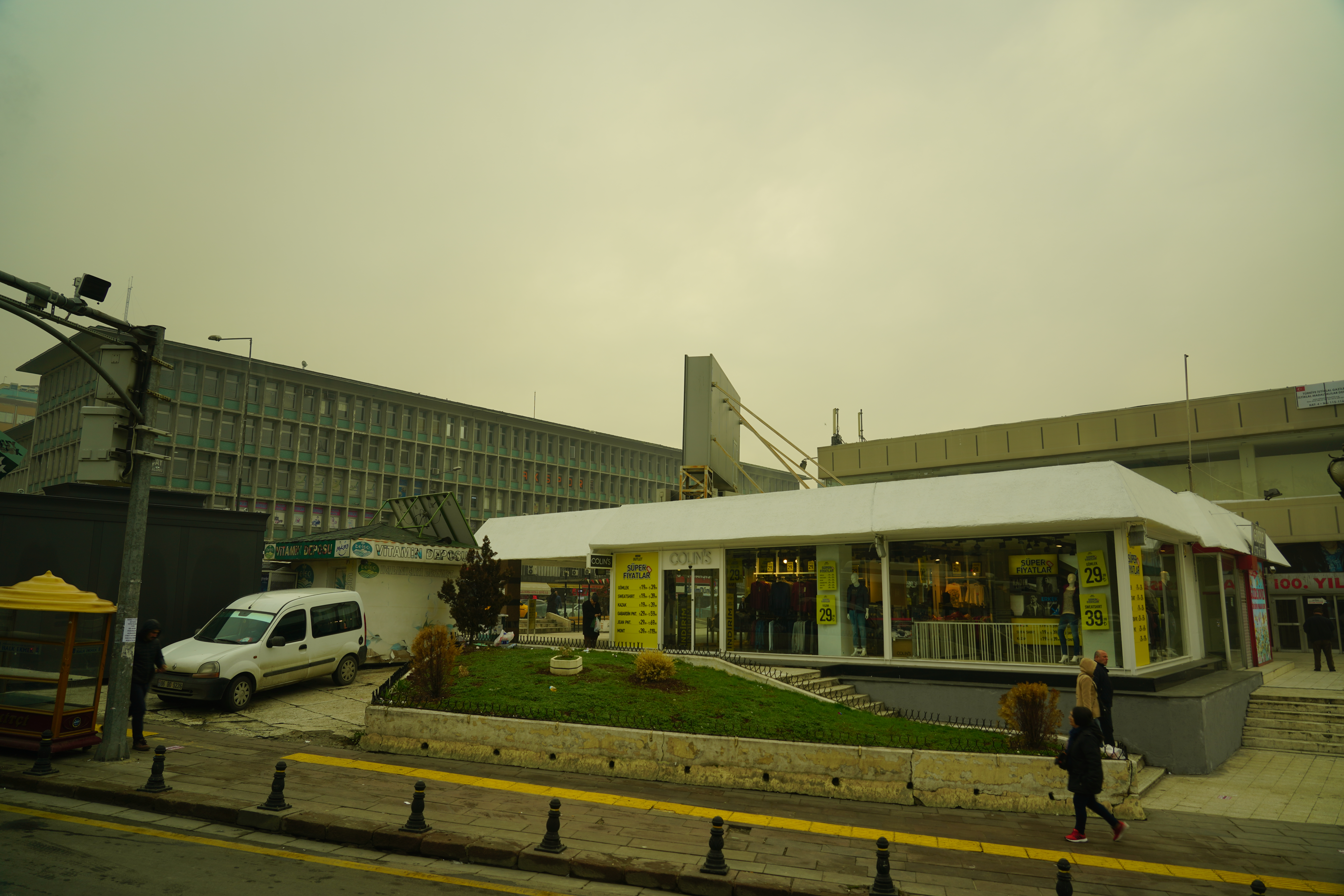
A Colin's store in Cumhuriyet street, Ankara, Turkey

Eroğlu Holding (Turkish: Eroğlu Giyim) is a company based in Avcılar, Istanbul, Turkey that manufactures and retails clothing. Between 2015–2017, it owned the brand Mexx, with about 300 stores and about 5000 total sales points in 56 countries at the time, based in Amsterdam, Netherlands.

Eroğlu Holding also founded the brands COLIN'S and LOFT. COLIN'S has over 600 stores in 24 countries. LOFT has 82 stores.

The company's origins date back to the year 1983, when Nurettin Eroğlu and his four brothers set up a 150-m^{2} clothing factory, which started producing coats and down jackets. In 1986, they started manufacturing their first jeans, branded "Kulis". In 1992, they opened a 10,000m^{2} factory in Avcılar, Istanbul. By 1992, production was at 1,500 pairs per day and that same year, they renamed their brand "Colin's Jeans".

By 2015 the Holding had sales of over 1.5 billion USD per year, with 70% coming from outside of Turkey. Russia was its biggest market.

== Colin's ==
As of 2024, Colin's has over 600 stores in 24 countries. As of 2017, 200 stores were located in Russia.

In 1993, Colin's began to export.

In 2012, Colin's announced its expansion into China. Colin's is one of the best-known clothing brands in Russia, Ukraine and Belarus, with about 11 million Ukrainians visiting 65 Colin's stores there during 2017. Amid the ongoing conflict arising from the Russian invasion of Ukraine, Colin's has continued its online sales operations within Russia.

== Mexx ==
After declaring bankruptcy on December 4, 2014, Dutch fashion brand Mexx was acquired by Eroğlu Holding in February 2015. Among the aims behind the purchase was the intended use of Mexx's established European brand recognition to give Eroğlu Holdings access to new European markets and points of sale. However, in 2017, Mexx bought from Eroğlu Holdings by the Dutch brand group, RNF Holding.

== Manufacturing ==
In addition to the earlier factories, in 1998 Eroğlu Holding opened a new 35,000m^{2} facility in Esenyurt, Istanbul, and in 2003 a 45,000m^{2} factory in Çorlu, and in 2004 a smaller 10,000m^{2} factory in the founder's hometown of Aksaray. The Holding thus now manufactures in Istanbul and Aksaray in Turkey, and in 2024, Eroğlu invested $40 million in a 62,000m^{2} jeans factory in Egypt's Suez Canal Economic Zone (SCZone), to employ 2,750 workers.

By 2017, 25% of Colin's brand merchandise was produced in China, 30% in Bangladesh, 10% in Egypt, and the rest in Turkey.

By 2024 the Group had a production capacity of 20 million units per year.
