= Ilija Paranos =

Serbian jurist, police officer, football referee

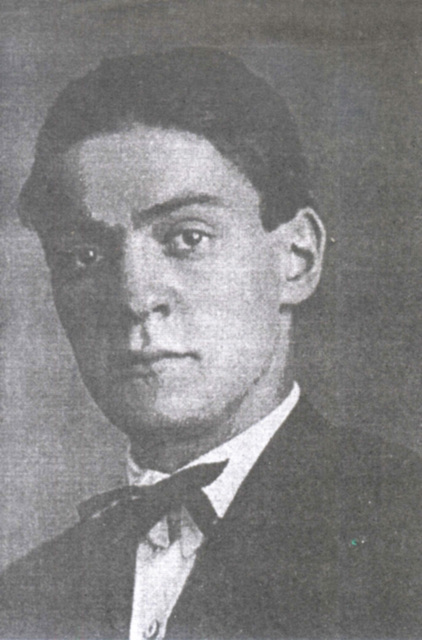

Personal details
- Born: 1902 Šabac,Kingdom of Serbia
- Died: 1945 (aged 42–43) Trieste,Kingdom of Italy
- Education: University of Belgrade Faculty of Law
- Nickname: Milka

Military service
- Branch/service: Belgrade Special Police
- Battles/wars: World War II

Ilija Paranos (1902–1945) was a Serbian and Yugoslav jurist, police officer, and football referee. During the German occupation of Serbia in World War II, he served as the head of the Belgrade Special Police.

== Early life ==
Ilija Paranos hailed from a Herzegovinian family. His great-grandfather, Risto Paranos, originally from Staro Slano near Trebinje, first moved to Sarajevo, then to Dubrovnik, where he partnered with the Krsmanović brothers to establish a trading business. He later relocated to Šamac, Brčko, and finally Belgrade. Risto Paranos developed a thriving plum trade, conducting business in Serbia, Austria-Hungary, Italy, and even the United States, eventually becoming one of the wealthiest Serbs of his time. Thanks to his trade connections, Risto's son, Rista R. Paranos, was able in 1879 to propose and secure the appointment of his business partner, Gerhard Jensen, as the first honorary consul of the Kingdom of Serbia in the United States.

== Education and interwar career ==
Ilija Paranos was born in 1902 in Šabac to Kosta Paranos. He completed his studies at the Faculty of Law at the University of Belgrade and began his career as a clerk for the Belgrade City Administration. Quickly advancing through the ranks, he became one of the most prominent police officers of his time. In the early 1930s, he became a pilot and commissioner of the Belgrade Airfield (located in Zemun).

He further advanced to the position of Chief of the Central Registry Office of the Belgrade City Administration. This role often placed him alongside Prince Paul Karađorđević and Prime Minister Milan Stojadinović during their foreign trips. During Stojadinović's 1936 visit to Hermann Göring, Paranos had the opportunity to acquaint himself with Gestapo officers, a connection that would later play a significant role in how he was perceived during the impending war.

In interwar Belgrade, Paranos was also active in sports organizations and served as a football referee. It was through this engagement that he met Milutin Ivković—nicknamed Milutinac—a footballer for SK Jugoslavija and FK BASK, a dermatologist, and a supporter of the Communist Party.

== Head of the Special Police of the Belgrade City Administration ==
Following the German occupation of Serbia in 1941, Ilija Paranos signed the Appeal to the Serbian People. In July 1941, he led an operation to destroy the Kolubara Partisan Detachment.

In September 1941, after the formation of Milan Nedić's Government of National Salvation, Paranos was appointed head of the Belgrade Special Police. The primary task of the Special Police was to conduct anti-communist operations against the Partisan movement and to assist the German occupying authorities in suppressing the Yugoslav Army in the Homeland.

On November 9, 1941, Colonel Jovan Trišić, acting commander of the gendarmerie, was arrested by the Special Police for aiding Draža Mihailović. Paranos personally interrogated Trišić.

Paranos's prewar friend, Milutin Ivković—known as Milutinac—was arrested multiple times by the Gestapo due to his connections with the Partisans. According to some accounts, Paranos repeatedly intervened to save him, urging Ivković to leave the country and serve as a doctor in a prisoner-of-war camp housing Yugoslav officers captured during the April War. Paranos also managed to save Friedrich and Ruža Pops, Ivković's Jewish in-laws, despite their arrests by the Gestapo. They survived the war.

However, Ivković was ultimately arrested on May 24, 1943, by the Gestapo. He was imprisoned at the Banjica concentration camp and executed the following morning at the Jajinci execution site. It is believed that Ivković's rapid arrest and execution, which occurred unusually quickly, was a personal vendetta by Svetozar Toza Vujković, the camp's administrator. Vujković, a former head of the Fourth Anti-Communist Section of the Special Police, had hoped to become the wartime head of the Special Police but was passed over in favor of Paranos.

Toward the end of the war, Paranos established contact with General Dragoljub Mihailović, Chief of Staff of the Supreme Command of the Yugoslav Army in the Homeland, attempting to negotiate some form of cooperation. This collaboration was staunchly opposed by Major Aleksandar Mihailović Vili, commander of the Belgrade Corps group of the Yugoslav Army in the Homeland, who referred to Paranos as “the greatest inquisitor of our people.”

== Emigration and death ==
Ilija Paranos resigned from his position as head of the Special Police on October 4, 1944. Just before the liberation of Belgrade, he fled the city along with other members of the apparatus of the Government of National Salvation, traveling to Vienna. He later returned to Postojna, where he was captured by Italian partisans and handed over to the Western Allies.

Although Friedrich Pops informed the new authorities in 1944 that Paranos had saved his life, this testimony was disregarded, and Paranos was labeled a war criminal. He was deported to the Santa Cesarea camp and subsequently handed over to the new Yugoslav communist authorities.

During an attempt to transfer him, Paranos leapt from a train window and died.

== Cultural portrayals ==
The character of Ilija Paranos was portrayed by actor Miodrag Lončar in the 1984 TV series Banjica. In the series Otpisani, a character inspired by Paranos, named Krsta Mišić, appears as the head of the Special Police, played by Vasa Pantelić.
