= Dragomir Jovanović =

Serbian politician and Axis collaborator

- Драгомир Јовановић
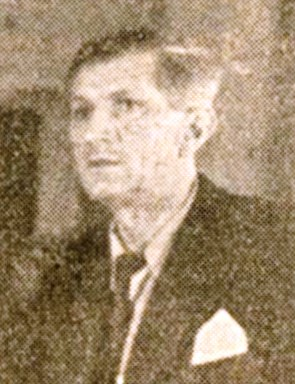
- Jovanović at his trial in Belgrade

Mayor of Belgrade
- In office 29 August 1941 – 20 October 1944
- Prime Minister: Milan Nedić
- Preceded by: Miloslav Stojadinović
- Succeeded by: Mihajlo Ratković

Personal details
- Born: 27 July 1902 Požarevac, Serbia
- Died: 17 July 1946 (aged 43) Belgrade, FPR Yugoslavia
- Children: 1
- Education: University of Belgrade
- Occupation: Police chief (1930s); Mayor (1941–44)

Military service
- Allegiance: Kingdom of Yugoslavia; Government of National Salvation
- Years of service: 1930–1945
- Rank: Chief of Police; Commander
- Commands: Belgrade Special Police; Serbian State Guard; Serbian State Security

Dragomir "Dragi" Jovanović (Serbian Cyrillic: Драгомир Јовановић; 27 July 1902 – 17 July 1946) was a Serbian politician and Axis collaborator who served as the mayor of Belgrade from 1941 to 1944, during World War II. He was captured by communist forces on 11 December 1945 in Munich, in Allied occupied Germany following the war, and tried alongside other Serbian collaborationist leaders in 1946. He was found guilty of collaborating with Reinhard Heydrich and Heinrich Himmler and other German officials and executed in Belgrade.

== Early life ==
Dragomir (Dragi) Jovanović was born on 27 June 1902 in Požarevac to Ljubomir and Vilma Jovanović (née Draškoci). Jovanović was married and had one child. He was a Nazi sympathizer before the outbreak of World War II. His links to German intelligence services dated back to the mid-1930s. On 10 May 1939 Dragomir went to the Berghof near Berchtesgaden to meet with Reinhard Heydrich, Heinrich Himmler and Karl Wolff.

== World War II ==
=== Mayor of Belgrade ===
On 17 April 1941, the day Yugoslavia surrendered to the Axis powers, Jovanović left the town of Gornji Milanovac and went to Belgrade. The following day, he was received by Gestapo officers Karl Kraus and Hans Helm. The two suggested that he reorganize the Belgrade police and take control of the city's government. The German field commander in Belgrade, Colonel Ernst Moritz von Kaisenberg, then appointed Jovanović to the position of extraordinary commissar for the city. As mayor, Jovanović proposed that Belgrade be divided into sixteen boroughs and two commissariats and that the local police be used to quell anti-German acts in the city. The Germans accepted this plan. The Belgrade police was organized in mid-May 1941 and grew to a size of 878 police officers and 240 agents by the following month. That summer, Jovanović was appointed chief of Serbian State Security (Serbian: Srpska državna bezbednost, SDB) by SS-Gruppenführer und Generalleutnant der Polizei (SS-General of Police) August Meyszner. The SDB assumed the administration of the Serbian State Guard (Srpska državna straža, SDS). In early July, the Germans ordered Jovanović to convert the former 18th Infantry army barracks of the Royal Yugoslav Army into the Banjica concentration camp. Banjica held 23,697 inmates throughout the war, 3,849 of whom perished. According to the post-war testimony of the camp's administrator, Svetozar Vujković, Jovanović saved countless Serb civilians from being executed as German hostages by swapping them with Roma prisoners. In his own post-war testimony, Jovanović recounted an incident in which he recognized a wounded Yugoslav prisoner of war as a Jew. He claimed to have singled the officer out and reported him to the Germans, who arrested him and took him to Banjica, where he was shot.

Beginning in mid-1942, Jovanović provided financial aid to the Chetniks of Draža Mihailović from his own personal fund. By late 1943, he was working as a Chetnik agent within the Serbian collaborationist government. In mid-August 1944, Jovanović, Mihailović and Nedić secretly met in the village of Ražana, where Nedić agreed to give one-hundred million dinars for wages and to request from the Germans arms and ammunition for Mihailović.

=== Escape, capture and death ===
Jovanović left Belgrade in early October 1944, alongside other Serbian collaborationist leaders. He was captured following the war and tried as part of the Belgrade Process in 1946. He was found guilty of collaborating with the Germans and was executed by firing squad in Belgrade on 17 July 1946.
