= Ledine, Serbia =

Ledine Ледине
- Urban neighbourhood
- Location within Belgrade
- Coordinates: 44°48′N 20°21′E
- Country: Serbia
- Region: Belgrade
- Municipality: New Belgrade

Area
  - Total: 5.65 km^{2} (2.18 sq mi)
- Time zone: UTC+1 (CET)
  - Summer (DST): UTC+2 (CEST)
- Area code: +381(0)11
- Car plates: BG

Ledine (Serbian: Ледине) is an urban neighborhood of Belgrade, the capital of Serbia. It is located in the municipality of New Belgrade.

== Location ==
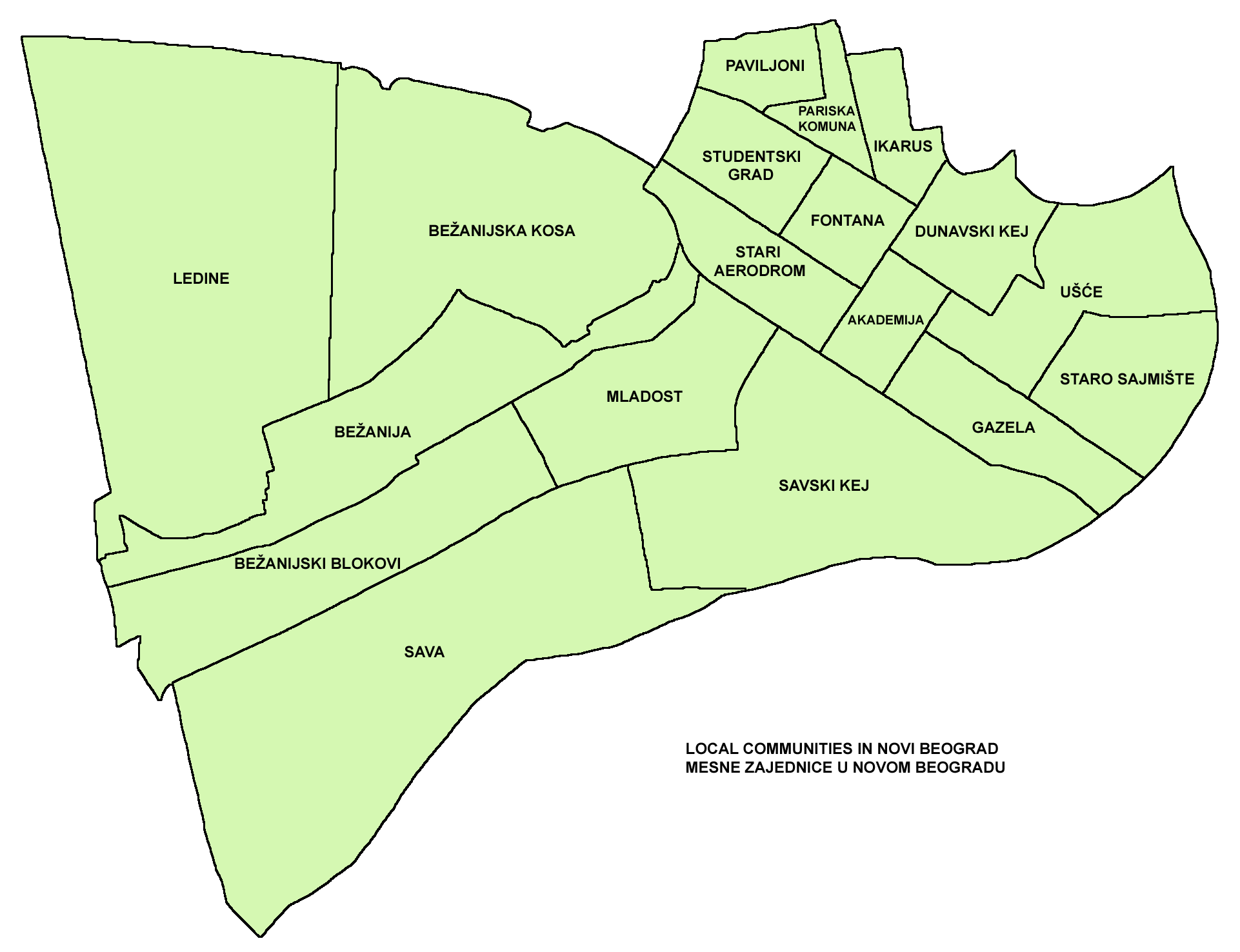
Map of Local communities in Novi Beograd

Ledine is the westernmost settlement in the municipality, formerly developed as a sort of an informal settlement outside the projected area of the city of New Belgrade. Today it is urbanistically connected to the neighborhoods of Bežanija and Dr Ivan Ribar by the narrow urban strip along Vinogradska and Surčinska streets. The settlement itself is built between these two streets, both of which connect Belgrade and Surčin and along which a continuous built-up area of Belgrade-Ledine-Surčin is being formed.

== History ==
The settlement began to develop in 1961. It was formed as a result of the resettlement of inhabitants from Jatagan Mala, a shanty town in old part of Belgrade, across the Sava river. Jatagan Mala was demolished in the process of city beautification due to the First Summit of the Non-Aligned countries.

== Characteristics ==
Historical population
Year	Pop.	±%
1981	2,576	—
1991	3,060	+18.8%
2002	3,688	+20.5%
2011	6,813	+84.7%

Ledine experiences all the problems of the non-planned neighborhoods of Belgrade, mostly concerning communal problems. The population of the settlement was 6,813 in 2011.

As the settlement originated on barren meadows outside any urban area, it got the descriptive name ledine, Serbian for the heaths.

Elementary school was opened in 1961, originally for 200 pupils. In 1966 it was named after the World War II combatant and people's hero Vlada Obradović Kameni, when his bust, on the tall pedestal was placed in the schoolyard. The bust was vandalized in the early 2020a.

== Trostruki Surduk ==
Ledine is also site of the Jewish memorial cemetery, commemorating killing of 240–450 Jews and Roma by the German occupational forces from October 1941 to February 1942 in the nearby small valley called Trostruki surduk. The memorial was built on 20 October 1964 and in 1992, it was declared a cultural monument. The memorial was restored in 2008.
