= Alkalaj =

Alkalaj is a surname. Notable people with the surname include:

- Olga Alkalaj (1907–1942), Yugoslav lawyer and activist
- Sven Alkalaj (born 1948), Bosnian-Croatian diplomat
