= Trostruki surduk =

Trostruki surduk is the name of a place in Belgrade, Serbia, between Bežanija and Surčin, where the mass murder of 240–450 Jews during World War II was organized. The exact number of murdered people, date of execution and the concentration camp that they were brought from remains unknown.

There are sources with information that the murders were executed at the end of September 1941 and that the Jews who were murdered were brought from the concentration camp of Topovske Šupe. Information from other sources led to the conclusion that the murders was executed in February 1942 and that Jews who were murdered in Trostruki surduk were brought from Sajmište concentration camp. Finally, some sources state that the mass murder of Jews was executed on October 17, 1941 and that they were brought to Trostruki surduk from Banjica concentration camp.
