= Airport City Belgrade =

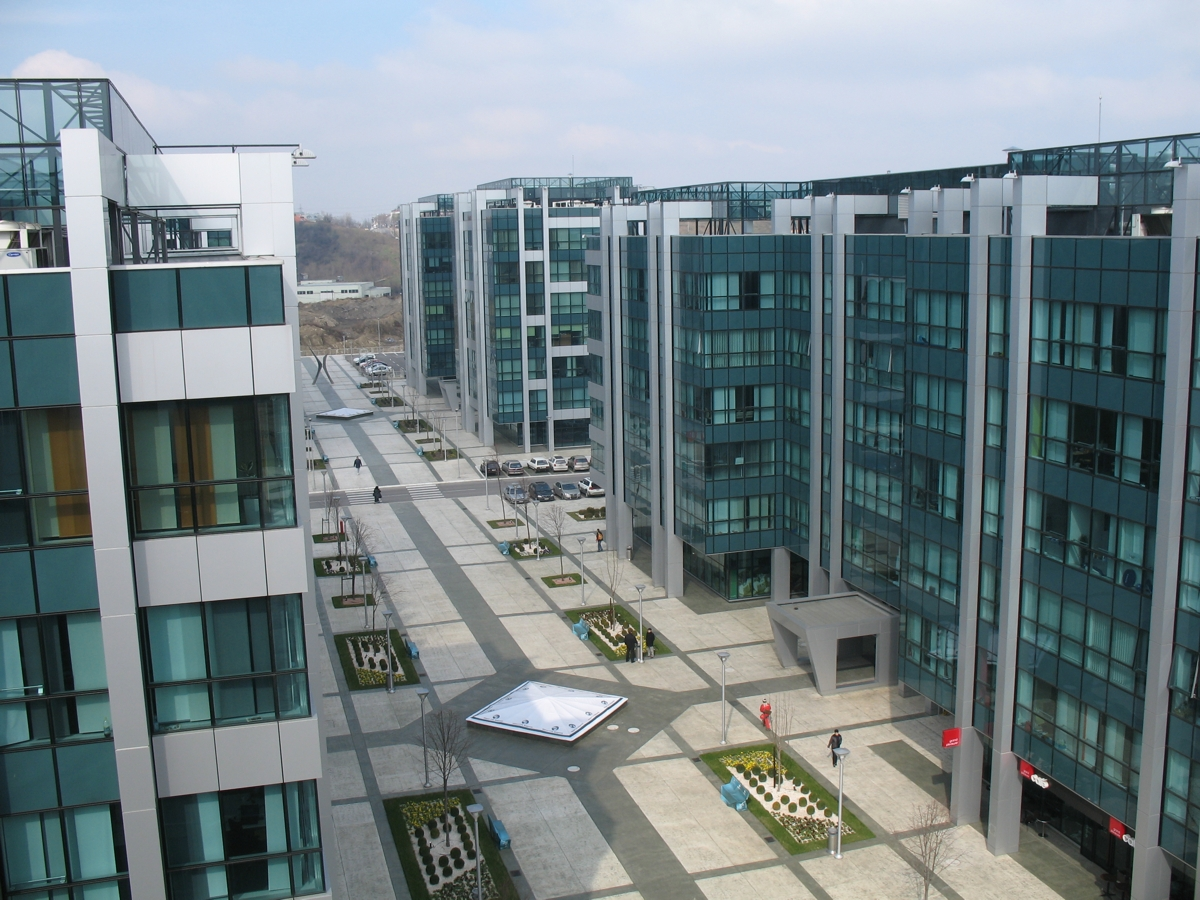
- View on Airport City Belgrade (2009)

- Location within Belgrade

General information
- Type: Multi-use commercial
- Location: Block 65, New Belgrade, Belgrade, Serbia
- Coordinates: 44°48′43.43″N 20°23′51.63″E

Technical details
- Floor area: 230,000 sqm2

Airport City Belgrade (Serbian: Ерпорт Сити Београд, romanized: Erport Siti Beograd; abbr. ACB) is a business park and a commercial neighborhood of Belgrade, the capital of Serbia. It is a multi-use commercial facility, located in the municipality of New Belgrade.

== Location ==
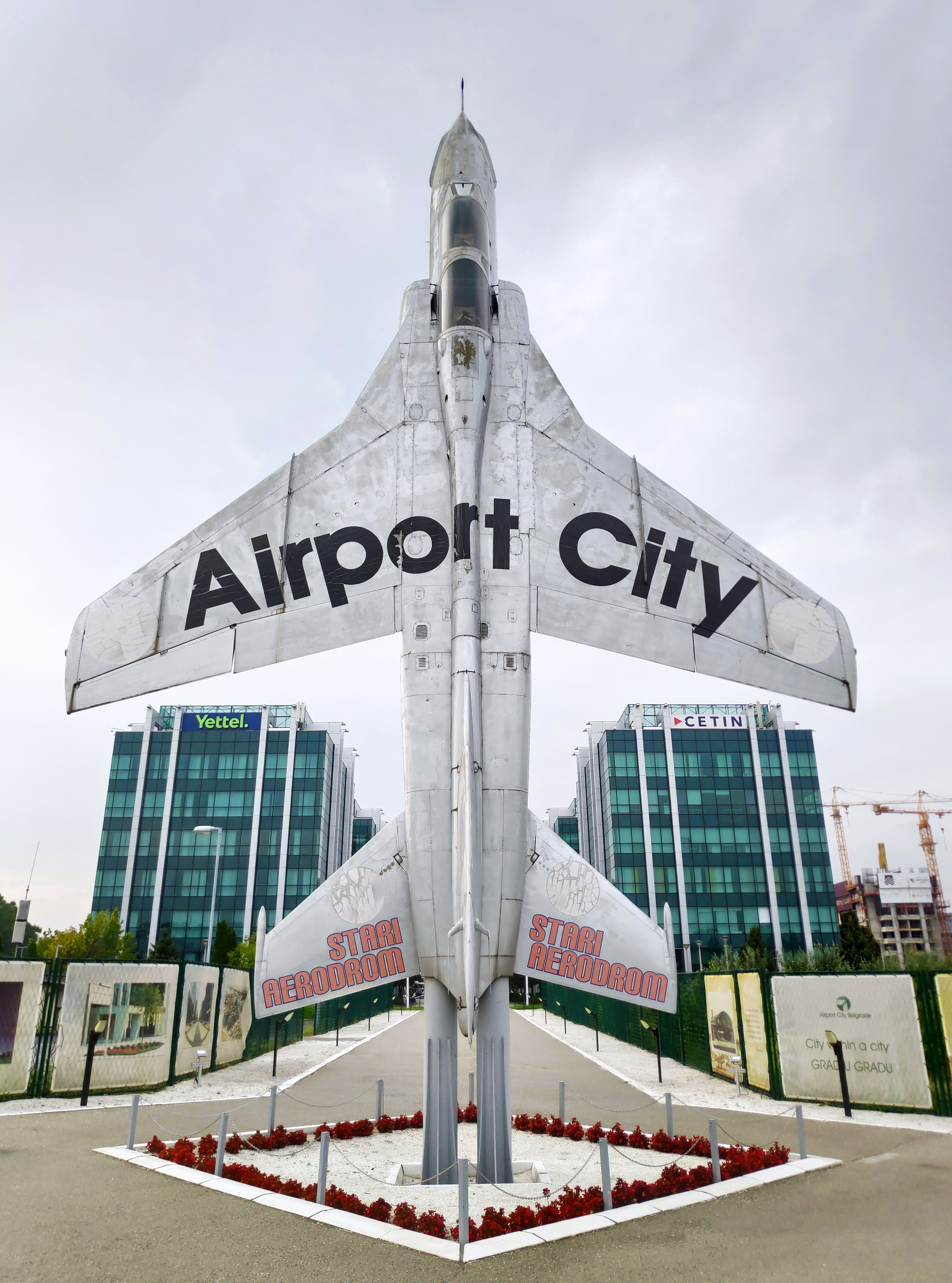
Airport City with Soko J-22 Orao jet (2022)

Airport City is located in New Belgrade's Block 65, in the area previously known as Dojno Polje. To the east and northeast it borders the neighborhoods of Bežanija and Bežanijska Kosa. The Tošin Bunar Street marks the east border of the neighborhood, Omladinskih Brigada the northeast and Djordja Stojanovića the south. On the north there are other facilities in the Block 65, including the residential complex West 65 and the headquarters of the N1 Television. Southwest from Airport City is the vast, former industrial complex, which includes the factories like the Industry of Machinery and Tractors and the Industry of Metal Castings. In the vicinity, in the southeast direction are the neighborhood of Belville and the Delta City shopping mall.

== Dojno Polje Airport ==
West of Bežanija and 2 km (1.2 mi) south of Zemun, between the village and the Sava River, is the location of the old Belgrade airport, which was finished in March 1927. The locality was called Dojno Polje. Because it is located along Tošin Bunar Street, although administratively part of the village of Bežanija at the time, the airport is often referred to as both the Bežanija Airport and Airport on Tošin Bunar. Construction of an airfield began in 1923. An initiative asked for the creation of the airline company in 1926, which was approved by the government on 23 March 1926. Then the initial public offering began but largely failed as only 10% of the planned amount was gathered. According to the existing laws, the airline company was to be closed even before it was officially formed. In order to boost the sale of the shares, pilot Tadija Sondermajer decided to conduct the promotional flight Paris-Bombay-Belgrade. With his colleague Leonid Bajdak, he started the journey on 20 April 1927 from Paris, arriving back in Belgrade after 11 days and 14,800 km (9,200 mi), on 8 May. They were awaited as heroes by the crowd of 30,000. The sale of the shares was boosted and in three months there were sufficient funds for the company, named Aeroput and established on 17 June 1927, to purchase its first four airplanes.

A pre-war Royal Yugoslav AF base and civil airport serving the Belgrade area, Belgrad-Semlin (a.k.a. Zemun, Fliegerhorst Belgrade-Zemun) Airfield was adjacent to the Ikarus aircraft factory that produced parts for the Bf 109 and Bf 110 and employed 1,500 workers during the war, as well as the Rogožarski aircraft factory. Main refueling stopover for aircraft flying back and forth to Greece as well as being an important repair and maintenance hub for the Südost (Southeast) region. The Luftwaffe had an instrument flying school here for more than two years and fighters and bombers were based here for short periods, primarily to fly support for anti-partisan operations.

New administrative building was constructed in 1931 and to celebrate the occasion, a big air show of the biplanes was held. It was destroyed by the Germans in 1944, and became defunct in 1962 when the new airport near the village of Surčin was finished (today's Belgrade Nikola Tesla Airport). In April 2016 works began on the construction of the access road to the Ada Bridge. During works on the new boulevard, remnants of the old airport's runway, hangars and warehouses were discovered.

== History ==
Construction of Airport City began on 4 May 2005. In the first phase, a total of 4 buildings, out of planned 14, has been built (2 were finished by April, and 2 by June 2006). Then a second phase began. By March 2009 further 3 buildings were finished, or a total of 72,000 m^{2} (780,000 sq ft) out of planned 186.000 m^{2} (2,002.09 sq ft).

By December 2016, 9 buildings were finished. It was then announced that the capacity of the complex will be expanded to 230,000 m^{2} (2,500,000 sq ft).

== Characteristics ==
The project is often called "city within a city", spreading over an area of 14 ha (35 acres). It is the first multi-use commercial facility in Serbia that merges the latest in building technology, together with a tenant-focused approach. Complex consist of six 6-storey, one 10-storey, two 11-storey buildings. The last phase, which started in 2017 will have new 11-, 14- and two 23-storey buildings.

Mercedes-Benz, DHL, Siemens and other companies are located close to ACB in Novi Beograd, which is an emerging Central Business District. The buildings are located near (900 meters from) the Euro-Motorway E-75. Several lines of transportation are planned for day-and-night travel. Belgrade Nikola Tesla Airport is ten minutes away by car.

== See also ==
- Belgrade Nikola Tesla Airport
- Bežanija
- Tošin Bunar
