= Belgrade Special Police =

The Belgrade Special Police (Serbo-Croatian: Specijalna policija Uprave grada Beograda, SP UGB) was a Serbian collaborationist police organisation directed and controlled by the German Gestapo (German: Geheime Staatspolizei) in the German-occupied territory of Serbia from 1941 to 1944 during World War II. It grew out of the Belgrade General Police of the interwar period, which had a significant role in the suppression of the Communist Party of Yugoslavia after that organisation was banned in 1920. Ilija Paranos served as the head of the Special Police for most of the war. Eighty per cent of the work of the SP UGB was related to suspected communists. It initially had a responsibility to investigate other groups, such as the Chetniks of Draža Mihailović, but ended up cooperating with Mihailović's Chetnik movement instead. The SP UGB had significant autonomy in who it arrested, tortured and interrogated, and who it sent to the Banjica concentration camp, but it did not have the power to release prisoners from the camp, a power which was retained by the Gestapo. The SP UGB exchanged information with a number of different agencies, including the German military intelligence service, the Abwehr, and other collaborationist organisations such as the Serbian Volunteer Corps.

== Background ==
Following the 1938 Anschluss between Germany and Austria, Yugoslavia shared a border with the Third Reich and came under increasing pressure as her neighbours aligned themselves with the Axis powers. In April 1939, Italy opened a second frontier with Yugoslavia when it invaded and occupied neighbouring Albania. At the outbreak of World War II, the Yugoslav government declared its neutrality. Between September and November 1940, Hungary and Romania joined the Tripartite Pact, aligning themselves with the Axis, and Italy invaded Greece. From that time, Yugoslavia was almost completely surrounded by the Axis powers and their satellites, and her neutral stance toward the war became strained. In late February 1941, Bulgaria joined the Pact. The following day, German troops entered Bulgaria from Romania, closing the ring around Yugoslavia. Intending to secure his southern flank for the impending attack on the Soviet Union, Adolf Hitler began placing heavy pressure on Yugoslavia to join the Axis. On 25 March 1941, after some delay, the Yugoslav government conditionally signed the Pact. Two days later, a group of pro-Western, Serbian nationalist Royal Yugoslav Air Force officers deposed the country's regent, Prince Paul, in a bloodless coup d'état, placed his teenaged nephew Peter on the throne, and brought to power a "government of national unity" led by General Dušan Simović. The coup enraged Hitler, who immediately ordered the country's invasion, which commenced on 6 April 1941.

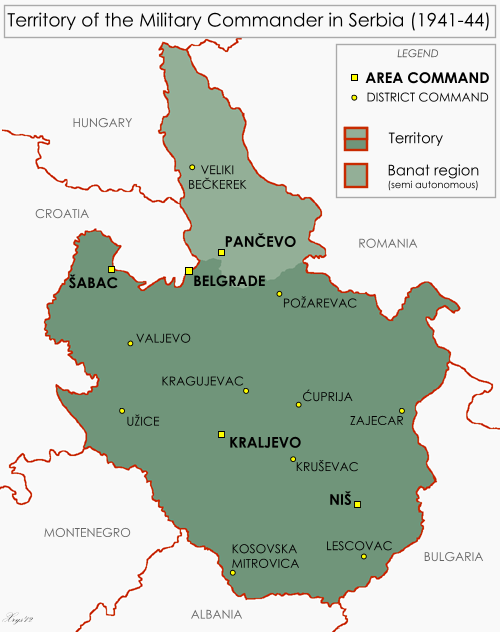
Map of the German-occupied territory of Serbia

Yugoslavia was quickly overwhelmed by the combined strength of the Axis powers and surrendered in less than two weeks. The government and royal family went into exile, and the country was occupied and dismembered by its neighbours. The German-occupied territory of Serbia was reduced to the Kingdom of Serbia's pre-Balkan War borders and was kept under direct military occupation by the Germans due to the key rail and riverine transport routes that passed through it, as well as its valuable resources, particularly non-ferrous metals. The occupied territory covered about 51,000 km^{2} and had a population of 3.8 million. The Germans began searching for a Serb suitable to lead a puppet government in Belgrade.

== Establishment ==
On 21 April 1941, the German military area commander for Belgrade, Oberst Ernst Moritz von Kaisenberg, appointed Dragomir Jovanović to lead the city administration. In mid-May 1941, Jovanović established a special squad of 55 police agents, who were directly tasked by the overall German police and security organisation, Einsatzgruppe Serbia, with finding, arresting and questioning communists in Belgrade. This squad grew out of the Belgrade General Police of the interwar period, which included a political police organisation and had been closely involved in the suppression of the Communist Party of Yugoslavia since it was banned in 1920. The Belgrade General Police had also been involved in overseeing cultural and sports organisations, and had paid special attention to the University of Belgrade, a focal point of libertarian thought in interwar Yugoslavia. The pre-war chief of the anti-communist Section IV of the Belgrade General Police was Svetozar Vujković, and his deputies were Stevan Šterić and Brana Božić, and a key agent in Vujković's section was Đorđe Kosmajac. For a short time, the chief of the SP UGB was Mija Petrović, but he was replaced after about a month by Ilija Paranos. The Gestapo had encountered Paranos during Hermann Göring's 1936 visit to Yugoslavia to meet with Yugoslav Prime Minister Milan Stojadinović, and they considered him an experienced and loyal officer.

On 30 April 1941, the Germans settled on a leader for the Serbian puppet administration, Milan Aćimović, a staunch anti-communist who served as Yugoslavia's Minister of Internal Affairs during the winter of 1939–40. However, the SP UGB did not come under the control of Aćimović's Commissioner Government, and remained under Gestapo control. Two resistance movements emerged following the invasion: the communist-led Partisans, and the royalist, Serbian nationalist Chetniks. The Partisans were led by the revolutionary Josip Broz Tito, while the Chetniks were led by Colonel Draža Mihailović, an officer in the interwar Royal Yugoslav Army. The two movements had widely diverging goals. Whereas the Partisans sought to turn Yugoslavia into a communist state under Tito's leadership, the Chetniks sought a return to the pre-war status quo, whereby the Yugoslav monarchy—and by extension, Serb political hegemony—would be restored. The Banjica concentration camp was established on 22 June 1941, by order of the head of the German military occupation administration in Serbia, Harald Turner, to the leader of the Serbian collaborationist administration, Milan Aćimović. The purpose of the camp was to hold communists arrested by the Gestapo and SP UGB. The staff of the camp, led by Vujković, took over the camp on 5 July, and it admitted its first inmates on 9 July. Communist resistance commenced in early July, shortly after the invasion of the Soviet Union, targeting both the Germans and the puppet authorities. By the time of the communist-led uprising, the SP UGB was receiving praise from von Kaisenberg, as well as knives, rubber truncheons, rifles and handguns. There was a rapid increase in the size of the SP UGB after the uprising began. The SP UGB operated a network of informants who reported on the arrival of suspicious persons, meetings and conversations, and conducted regular inspections of companies, factories, institutions and hospitals.

== Structure and headquarters ==
With minor changes, the SP UGB mirrored the organisation of the Belgrade General Police. It consisted of five sections:

- Section I – Administration, led by Bora Mirković
- Section II – Foreigners, commanded by Josip Vučinić
- Section III – Chetniks of Draža Mihailović, led by Nikola Gubarev
- Section IV – Communists, commanded by Boško Bećarević
- Section V – Central Registry, led by Đorđe Đorđević

The remit of Section II was severely restricted, as the Gestapo maintained responsibility for monitoring and dealing with all foreigners in the occupied territory. During the occupation, 15,000 communist suspects from Belgrade were processed by Section IV, with that section responsible for over eighty per cent of all tasks undertaken by the SP UGB. The SP UGB was housed in a building at the corner of Takovska and Dalmatinska Streets. Belgrade. Although the SP UGB was tied to the administration of the City of Belgrade, it began to send teams of agents to regional centres, such as Niš, Kragujevac, Šabac, Valjevo, Požarevac and Leskovac. Šterić was sent to head the SP UGB office in Kragujevac. Formally, these teams were subordinated to the area and district chiefs of the puppet administration, which mirrored the military area and district commands, but they were in regular contact with the local offices of the Gestapo in the various towns, and also sent reports to SP UGB headquarters. The SP UGB even tried to extend its reach to Yugoslav forced labourers and prisoners of war held in Germany.

== Operations ==
The SP UGB operated on its own initiative to arrest, torture and interrogate communists, but was sometimes ordered by the Gestapo to arrest specific people. For example, in November 1941, the head of Einsatzgruppe Serbien directed the SP UGB to conduct an investigation into the "Snaga i svetlost" power station, where, according to German information, there was a grouping of communists. The SP UGB subsequently arrested several suspected communists and sent them to the Banjica concentration camp. However, while the SP UGB had a certain amount of autonomy in the arrest of people, they did not have any such autonomy in the release of prisoners from the Banjica camp. The SP UGB would make a recommendation, often accompanied by the views of the puppet regime, but only the Gestapo could approve release. In some cases, the Gestapo would refuse such requests without an explanation. Jovanović later established the State Security Service (Serbo-Croatian: Služba državne bezbednosti, SDB), and after its establishment, the SP UGB regularly exchanged information with it. The SP UGB also exchanged information with the collaborationist Serbian Volunteer Corps, the German military intelligence bureau, the Abwehr, and Mihailović's Chetniks. SP UGB agents were awarded cash bonuses for their efforts in combating communists. Jovanović's influence over the operations of the SP UGB was undeniable, particularly during round-ups and arrests in Belgrade, and also in decisions made about the categorisation and shooting of prisoners at the Banjica concentration camp, where many communists and others were taken by the SP UGB after interrogation. On September 11, 1943, Special Police, alongside Serbian State Guard and battalion of Posava brigade of Chetniks, blockaded pro-Partisan village of Vranić, near Belgrade. One villager was killed by Chetniks and around a dozen were arrested, 4 of which were taken to prison Special Police, where they were interrogated and tortured, and later isolated at Banjica concentration camp. During the war, 31 villagers of Vranić were imprisoned at Banjica, six of them were executed by the Germans. From spring of 1944 onwards, executive department of Special Police was involved in several executions of inmates from Banjica camp on two locations in Belgrade.
