= Jajinci Memorial Park =

Park in Belgrade, Serbia

Coordinates: 44.73°N 20.49°E

- Interactive map of Jajinci Memorial Park

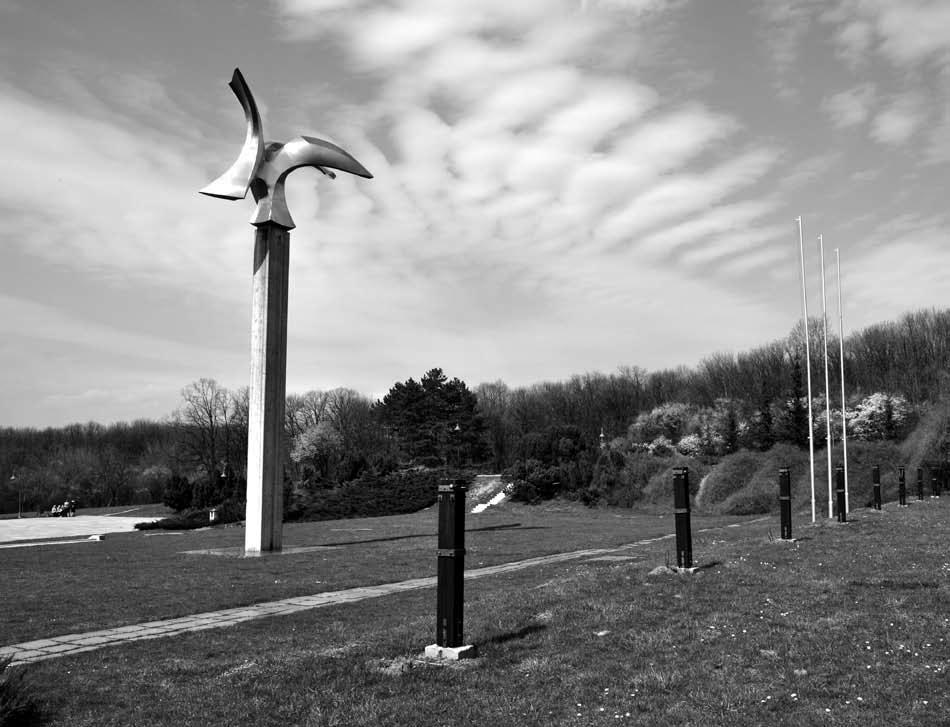
Memorial Park Jajinci

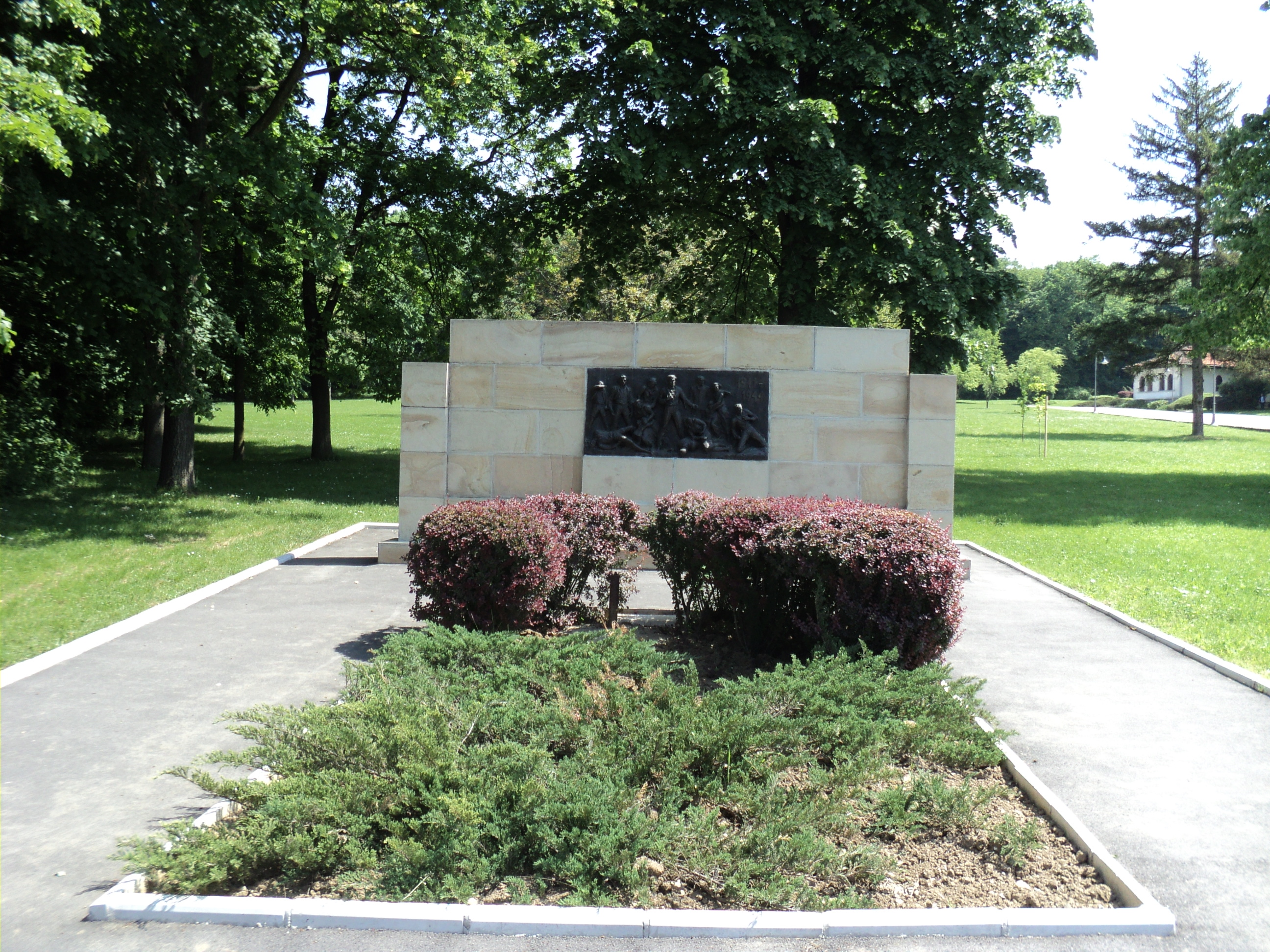
A monument to those executed at the Jajinci firing range

A World War II memorial park exists in the Belgrade neighbourhood of Jajinci. It was built in a former firing range that had once served as a mass execution site, a place of suffering of the innocent population on the territory of Nazi-occupied Serbia.

== History ==
The Axis powers waged total war that ignored international law and committed numerous war crimes and genocide. After their invasion of Yugoslavia in 1941, the population of Serbia was subjected to the same through a system of prisons, concentration camps and execution places. Immediately after the German occupying troops entered Belgrade on April 12, 1941, reprisals against the population began. They introduced the practice of constant holding of hostages and the threat of their execution, if in any way others resisted the occupiers.

Concentration camps were established in "Topovske šupe" in Autokomanda which was an urban area of Belgrade, in the Banjica concentration camp in the barracks of 18th Infantry Regiment likewise located in an urban area, the concentration camp Sajmište in the facilities of the former Fair Complex on the left bank of the Sava river and "Milišića ciglana" in Zvezdara. Belgrade was the only capital city in occupied Europe whose urban land was used for concentration camps.

The executions, organized and conducted by the German occupying forces, lasted every day from July 15, 1941 until the end of 1943. The liquidation of hostages and prisoners was conducted at several locations in Belgrade and its surroundings: Bežanijska kosa, Jewish Cemetery, Bubanj Potok, Central Cemetery, Marinkova bara, villages of Jabuka, Skela, Mali Požarevac, Ralja.

== Shooting range ==
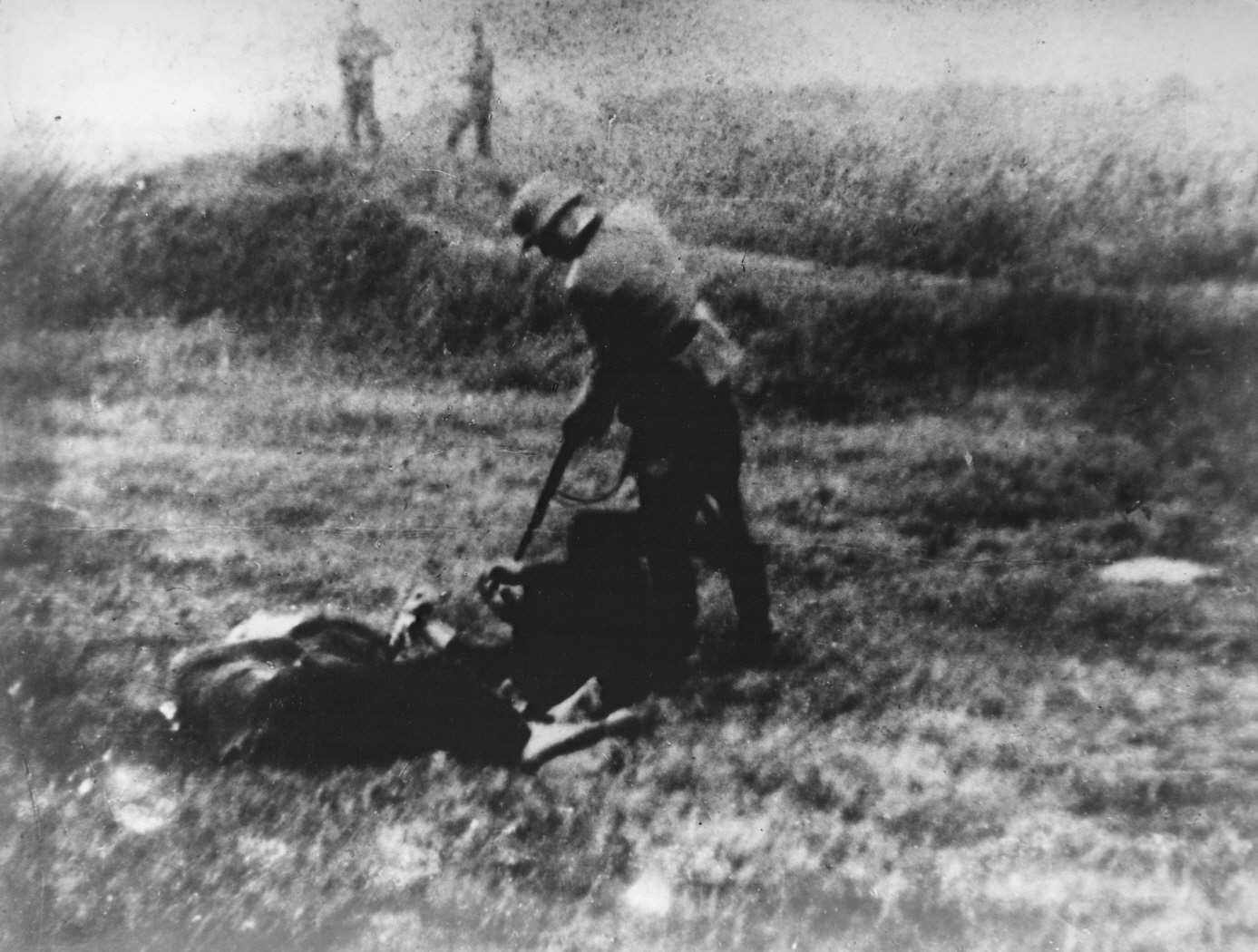
A German soldier points his rifle at a prisoner in Jajinci

On the 11th kilometre on the way to the Аvala mountain, near the village of Jajinci, there was a military shooting range previously used by the Armed Forces of the Kingdom of Yugoslavia. It is located in the south of the Belgrade municipality of Voždovac.

Shooting range in Jajinci, by number of victims and brutal methodology in liquidation and concealing crimes against innocent civilians, stands out from all the other places for execution. The preserved photos and statements of a small number of survivors testify to suffering and pain of Serbs, Jews, Roma and other hostages of fascist regime in Belgrade and Serbia. In the period from 8 November 1943 to 2 April 1944, seeking to remove the traces of mass crimes, the Gestapo conducted the organized exhumation and the burning of the remains of victims.

The War Crimes Commission, formed immediately after the Second World War, after the investigation, gave the information that 82,000 people were killed at the shooting range Jajinci. The recent researches indicate the number of 65,000 killed.

The Generals Peko Dapčević and Vladimir Ivanovič Ždanov, commanders of troops that liberated Belgrade on October 20, 1944, laid the first wreaths at the place where mass executions were carried out, which represents even the first homage paid to innocent victims of fascist terror.

== Memorial foundation ==
Memorial Park Jajinci consists of several segments and its formation started on July 7, 1951, by placing the monument at the entrance of the memorial complex. The academic sculptor Stevan Bodnarov. and the architect Leon Kabiljo are the authors of this monument.

The Park was formally established in 1960.

A large memorial park, with a monument to the victims, was opened on 20 October 1964, marking the 20th anniversary of the Partisan army entering Belgrade.

The works on the Memorial Park continued in the coming decades. City authorities tried to construct the proper memorial for a long time. A lot of unrealized public competitions for design of the monument dedicated to the victims of fascism.

In 1986, by the Decision of the Assembly of the City of Belgrade, the Memorial Park Jajinci was proclaimed a cultural monument – important place.

In 1987, the city announced the third design competition for the memorial. Among 42 submitted works, the commission decided for the work of academic sculptor Vojin Stojić, a colossal monument. Architect Bogdan Bogdanović, head of the commission, noted that such work can't be done in concrete, as suggested by the author, so instead a sculpture of stainless steel was made. It was officially dedicated in 1988.

The architects Branko Bon and Brana Mirković participated in the arrangement of related facilities and green area of the Memorial Park.

== Recent times ==
The green and flat area of the Memorial Park Jajinci served as an open picnic and excursion area for decades, variously used for pets, sunbathing, children's birthdays, sports activities and auto races.

Deeming such use of the area with tens of thousands of executed victims buried under the ground anti-civilized, the Belgrade Museum of Genocide Victims officially asked the government on 29 December 2021 to become the administrator of the memorial. The government remained silent until November 2022 when videos and photos of quads revving engines and speeding over the burial ground surfaced. Though this wasn't the first time it happened, this time it caused a public outcry, and government decided to hand over the memorial park to the museum via the expedited procedure.

In September 2023 the government transferred administration of the park to the museum, and construction of the new museum's building in Jajinci was announced.

== Sources and the literature ==
- The archives of Yugoslavia, Belgrade, The Fund of the State Commission for Investigating the Crimes of the Occupying Forces and Their Helpers.
- Milan Koljanin, German Concentration Camp on Belgrade fairground 1941-1944, Belgrade, 1992.
- Venceslav Glišić, The Crimes of the Nazis in Belgrade 1941-1944, Belgrade in the war and revolution 1941-1945, Belgrade, 1971.
