= Olga Alkalaj =

Yugoslav communist leader (1907–1942)

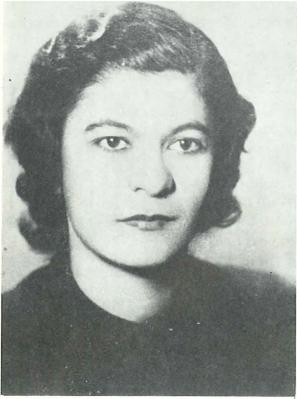
- Born: 23 November 1907; Belgrade
- Died: 15 March 1942 (aged 34); Banjica Concentration Camp
- Education: Belgrade Law School
- Occupations: Lawyer, activist

Olga Alkalaj (23 November 1907 – 15 March 1942) was a Yugoslav lawyer, activist for women's rights and a member of the Yugoslav Partisans during World War II.

== Biography ==
Alkalaj was born on 23 November 1907 in Belgrade, to a prominent Sephardi family. When she was still a high school student, she joined the youth communist movement and became a member of the League of Communist Youth of Yugoslavia. While a student at the Belgrade Law School, she was active in the student revolutionary movement and in 1923 became a member of the League of Communists of Yugoslavia (LCY).

She was one of the most active female members of the Communist League of Yugoslavia, in the Women's Movement in Belgrade. In 1938, she became a member of the Commission for the Advance of Women of the LCY in Serbia. Also, instructed by the party, she also worked in the editorial office of the feminist newspaper Žena danas. Before World War II, she was the secretary of the party in Belgrade, and also worked as a lawyer, defending fellow communists in court.

After the Axis invasion of Yugoslavia and the persecution of Jews in 1941, she lived undercover in Belgrade under a false identity, Sofija Aleksić, working as a maid. She also continued working for the party and participated in preparations for the uprising. She was behind the organization of the rescue of Aleksandar Ranković, member of the Central Committee of the Communist Party of Yugoslavia, from the prison hospital in Vidinskoj street in Belgrade in July 1941.

In September 1941, she was appointed as a temporary member of the Local Committee of the Communist Party of Yugoslavia in Belgrade. In November 1941, she was arrested by the Gestapo. Taken to the Banjica concentration camp, she was tortured in order to obtain information about other members of the Yugoslav resistance. Since nothing was obtained by the Nazis, she was transferred to the Sajmište concentration camp, but due to the serious injuries sustained during interrogation in Banjica, she had to be transferred to the Jewish Hospital in Belgrade.

The partisans in Belgrade organized her rescue, but she declined to escape for fear of the reprisals against the other Jewish patients already badly injured at the hospital. Following instructions of the Gestapo, she was taken from the hospital to a Gaswagen in Jajinci, where she was poisoned to death.

One street in the Belgrade suburb of Konjarnik is named after her.
