= Staro Slano =

Staro Slano Старо Слано
- Village
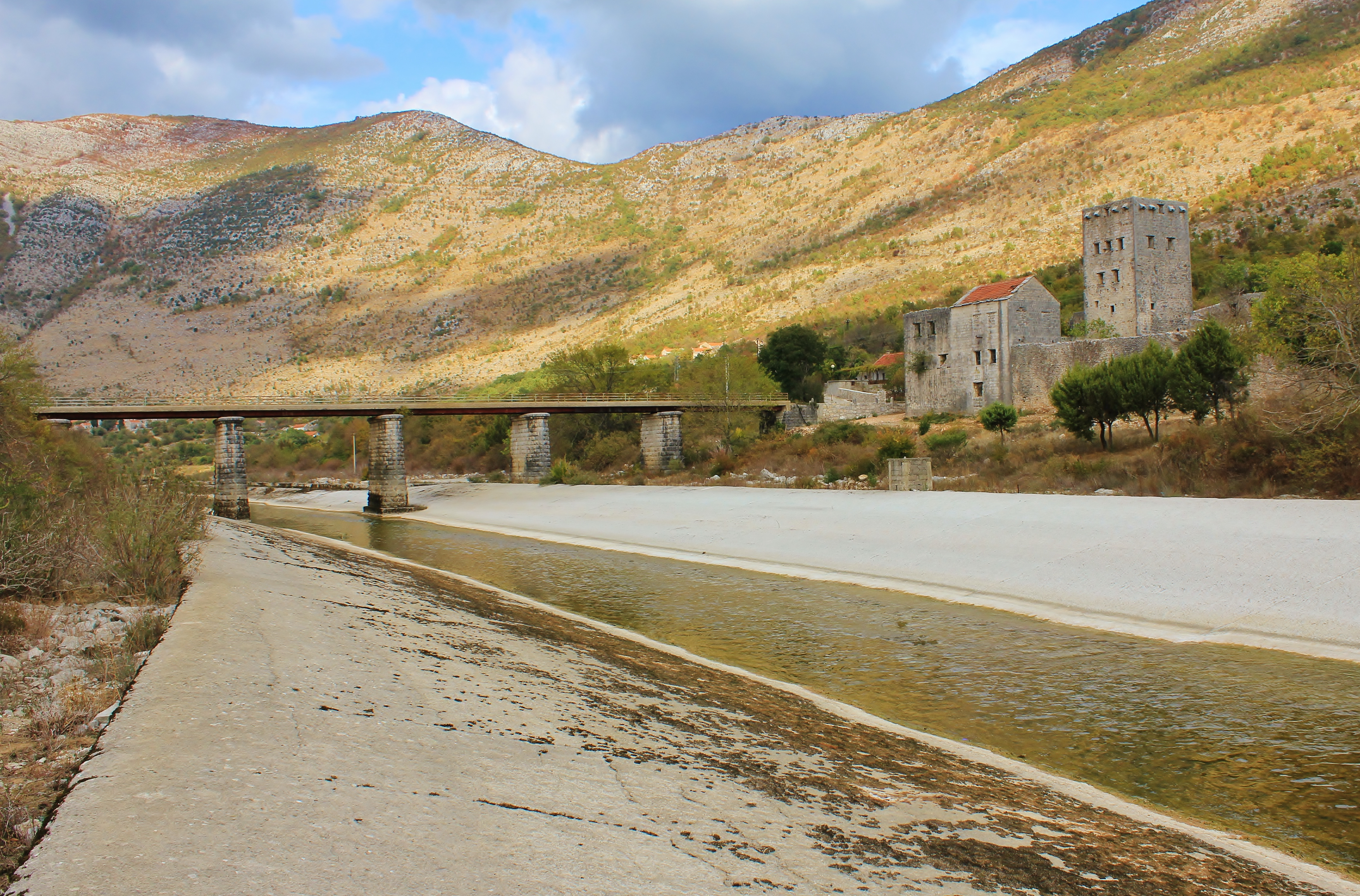
- Staro Slano

- Location within Bosnia and Herzegovina
- Coordinates: 42°46′N 18°14′E
- Country: Bosnia and Herzegovina
- Entity: Republika Srpska
- Municipality: Trebinje
- Time zone: UTC+1 (CET)
  - Summer (DST): UTC+2 (CEST)

Staro Slano (Serbian Cyrillic: Старо Слано) is a village in the municipality of Trebinje, Republika Srpska, Bosnia and Herzegovina.
