= Banjica concentration camp =

Nazi German concentration camp in modern-day Belgrade, Serbia

Banjica
- Concentration camp
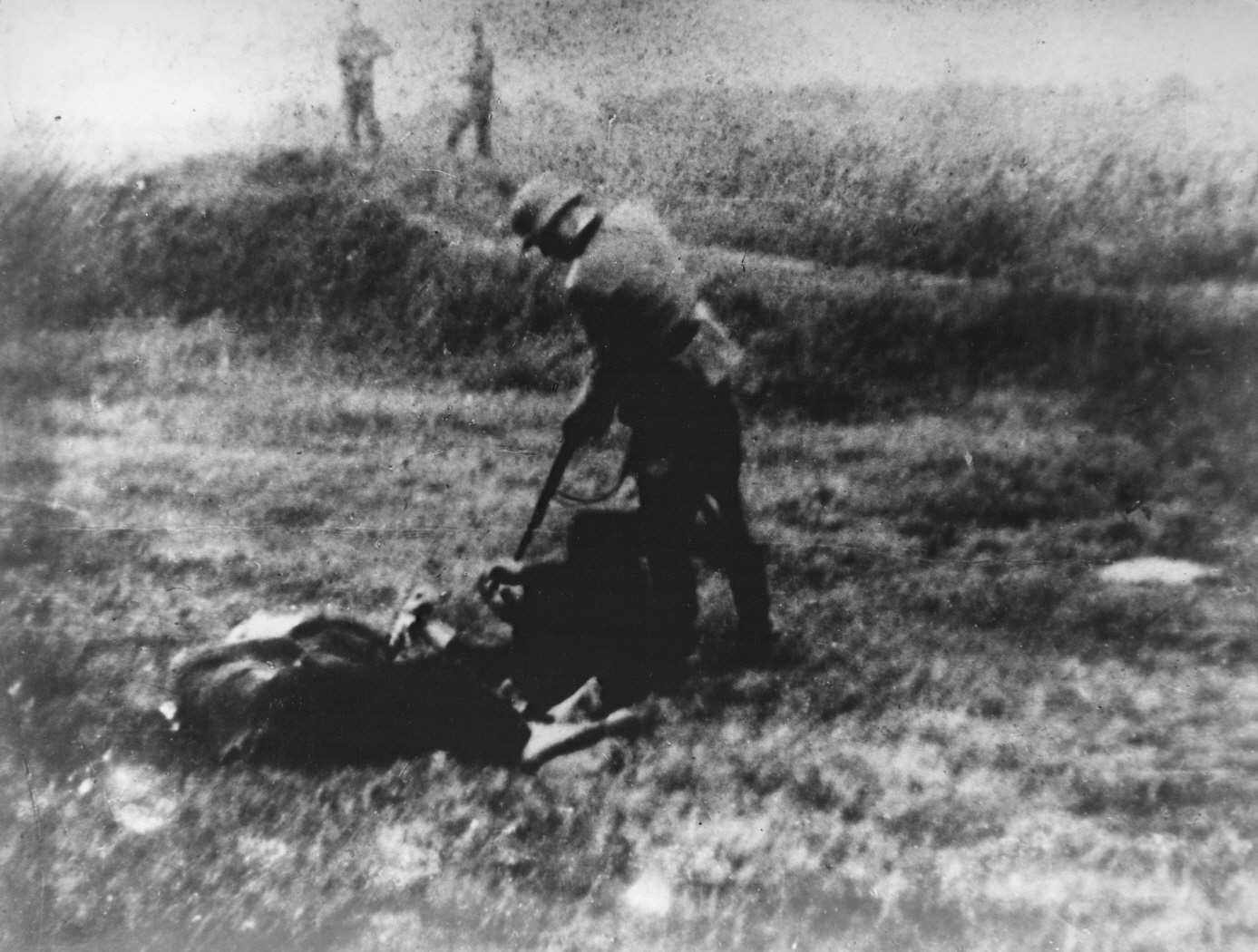
- A German soldier points his rifle at a prisoner at the Jajinci shooting ground, which served as an execution site for Banjica inmates.

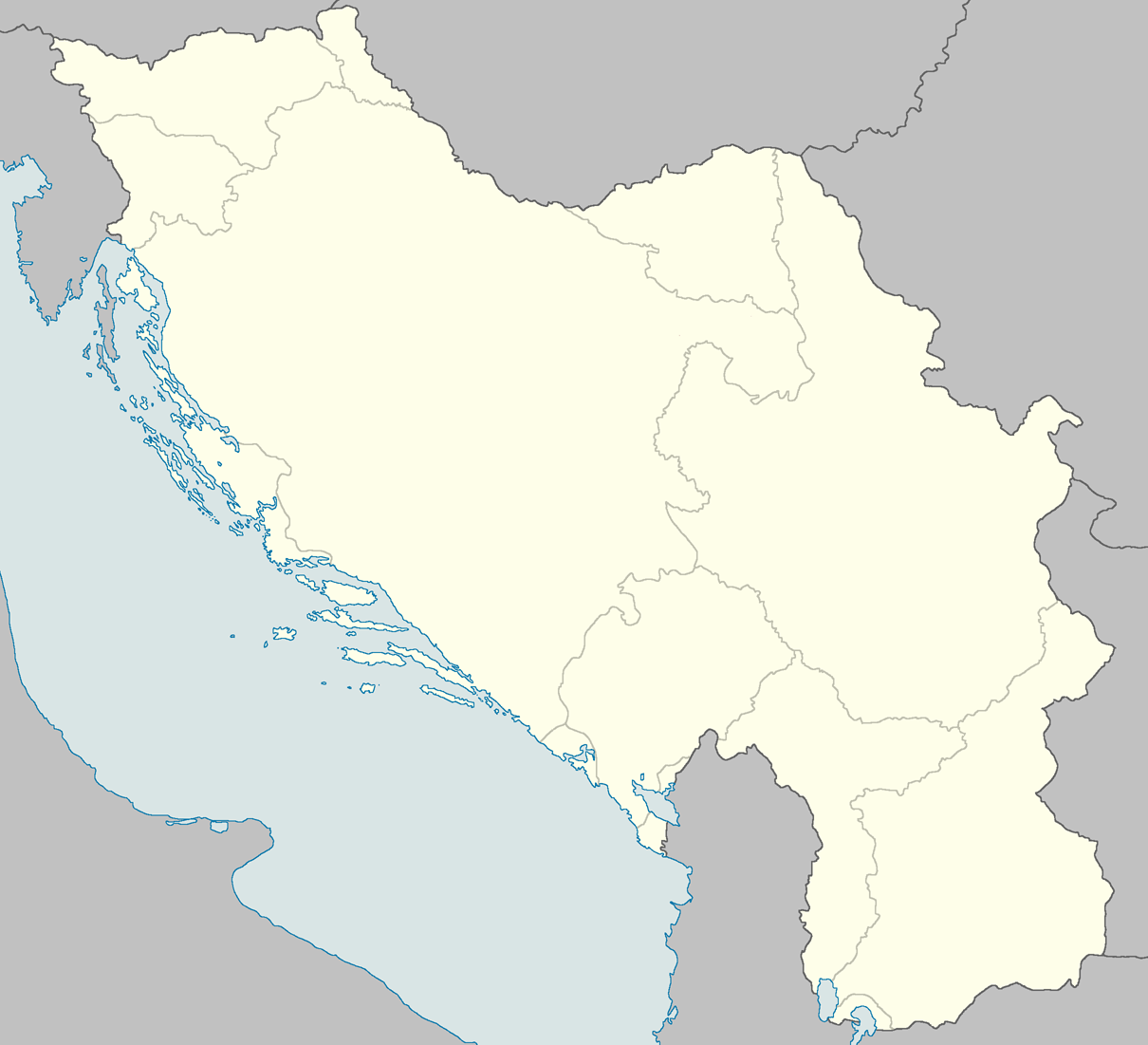
- Location of Banjica within occupied Yugoslavia
- Interactive map of Banjica
- Coordinates: 44°46′15″N 20°28′03″E
- Location: Banjica neighbourhood, Belgrade, Territory of the Military Commander in Serbia
- Operated by: Gestapo, Belgrade Special Police and Serbian State Guard
- Operational: 5 July 1941 – 3/4 October 1944
- Inmates: Primarily anti-fascist Serbs, Jews, Roma and other anti-fascist prisoners
- Number of inmates: 23,697
- Killed: At least 3,849

The Banjica concentration camp (German: KZ Banjica, Serbian: Бањички логор, Banjički logor) was a Nazi German concentration camp in the Territory of the Military Commander in Serbia, the military administration of the Third Reich established after the Invasion and occupation of Yugoslavia during World War II. In response to escalating resistance, the German army instituted severe repressive measures – mass executions of civilian hostages and the establishment of concentration camps. Located in the Banjica neighborhood of Dedinje—a suburb of Belgrade—it was originally used by the Germans as a center for holding hostages. The camp was later used to hold anti-fascist Serbs, Jews, Romani people, captured Partisans, Chetniks and other opponents of Nazi Germany. By 1942, most executions occurred at the firing ranges at Jajinci, Marinkova Bara and the Jewish cemetery.

Banjica was operational from July 1941 to October 1944. It was jointly run by German occupiers under the command of Gestapo official Willy Friedrich and the Milan Nedić's puppet government, which was under full control of the occupational forces. However although German forces took the leading and guiding role of the Final Solution in Serbia, and the Germans monopolized the killing of Jews, they were actively aided in that role by Serbian collaborators. Later, Friedrich was tried, found guilty and executed for war crimes by Yugoslavia's post-war communist authorities. 23,697 individuals were detained in Banjica throughout the war, at least 3,849 of whom perished. After the war, a small monument dedicated to the victims of the camp was constructed. The site is now a museum.

== Background ==
=== Prelude to the occupation ===
Following the 1938 Anschluss between Germany and Austria, Yugoslavia shared a border with the Third Reich and came under increasing pressure as her neighbours aligned themselves with the Axis powers. In April 1939, Italy opened a second frontier with Yugoslavia when it invaded and occupied neighbouring Albania. At the outbreak of World War II, the Yugoslav government declared its neutrality. Between September and November 1940, Hungary and Romania joined the Tripartite Pact, aligning themselves with the Axis, and Italy invaded Greece. From that time, Yugoslavia was almost completely surrounded by the Axis powers and their satellites, and her neutral stance toward the war became strained. In late February 1941, Bulgaria joined the Pact. The following day, German troops entered Bulgaria from Romania, closing the ring around Yugoslavia. Intending to secure his southern flank for the impending attack on the Soviet Union, Adolf Hitler began placing heavy pressure on Yugoslavia to join the Axis. On 25 March 1941, after some delay, the Yugoslav government conditionally signed the Pact. Two days later, a group of pro-Western, Serbian nationalist Royal Yugoslav Air Force officers deposed the country's regent, Prince Paul, in a bloodless coup d'état, placed his teenaged nephew Peter on the throne, and brought to power a "government of national unity" led by General Dušan Simović. The coup enraged Hitler, who immediately ordered the country's invasion, which commenced on 6 April 1941.

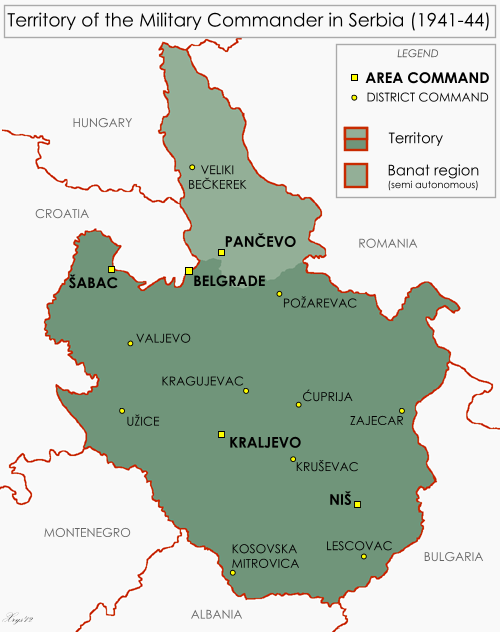
Map of the German-occupied territory of Serbia

=== Occupation ===
Yugoslavia was quickly overwhelmed by the combined strength of the Axis powers and surrendered in less than two weeks. The government and royal family went into exile, and the country was occupied and dismembered by its neighbours. The German-occupied territory of Serbia was reduced to the Kingdom of Serbia's pre-Balkan War borders and was kept under directly military occupation by the Germans due to the key rail and riverine transport routes that passed through it, as well as its valuable resources, particularly non-ferrous metals. The occupied territory covered about 51,000 km^{2} and had a population of 3.8 million.

==== Resistance and repression ====
Even before the Yugoslav Army surrendered, German military authorities ordered the registration of all Serbian Jews. On 30 May 1941 the German Military Commander in Serbia, Helmuth Förster, issued the main Race Laws, which excluded Jews and Roma from public and economic life, seized their property and required them to register for forced labor.

On July 7, 1941 Partisan-led armed resistance broke out in Serbia, quickly spreading and leading to the establishment of the first liberated territory in occupied Europe, the Republic of Užice. On Hitler's personal orders to crush the resistance in Serbia, the German military started shooting 100 hostages for every German killed, and 50 for every wounded. The Germans thus killed 30,000 Serbian civilians, including 3,000 in a mass execution at Kragujevac, and 2,000 at Kraljevo. Among the executed were thousands of Jewish men.

To crush the resistance and exterminate Jews, Germans also established concentration camps – at Banjica, Niš (Crveni krst), Sajmište, etc. – in which they interred Serb antifascists, Jews and Roma. Additionally, to fight the resistance, the Germans set up a quisling administration, under Milan Nedić, but he was given very limited powers, and was unable to establish order.

=== German occupation authorities ===
In order to establish the military occupation of the territory, the German Military Commander in Serbia was allocated a staff, divided into military and administrative branches, and he was allocated personnel to form four area commands and about ten district commands, which reported to the chief of the administrative staff, and the military staff allocated the troops of the four local defence battalions across the area commands. The first military commander in the occupied territory was General der Flieger Helmuth Förster, a Luftwaffe officer, appointed on 20 April 1941, assisted by the chief of the administrative staff, SS-Brigadeführer and State Councillor, Dr. Harald Turner. A further key figure in the initial German administration was SS-Standartenführer Wilhelm Fuchs, who commanded Einsatzgruppe Serbia, which was a grouping that included various detachments of the Reich Security Main Office (German: Reichssicherheitshauptamt, RSHA), including Gestapo (Secret State Police), Kriminalpolizei (Criminal Police, or Kripo), and Ausland-Sicherheitsdienst (Foreign Security Service, or Ausland-SD). Einsatzgruppe Serbien also controlled the 64th Reserve Police Battalion. While he was formally responsible to Turner, Fuchs reported directly to his superiors at the RSHA in Berlin.

=== Collaborationist puppet regime ===
The Germans began a search for a suitable Serb to lead a collaborationist regime in the occupied territory. Consideration was given to appointing Belgrade police chief Dragomir Jovanović, but the German Military Commander in Serbia selected former Yugoslav Minister of Internal Affairs Milan Aćimović. Aćimović formed his Commissioner Government (Serbo-Croatian: Komesarska vlada) on 30 May 1941, consisting of ten commissioners. Aćimović was virulently anti-communist and had been in contact with the German police before the war. Upon capturing Belgrade, the Germans ordered the city's 12,000 Jews to report themselves to the occupational authorities, and 9,145 did so. Jews were removed from all official posts by 14 May, and a series of anti-Jewish laws were passed prohibiting them from activities ranging from going to restaurants to riding streetcars.

== Establishment ==
The earliest written reference to the establishment of a concentration camp for communists and others considered "dangerous to public order" within Belgrade itself was a 26 May 1941 report of the Serbian Gendarmerie Command, which indicated that such a camp was being considered. In the same month, an order from Aćimović's Ministry of Internal Affairs (Serbo-Croatian: Ministarstvo unutrašnjih poslova, MUP) also mentioned a plan to establish a concentration camp to hold known communists and other persons. Following the invasion and defeat of Yugoslavia, the Communist Party of Yugoslavia had begun organising for an armed struggle against the occupiers and their local collaborators. On 19 June, the MUP held a conference with senior German police and members of the Belgrade Special Police (Serbo-Croatian: Specijalna policija Uprave grada Beograda, SP UGB), a collaborationist political police organisation that had been established in mid-May by Jovanović, who was now the German-appointed administrator of Belgrade. The conference decided to undertake a comprehensive preemptive campaign against the communists.

The camp was formally established prior to 22 June 1941, documented by a letter of that date from Turner to Aćimović. Responsibility for establishing the camp fell to Turner's deputy, SS-Sturmbannführer Georg Kiessel, who was responsible for overseeing Jovanović. In addition to his role as the administrator of Belgrade, Jovanović was also the chief of Serbian State Security for Aćimović's puppet regime. A three-man committee was created to determine the site for the camp. The committee consisted of Jovanović's deputy city administrator, Miodrag Đorđević, the chief engineer of Belgrade, Milan Janjušević, and an unnamed representative of the Gestapo. The committee chose the former barracks of the Royal Yugoslav Army's 18th Infantry Regiment, located in the Belgrade suburb of Banjica. Once the site was identified, the buildings had to be prepared for receiving a large number of prisoners, and secured against escape. Jovanović had overall responsibility for this work, with Janjušević managing the work at the camp. The former chief of the anti-communist section of the interwar Belgrade General Police, Svetozar Vujković, was appointed as the administrator of the camp, and he, his staff, and his German supervisors took over the camp on 5 July. The camp admitted its first inmates on 9 July, while building works were still ongoing. The first prisoners were held in one large basement room. For the first two months of its operation, the camp was surrounded by a barbed wire fence. As this was considered inadequate to prevent escape, Jovanović ordered Janjušević to build a masonry wall around the camp. In early September, construction commenced on the wall and a guardhouse. The wall was completed within a month, and was 5 metres (16 ft) high, enclosing the camp in the form of a pentagon, with towers set at each corner in which machine guns and searchlights were mounted. The camp was divided into sections, with one part for Gestapo prisoners, another for those arrested by the SP UGB, and a third area which held a mixed group of prisoners when either or both of the other two sections were at capacity. After the war, while he was being interrogated, Jovanović explained that this division had come about when "the Gestapo arrived one day without warning and decreed that one-third of the camp would belong to the Serbian authorities, and the rest they took for their prisoners". Initially the Gestapo and the Serbian State Guard jointly guarded the camp, but this was later delegated to the State Guard alone, according to Philip J. Cohen. Raphael Israeli writes that the camp was jointly administered by the German authorities and local collaborators, with the Gestapo supervising operations and carrying out most executions.

While Vujković was the administrator of the camp, he and his staff were at all times subject to the supervision of the Gestapo. The Germans often took decisions without reference to Vujković and his staff, but the Serbian staff were required to obtain approval from the Gestapo for nearly all actions they took. While the Gestapo were often harsher on the inmates than their quislings, on some occasions the Serbian staff were worse than the Gestapo. In the camp, Vujković together with the Germans selected prisoners for execution. On 19 February 1943 Vujković selected 215 prisoners of Banjica camp for execution. Hostages held to be killed in reprisal for attacks on German or Serbian collaborationist forces were generally held in the Gestapo section of the camp.

== Arrest, torture and transfer to the camp ==
Most of those detained at the camp were arrested by either the Gestapo or by the SP UGB acting as agents of the Gestapo. Some groups of prisoners were sent to the camp by Wehrmacht units or the SS who had rounded them up during counter-insurgency operations. Others were arrested by the German Feldgendarmerie (military police), mainly for minor offences against the occupation regime, but peasants were also arrested for failing to meet farm production quotas set by the German occupation authorities. Nearly 9,000 of the inmates were brought to the camp by Serbian collaborators. A detailed account of the organisations that arrested and brought inmates to the Banjica concentration camp is as follows:

Brought to the Banjica concentration camp by	Number
SS units and Gestapo	12,651
Regular German army	1,230
German Field Commands	1,018
Belgrade Special Police	4,076
Serbian police	2,533
Serbian State Guard, Ljotic's units and Chetniks	1,096
Criminal police	774
Unknown	319
Overall	23,637

== Operation ==
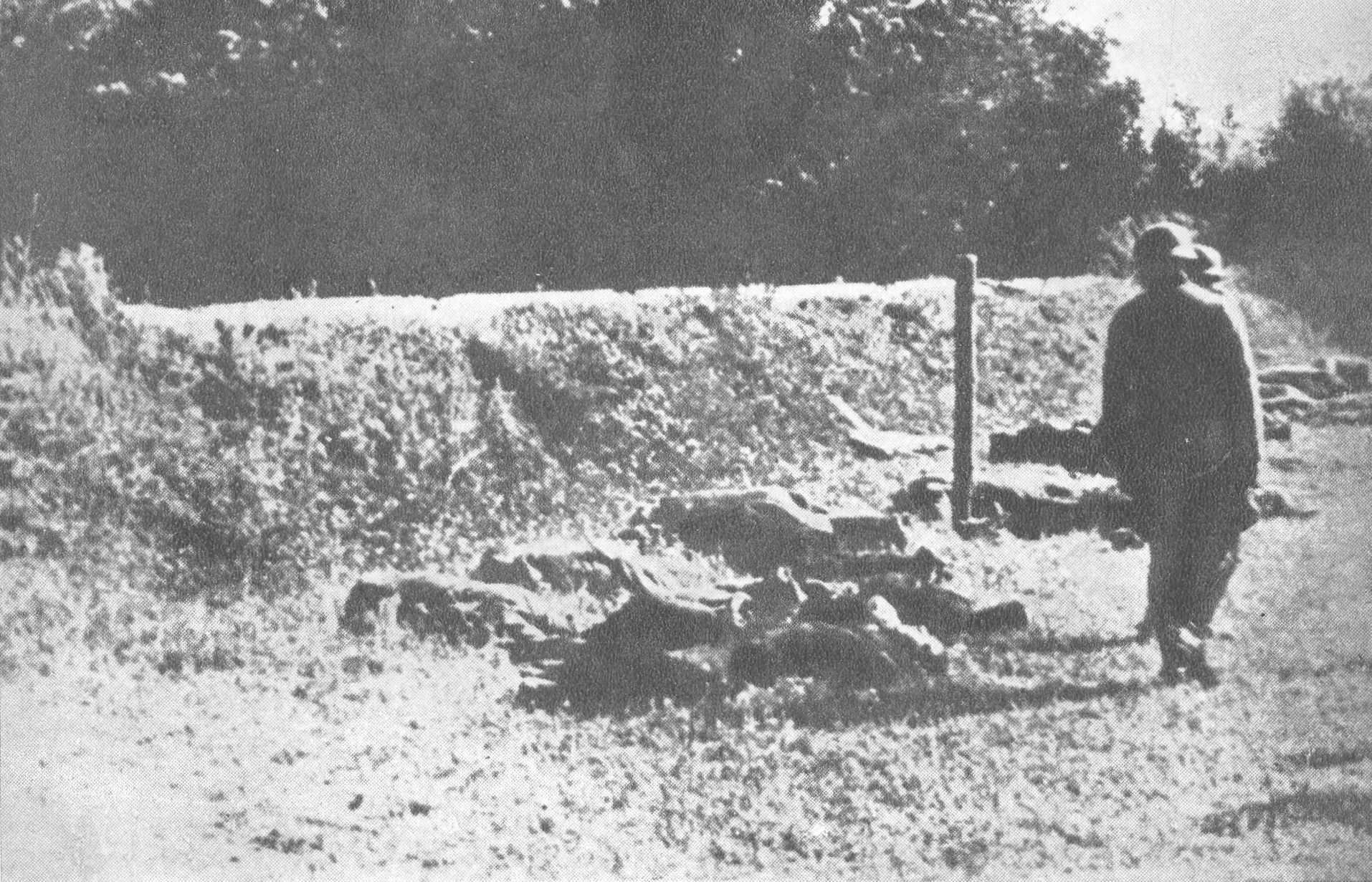
After the first execution in Banjica on 16 July 1941.

It was run by the German Gestapo and commanded by Gestapo official Willy Friedrich, in cooperation with the SP UGB. Members of the Serbian State Guard (Serbo-Croatian: Srpska državna straža; SDS) acted as prison staff. The SDS were the military arm of the collaborationist Government of National Salvation led by Milan Nedić, a pre-war politician who was known to have pro-Axis leanings, who had been selected to lead the puppet government by the Germans. Most of the inmates were individuals affiliated with the Communist Party of Yugoslavia (Serbo-Croatian: Komunistička partija Jugoslavije; KPJ) or participants in that summer's anti-fascist uprising. The majority of prisoners were Serbs. The camp held men and women of all ages, as well as young children. A sizeable number of inmates were Jews and Roma. Rafael Israeli notes that of the 23,637 inmates, 688 were Jews, of whom 382 were killed by the Gestapo in the camp, 186 were transferred to the main Nazi concentration for Serbian Jews at Sajmište, and 103 more were taken from the camp by the Gestapo and killed or used as force labor. The Jewish inmates hailed from Belgrade, Banat, Central Serbia, and various European countries.

Before arriving at the camp, inmates would spend several days in the custody of the Gestapo and SP UGB, where they were tortured and beaten. By the time they were transferred from these detention centers to Banjica, some of the prisoners would already have displayed signs of serious mutilation. Throughout the camp's operation, guards would regularly beat and mistreat prisoners. The camp was notorious for its brutality and executions were frequent and random. Inmates were expected to follow the standard rules of conduct that were implemented in other German camps. These rules prohibited singing, speaking loudly, having conversations on political subjects, possessing writing utensils and paper, and all other personal belongings. The infraction of any of these rules would result in execution. Despite this, imprisoned anti-fascists defied the Germans by singing Partisan songs, shouting their support for Tito and Stalin, and by holding lectures, discussions, one-act plays, recitals, and even folk-song and dance performances on the campgrounds.

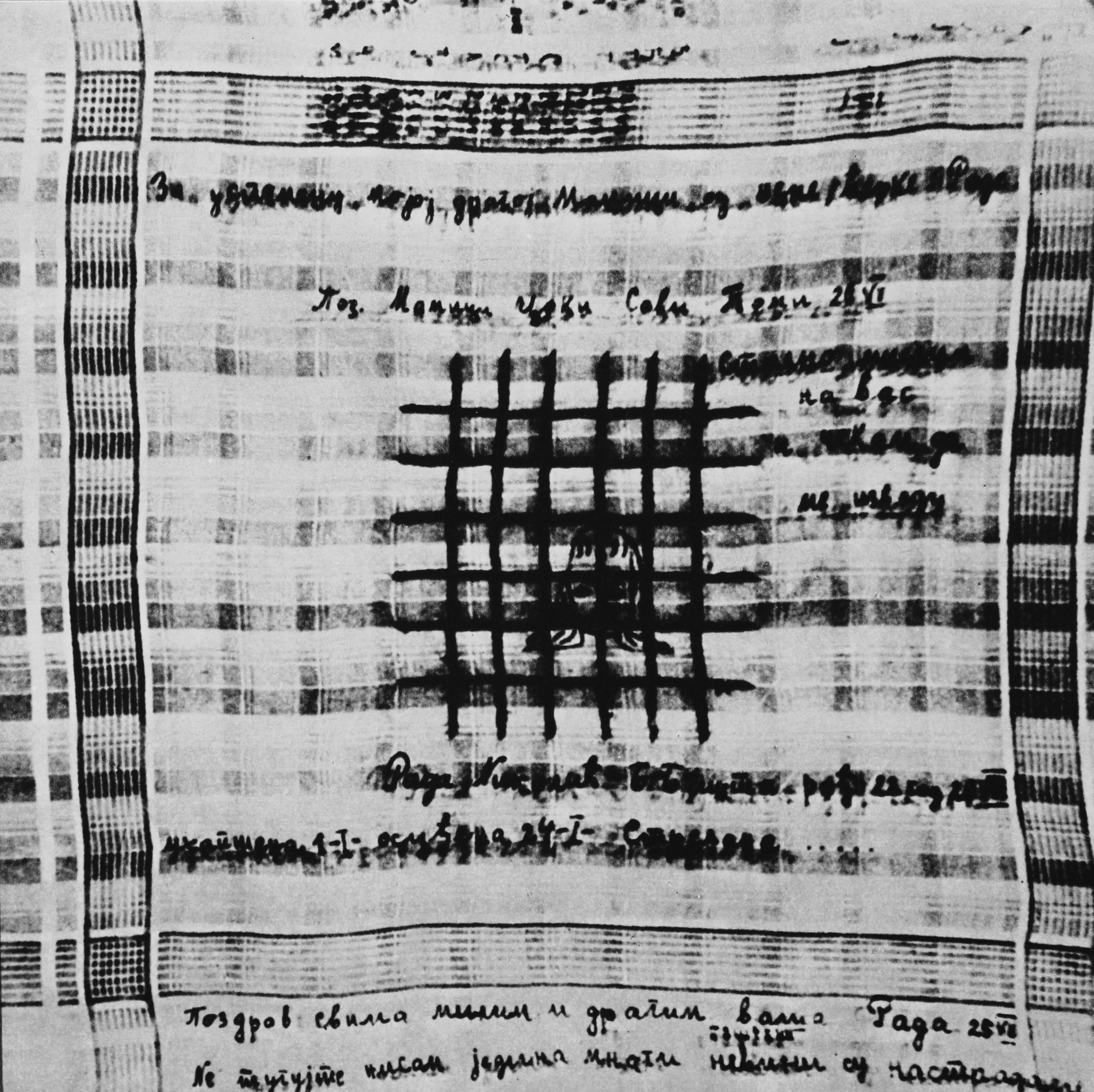
A handkerchief of the Partisan resistance fighter Rada Nikolić, an inmate of Banjica concentration camp. She embroidered the names of her comrades and the dates of their execution into the handkerchief. The only execution date left out is her own - 20 August 1942.

Most of the killings at camp were carried out by the Gestapo. Those committed by the SP UGB and the SDS were carried out under the orders of Belgrade police commissioner Svetozar Vujković, a noted sadist who collaborated enthusiastically with the Germans, interrogated prisoners and devised a number of humiliating torture techniques. Vujković had been a high-ranking official in the pre-war Belgrade police. He was involved in the persecution of Yugoslavia's communists even before the outbreak of World War II. Executions occurred frequently at Vujković's whim and he rarely asked for approval from German or Serbian authorities to carry out murders. He purportedly ordered the killing of prisoners even in cases where the Ministry of Interior decided against execution. Vujković is reported to have begged the Germans to "personally shoot twenty young girls who were ordered for shooting" on one occasion. Despite this, neither he nor any other Serbs holding positions of power in the camp were reprimanded or removed from their posts by the Serbian collaborationist government. When prisoners complained of lack of food, Vujković and his associates replied by saying: "[You] didn't come here for spa therapy and food, but to be executed. To eat more or less will not save your lives." The Belgrade Circuit Court sentenced him to death in November 1949.

The first mass execution in Banjica occurred on 17 December 1941, when 170 prisoners were shot. By the end of 1941 the camp held between 2,000 and 3,000 prisoners. By 1942, most Jews in occupied Serbia were taken to Banjica and shot at Jajinci, Marinkova Bara and the Jewish cemetery. Thousands were killed at those execution sites. According to survivor testimony cited by Cohen, executions were performed by the Belgrade Special Police (SP UGB) and the Serbian State Guard (SDS), including the killing of children. Cohen also cites records indicating that the majority of executions were carried out by the Germans, with the assistance of the SDS. Israeli writes that the Gestapo carried out most executions, assisted by camp administration and other personnel under the authority of the Special Police.

In the spring of 1942 the Germans used a gas van brought from the Sajmište to murder Jewish inmates on two separate occasions. A number of Chetnik guerrillas were imprisoned in the camp that autumn. Executions continued throughout the war, and many inmates were shot as hostages. Cohen writes that between 1942 and September 1944 at least 455 Jews in hiding were captured by Ljotićites, Nedićites and Chetniks, who received rewards for each Jew they found; the captives were transported to Banjica and killed upon arrival.

In late 1944 the Germans forced a chain gang of Yugoslav prisoners to incinerate the remains of those killed in Banjica. A surviving member of the chain gang, Momčilo Damjanović, testified that the incineration of the corpses was organized by a unit of the Kommando 1005, headed by SS-Standartenführer [Colonel] Paul Blobel, the man responsible for erasing traces of German atrocities throughout German-occupied Europe. According to the Encyclopedia of the Holocaust:

In November 1943 SS-Standartenführer Paul Blobel, the officer in charge of Aktion 1005, came to Belgrade in order to set up a unit that would disinter the bodies of the murder victims and burn them. The unit, consisting of fifty members of the Sicherheitspolizei (Security Police) and German military police, as well as 100 Jewish and Serbian prisoners was engaged in its gruesome task of obliterating the traces of the murders up to the fall of 1944.

All Germans left Banjica on October 2. All the camp prisoners of the second and third category were set free on October 3. The last 31 prisoners (the first category) were released on October 4, 1944.

== Legacy ==
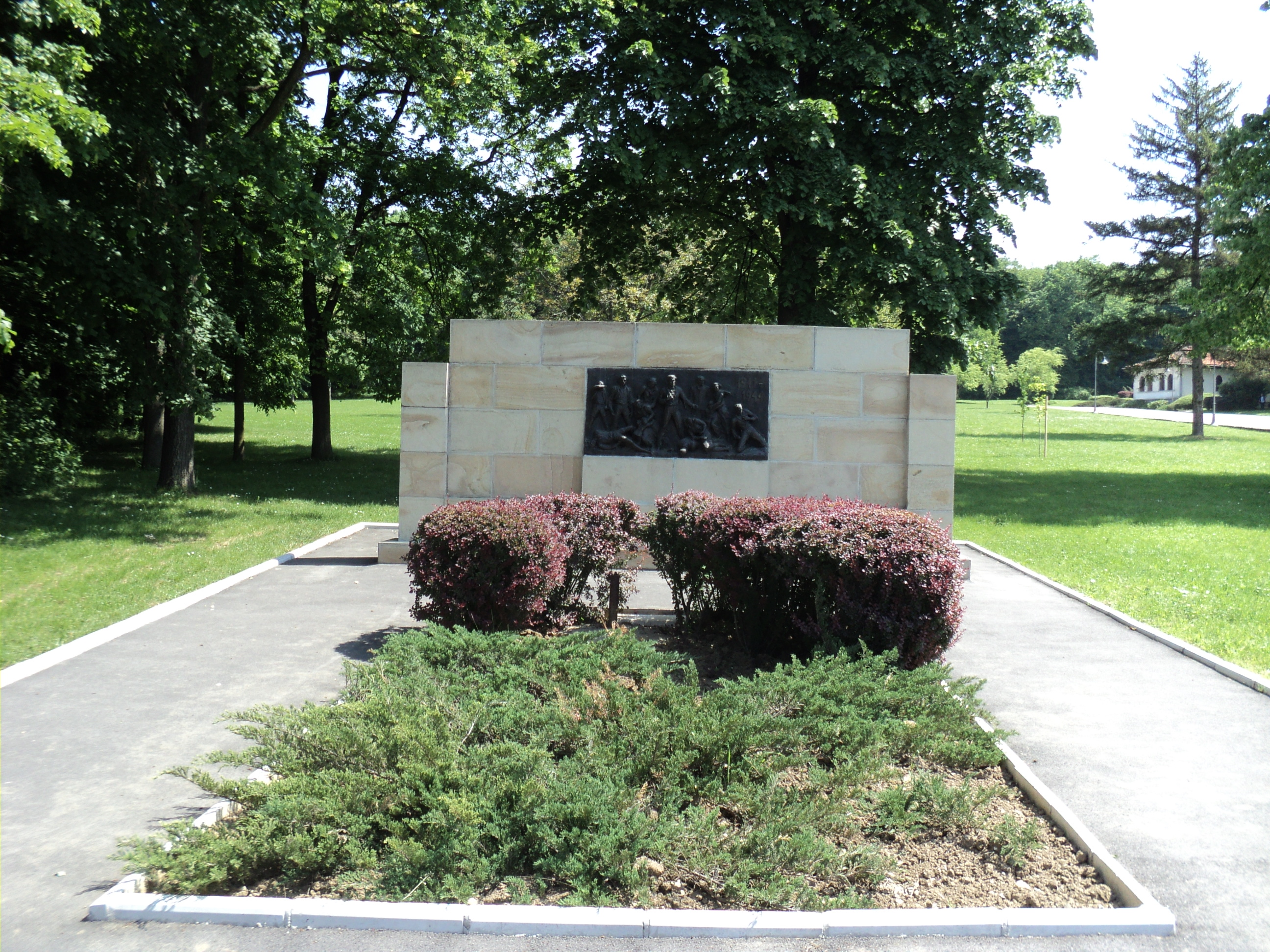
A monument to those executed at the Jajinci firing range

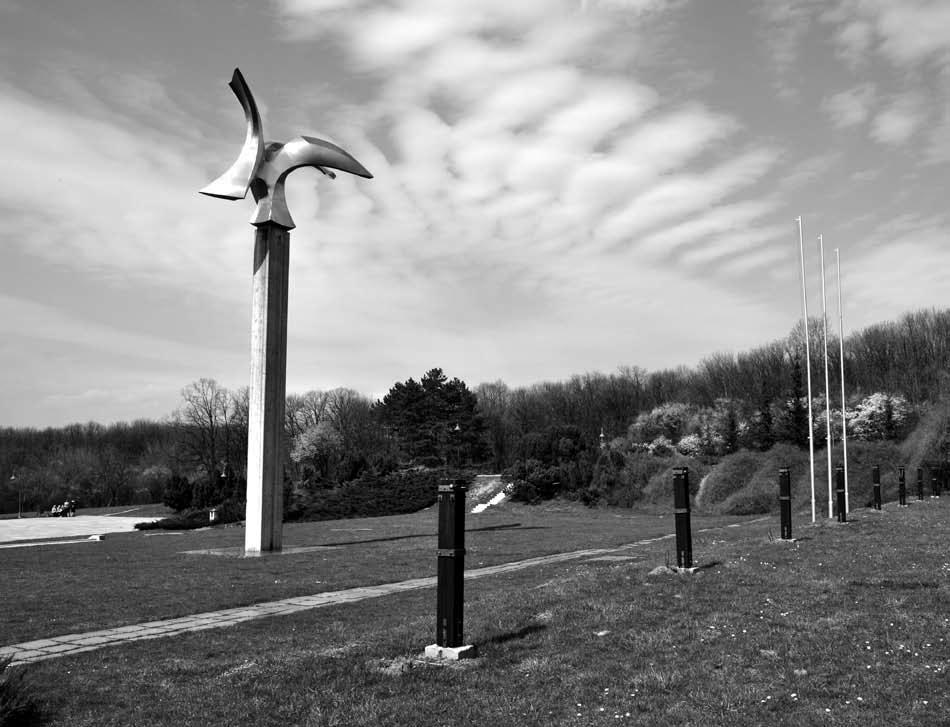
The monument park in Jajinci

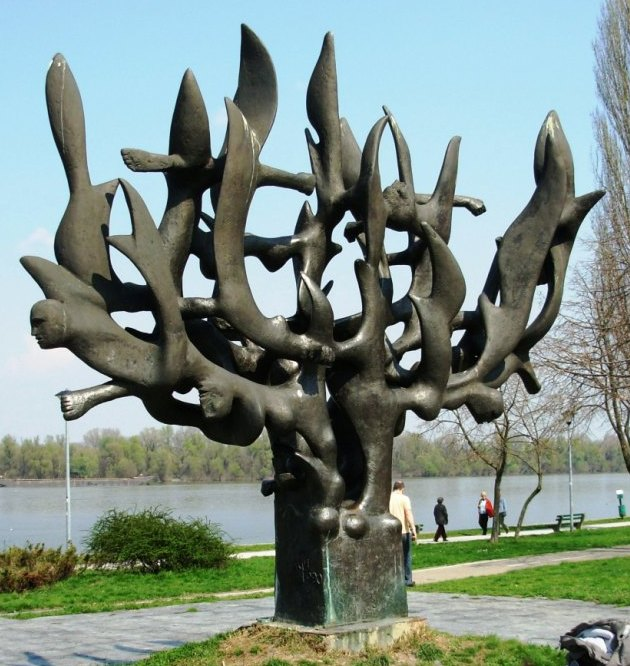
The monument to the Holocaust victims in Belgrade

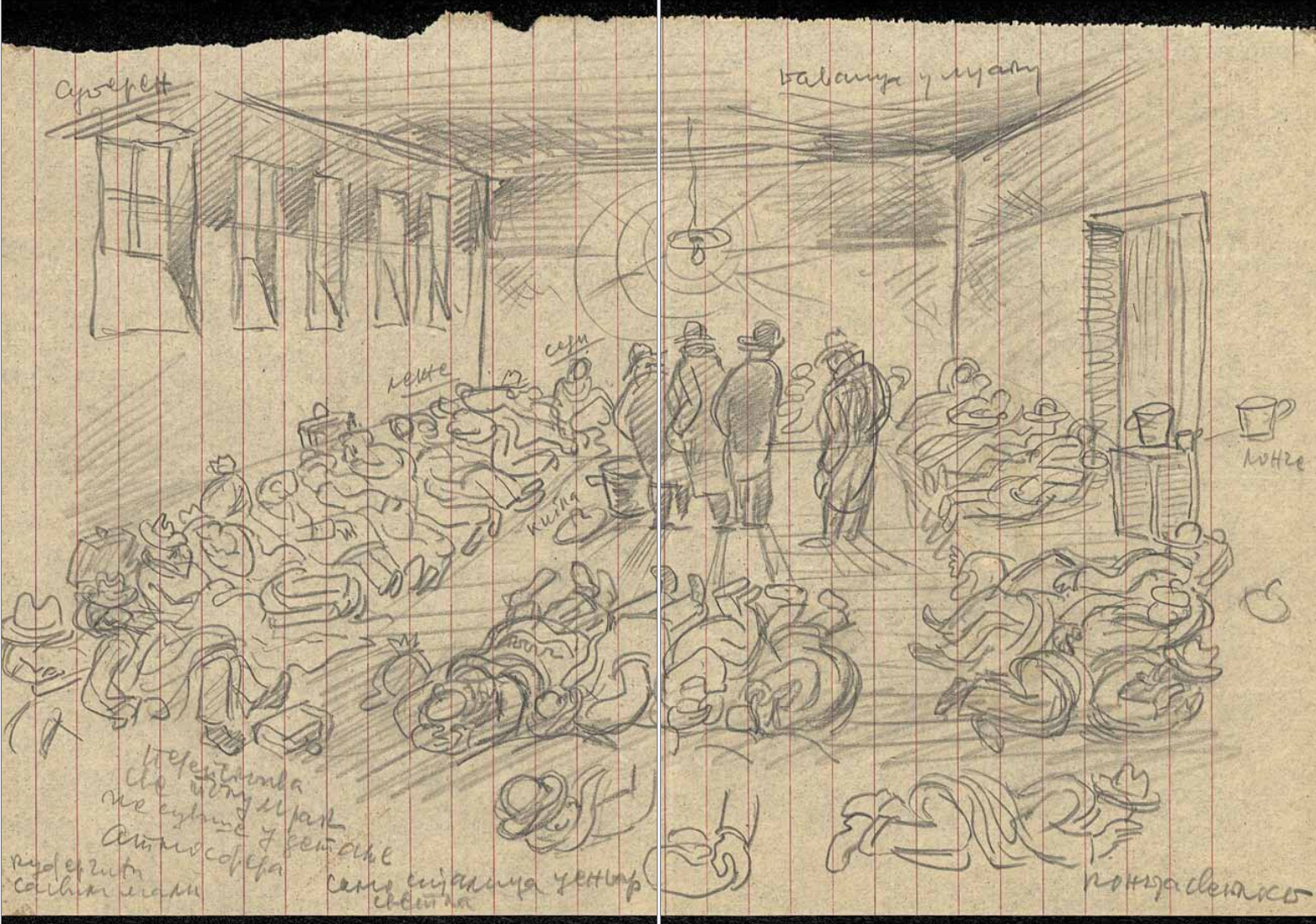
'Sketch for the first night in the Banjica camp' by Aleksandar Deroko

Throughout the war, 23,697 individuals were detained in Banjica, including 688 Jews. At least 3,849 inmates—including a minimum of 382 Jews—died at the camp. Of these, 3,420 were men and 429 were women. Prisoners were mostly Serbian by origin, 73% of them, the others were Jews, Roma, and citizens of Soviet Union and several Western European countries. From the partially preserved archive of the camp which was not destroyed, data for 3,849 executed have been saved. Among them was 3,420 men and 429 women, while by age was 22 children up to 7 years, from 7 to 14 years was 27 children, from 14 to 17 years was 76 persons, from 17 to 21 years was 564 persons, from 21 to 35 years was 1,703 persons, from 35 to 50 was 1,074 persons and over 50 years was 348 persons. Preserved data also show informations about who sent the prisoners to the camp, German SS troops sent 2,392 persons, German army sent 105 persons, Belgrade city administration sent 977 persons, Criminal police sent 93 persons, Serbian military detachments sent 141 persons and Districts of Serbia and Police Headquarters sent 241 persons. Most prisoners were killed by the Germans; according to survivor memoirs cited by Cohen, executions were also carried out by the Serbian State Guard and the Belgrade Special Police. Israeli writes that the Gestapo carried out most executions. 186 Jewish inmates were transferred to Sajmište. Of these, 103 were taken from the camp by the Gestapo, and a small number of those who survived were either sent to forced labor, were transferred to another camp, or were unaccounted for. After the war, Banjica's German commander, Willy Friedrich, was tried by a Yugoslav military court in Belgrade on 27 March 1947, and was sentenced to death. Police Commissioner Vujković survived the war; he was captured and tried for war crimes by Yugoslavia's new communist government. He was eventually found guilty, sentenced to death, and shot.

Historian Jozo Tomasevich calls Banjica the most notorious concentration camp in Serbia during World War II. A small monument dedicated to the victims of the camp exists in Belgrade. The Museum of the Banjica Concentration Camp, first opened in 1969, is dedicated to the memory of those who were detained in the camp and the victims of other Nazi concentration camps. It contains an exhibition of over four hundred items relating to the camp and its operation.

=== Notable prisoners ===
Prominent intellectuals and artists who were imprisoned or killed at Banjica or killed at Jajinci:

- Olga Alkalaj (1907–1942), communist leader,
- Aleksandar Belić (1876–1960), linguist and academic
- Josip "Bepo" Benković, painter (killed 1943)
- Vaso Čubrilović (1897–1990), politician and historian
- Aleksandar Deroko (1894–1988), architect
- Jovan Erdeljanović (1874–1944), ethnologist
- Ivan Đaja, biologist
- Tihomir Đorđević, ethnologist
- Miloš N. Đurić, philologist and philosopher
- Momčilo Gavrić (1906-1993), youngest soldier to serve in the Royal Serbian Army during World War I
- Mihailo Ilić, politicologist (killed 1944)
- Milutin Ivković (1906–1943), footballer and doctor
- Petar Kolendić, literature historian
- Aleksandar Leko, chemist
- Tina Morpurgo (1907–1944), painter, killed by SS
- Viktor Novak (1889–1977), historian and academic
- Vlastimir Pavlović Carevac (1895–1965), composer
- Veljko Petrović, writer
- Milunka Savić (1892–1973), World War I heroine
- Risto Stijović (1894–1974), painter
- Šime Spitzer (1892–1941), Zionist, killed at Banjica
- Nikola Vulić (1872–1945), historian and philologist

=== Museum ===
The Museum of the Banjica Concentration Camp was opened in 1969, and contains more than four hundred items relating to the camp and its operation.

== See also ==
- Trostruki surduk
