= Bežanija =

Bežanija Бежанија
- Urban neighbourhood
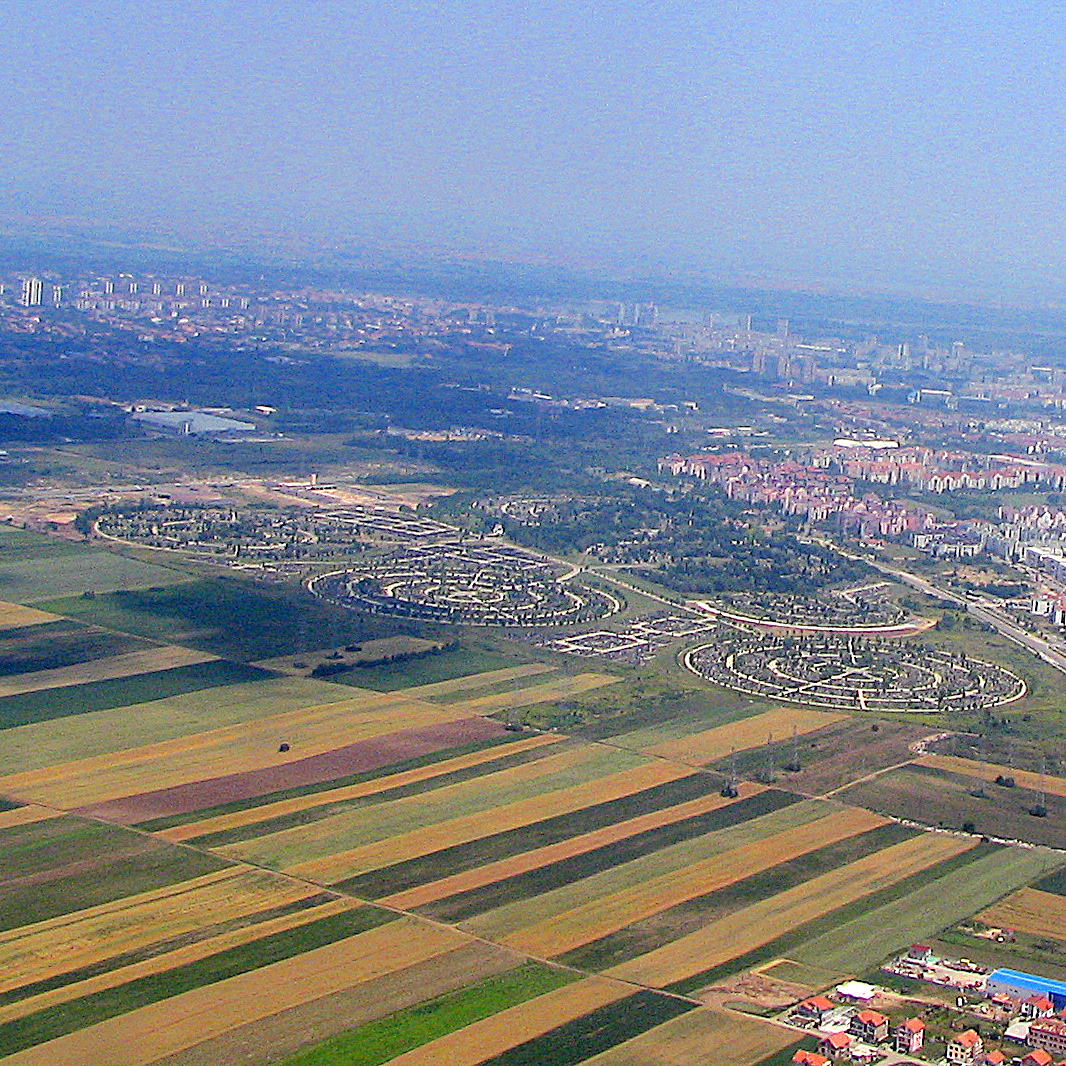
- Bežanija
- Interactive map of Bežanija
- Location within Belgrade
- Coordinates: 44°48′22.37″N 20°22′19.61″E
- Country: Serbia
- Region: Belgrade
- Municipality: New Belgrade

Population (2011)
  - Total: 38,204
- Time zone: UTC+1 (CET)
  - Summer (DST): UTC+2 (CEST)
- Area code: +381(0)11
- Car plates: BG

Bežanija (Serbian Cyrillic: Бежанија, pronounced [bɛʒǎnija]) is an urban neighborhood of Belgrade, Serbia. It is located in Belgrade's municipality of Novi Beograd, in the Syrmia region.

== Location ==
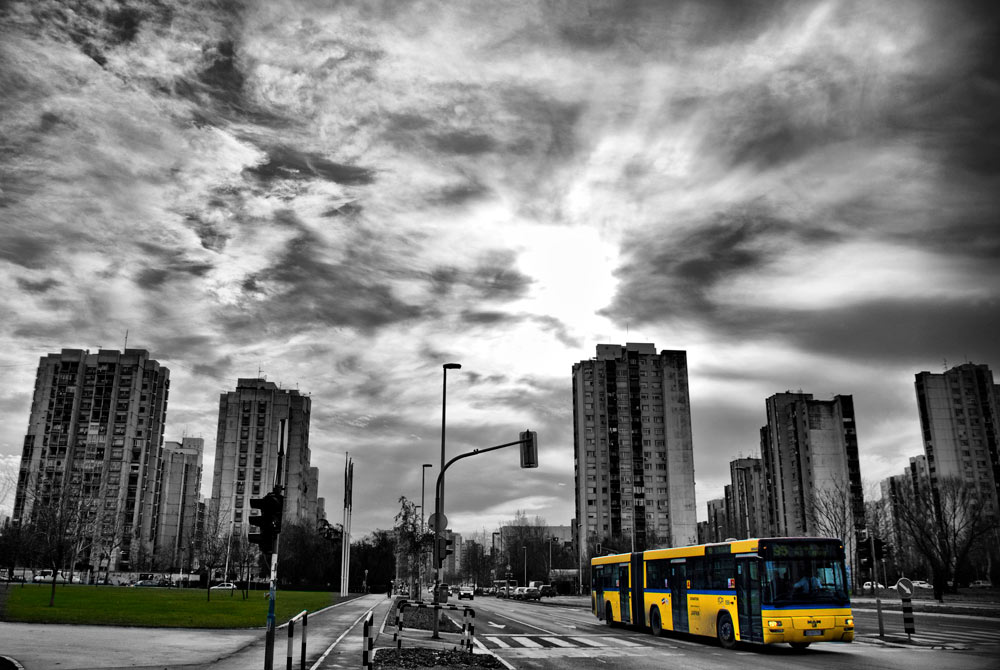
Bežanija blocks

Bežanija is located west of the downtown Belgrade, across the Sava river, in the Syrmia region. It is situated in the central part of the Novi Beograd municipality, on the southern extension of the elongated, crescent-shaped yellow loess ridge of Bežanijska kosa. The ridge (or slope, as it is called in Serbian, kosa) gives its name to the northern extension of Bežanija, Bežanijska Kosa, and stretches to the right banks of the Danube in the neighborhood of Zemun. Once a suburb of Belgrade, separated from it by the vast marshlands on the Sava's left bank, Bežanija today forms one completely urbanized area with Belgrade thanks to the rapid development of Novi Beograd after World War II. Today, Bežanija extends to the northeast into Bežanijska Kosa and the west into Ledine.

== Administration ==
After the World War II ended, Belgrade was divided into raions and Bežanija was part of the Raion X. When this division was abolished in 1952, Bežanija became a municipality. In 1955 it was annexed to the municipality of New Belgrade, but remained as the separate settlement until 1971, when it became a local community (Serbian: mesna zajednica) within Belgrade. In the 1990s, local community was administratively divided into Bežanija and Bežanijska Kosa.

== Population ==
Bežanija experienced a rapid growth of population after 1948 as it was almost immediately attached to the newly constructed city-within-the city of Novi Beograd. As internal communal boundaries changed a lot since the 1970s, despite further expansion, censuses showed a reduced number of population as many border areas (entirely or partially) were detached from Bežanija (Bežanijska Kosa, blocks 61–65, etc.). Historical population of Bežanija (1921–61 as the separate settlement, 1971–81 as a local community, 2002–11 as local communities of Bežanija and Bežanijska kosa):

- 1921 - 2,069
- 1953 - 3,330
- 1961 - 7,129
- 1971 - 15,580
- 1981 - 14,067
- 2002 - 32,416
- 2011 - 38,204

== History ==
Bežanija is the oldest part of today's Novi Beograd, where a settlement existed from the Neolithic to the Roman period.

The remains belonging to the Scordisci, a Celtic tribe which founded Singidunum and Taurunum, the predecessors of Belgrade and Zemun, respectively, were found in Bežanija.

In the book Kruševski pomenik from 1713, which was kept in the Dobrun monastery near Višegrad, settlement of Bežanija was mentioned for the first time under its present name as far as 1512, as a small village with 32 houses, populated by Serbs. In this time, the village was under the administration of the medieval Kingdom of Hungary, and was part of the Syrmia County. The inhabitants of the village crossed the Sava river and settled in Syrmia after fleeing the fall of the medieval Serbian Despotate under the hands of the Ottoman Empire (hence the name bežanija, "refugee camp" in archaic Serbian). Kruševski pomenik was later transferred to the National Library of Serbia and perished during the German bombing of Belgrade on 6 April 1941.

An old German map of the Syrmia, shows a village south of Zemun called Verschania. In 1521, the village became part of the Ottoman Empire. From 1527 to 1530, Bežanija was part of Radoslav Čelnik's Duchy of Syrmia, an Ottoman vassal, until its subsequent organization into the Ottoman Sanjak of Syrmia. The Habsburg monarchy conquered it temporarily during the Great Turkish War (1689–1691), but it remained under Ottoman administration by the provisions of the Treaty of Karlowitz in 1699, until 1718. In 1718, the village became part of the Habsburg monarchy and was placed under military administration. It was part of the Habsburg Military Frontier (Petrovaradin regiment of Slavonian Krajina). During the 17th and 18th centuries, hunger and constant Turkish intrusions devastated the village, but it was constantly being repopulated by the refugees from central Serbia. In 1810, population census counted 115, mostly Serbian households. By the 1850s, Austrians colonized a large number of Germans in Bežanija. In 1848-1849 it was part of the Serbian Vojvodina, an ethnic Serb autonomous region within the Austrian Empire, but in 1849 was again placed under administration of the Military Frontier.

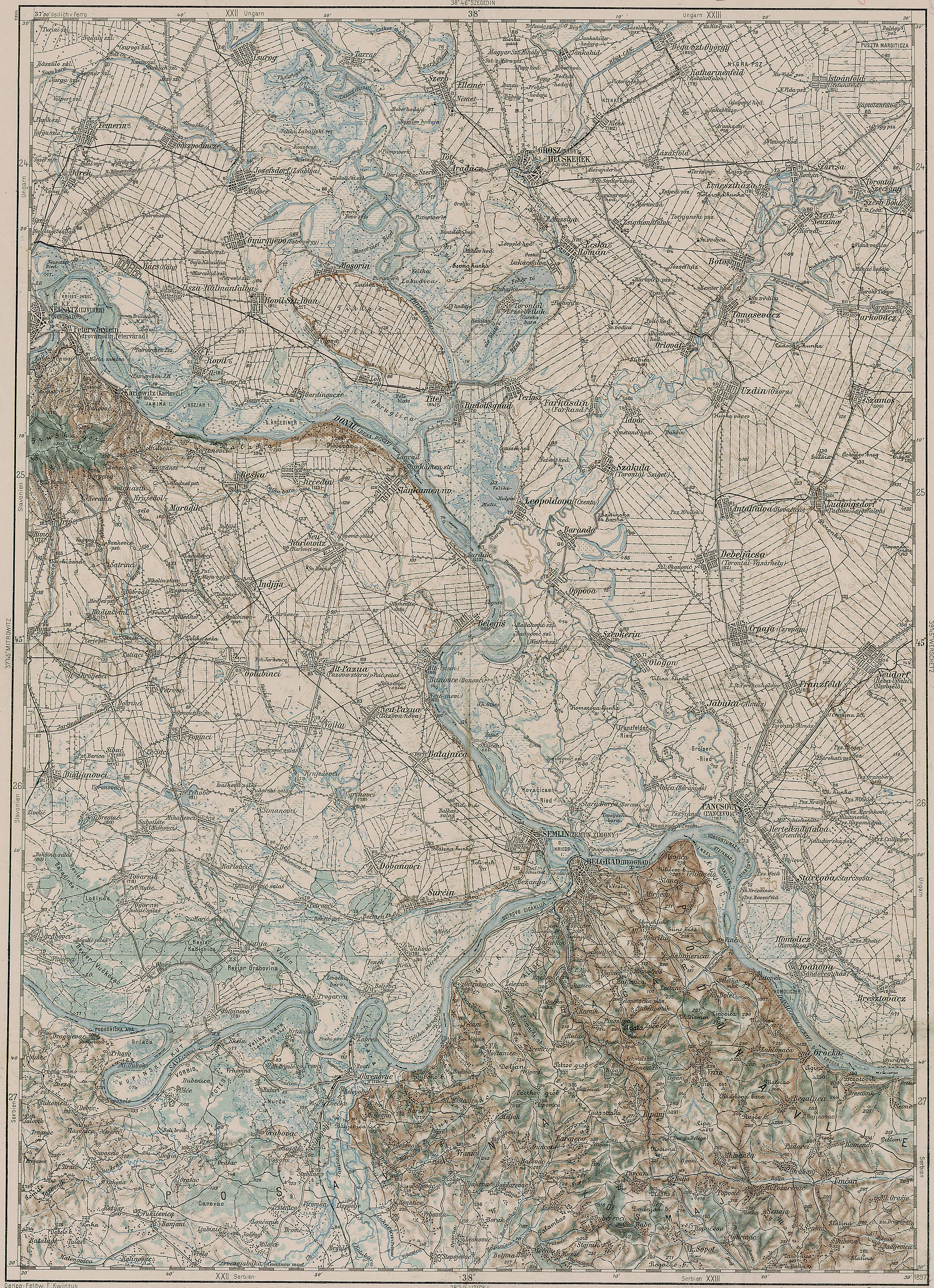
Old map from 1910, showing settlements in eastern Syrmia, including Bežanija

As the Frontier was abolished in 1881–1882, it became part of the Syrmia County within the autonomous Habsburg kingdom Croatia-Slavonia, which was located within the Hungarian part of the Dual Monarchy of Austria-Hungary. In 1910, the largest ethnic group in the village were Serbs, while other sizable ethnic groups were Germans, Hungarians and Croats. During the heavy shelling of Belgrade in 1914 after Austria-Hungary declared war on Serbia, Austro-Hungarian army bombarded Belgrade from artillery positions in Bežanija.

After dissolution of Austria-Hungary, in autumn of 1918, Bežanija became part of the newly formed State of Slovenes, Croats and Serbs. On November 24, 1918, as part of Syrmia region, the village became part of the Kingdom of Serbia, and on December 1, it became part of the newly formed Kingdom of Serbs, Croats and Slovenes (future Yugoslavia).

From 1918 to 1922, the village was part of the Syrmia County and from 1922 to 1929 part of the Syrmia Oblast. Bežanija became part of the wider Belgrade area for the first time in 1929 after coup d'état conducted by the king Alexander I of Yugoslavia, who, among other things, draw a new map of Yugoslavia's administrative division creating a new administrative unit Uprava grada Beograda or Administration of the City of Belgrade which comprised Belgrade, Zemun (with Bežanija) and Pančevo. Administrative area of the village of Bežanija was quite large at the time, stretching to the King Alexander Bridge, which was a dividing point between Bežanija and Zemun. It means it encompassed of what would be 2/3 of the area of modern New Belgrade.

During World War II, from 1941 to 1944, the village was occupied by the Axis powers and was attached to the Pavelić's Independent State of Croatia. After World War II, Bežanija became part of new socialist Serbia within restored Yugoslavia. It remained part of the Belgrade area but with its own municipality. As the construction of Novi Beograd began in 1948, municipality of Bežanija was abolished an annexed to the municipality of Novi Beograd in 1955 (itself established in 1952), becoming one of its local communities.

== Economy ==
Bežanija is mostly residential area. Some very important industrial facilities are located in the areas geographically, though not administratively, parts of Bežanija: IMT and FOM factories, section of the Belgrade's Waterwoks and Sewage, Minel, etc. Commercial sector is developing recently, including a green market, several gas pumps, a stadium and several shopping malls (like Immo Idea).

The major transmission grid's substation for western Belgrade is located in Bežanija and was heavily damaged during the NATO bombing of Serbia in 1999. The graphite bombs (or blackout bombs) were used. The major substation for eastern Belgrade, in Leštane was also bombed.

In August 2021, city announced that Bežanija will be one of the termini of the second line of the planned subway system. Construction of the terminus in Bežanija was scheduled for 2023, and completion of the route, which will connect it to Mirijevo on the eastern outskirts of the city, is planned for 2030.

In 2022, construction of the Bežanija reservoir was underway. Part of the Belgrade waterworks system, the reservoir will be the largest basin of drinking water in Southeast Europe.

== Features ==
=== Cemeteries ===
New Bežanija Cemetery

New Bežanija Cemetery (Novo Bežanijsko groblje), west of the settlement, is Belgrade's largest cemetery, covering an area of 94 ha (230 acres). It was open in 1974 and was conceived as the main cemetery for the Syrmian part of urban Belgrade (Zemun and New Belgrade). The project was designed in the Urbanism and Planning Institute Belgrade, and the main architect was Slobodanka Prekajski. Construction of the Church of Thomas the Apostle began in 2001. It was finished and consecrated on 19 October 2003, on the Saint Thomas the Apostle day.

Old Bežanija Cemetery

Old cemetery, much smaller than the new one, is located in the old part of the settlement. Adjacent to it, in the locality Belanović Hole (Belanovića rupa), there is a memorial cemetery, dedicated to the World War II victims. Some 8,000 both civilian and military victims were buried here.

Pet Cemetery

First plans for the pet cemetery were made in 1996. In January 2019 it was announced that the forested area in Block 51, south of the Belgrade-Novi Sad highway, is chosen as the location of the first Belgrade's pet cemetery. The cemetery will cover an area of 1.51 ha (3.7 acres), 70% of which will be green areas. The entire complex will be bordered with the protective green belt, 15 m (49 ft) wide. The complex will consist of several areas: open area (800 burial places), forested cemetery (900), columbarium and rosarium (1,100), communal cemetery (1,400) and memorial park for the animals from the Belgrade Zoo. In the best case scenario, the construction was not to start before 2020. In February 2020, city administration announced works for November 2020. The complex will also include administrative building, veterinary clinic and incinerator.

Works began in March 2021, but with somewhat changed number of burial lots. Deadline was set for the end of 2023 summer. By 2023, residents living in the neighborhood began organizing protests against the animal crematorium in their vicinity, especially after it was leaked that the incinerator will be used for destruction of the medical waste, too. They also organized a petition against it, collecting over 4,000 signatures.

The works were finished in late September 2023, with somewhat enlarged number of lots in open spaces (839), but reduced number in the forest (730). In the end, the crematorium was not built and the animals will be cremated at the Lešće cemetery. Mayor Aleksandar Šapić said that city need another pet cemetery which will be built in the opposite side of the city.

=== Dojno Polje Airport ===
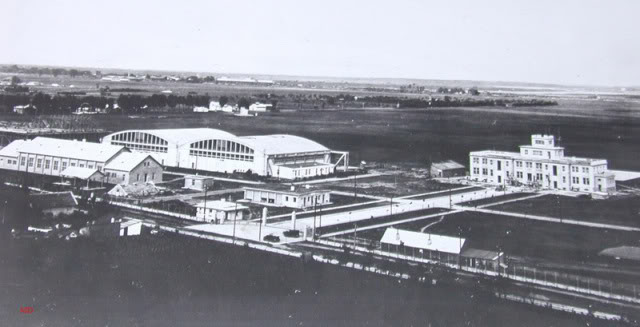
Dojno Polje Airport in 1931

West of Bežanija and 2 km (1.2 mi) south of Zemun, between the village and the Sava river, is the location of the old Belgrade airport which was finished in March 1927. The locality was called Dojno Polje. Construction of an airfield began in 1923. An initiative asked for the creation of the airline company in 1926 which was approved by the government on 23 March 1926. Then the initial public offering began but largely failed as only 10% of the planned amount was gathered. According to the existing laws, the airline company was to be closed even before it was officially formed. In order to bust the sale of the shares, pilot Tadija Sondermajer decided to conduct the promotional flight Paris-Bombay-Belgrade. With his colleague Leonid Bajdak, he started the journey on 20 April 1927 from Paris, arriving back to Belgrade after 11 days and 14.800 km (9.196 mi), on 8 May. They were awaited as heroes by the crowd of 30,000. The sale of the shares was boosted and in three months there were sufficient funds for the company, named Aeroput and established on 17 June 1927, to purchase its first 4 airplanes.

New administrative building was constructed in 1931 and to celebrate the occasion, a big air show of the biplanes was held. Around the airport, a workers settlement developed. The airport was destroyed by the Germans in 1944, and became defunct in 1962 when the new airport near the village of Surčin was finished (today's Belgrade Nikola Tesla Airport). In 1960, 500 m^{2} (5,400 sq ft) of the former officer's club were adapted for the first permanent location of the future military aeronautical museum. First exhibition was held in 1961 and the permanent setup was organized in 1965. It was then decided that the museum would also host civilian aircraft. Civilian wing was established and by 1966 already held some 30 planes and the expansion became necessary. Air force then swapped the former airport complex for the apartments for its members throughout massively constructed New Belgrade. It was suggested that museum should remain, with added parcel of 2.6 ha (6.4 acres) around it, but this was still not enough for all the hangars needed for the exhibitions. The idea was abandoned and the exhibition moved to Zemun in 1967 before it was decided that the Aeronautical Museum Belgrade will be built near Surčin.

In April 2016 works began on the construction of the access road to the Ada Bridge. During works on the new boulevard, remnants of the old airport's runway, hangars and warehouses were discovered. The area is today occupied by the modern commercial and business neighborhood of Airport City Belgrade, named so after the old airport.

=== Cultural monuments ===
The Old Elementary School, at 68 Vojvođanska Street, was built in 1891. It was a standard object of its kind, designed by the subdued postulates of the Academism. As the representative of the continual development of education in the 19th century, but also of the economic status and economy in general among the Serbian population of this area, it was declared a cultural monument in January 2019. It is also the oldest preserved building on the territory of the New Belgrade municipality.

=== Sport ===
Bežanija has many Sports facilities including tennis courts, basketball courts and the Stadion Bežanije, where FK Bežanija play their home matches. FK Bežanija was founded in 1921.

== Sub-neighborhoods ==
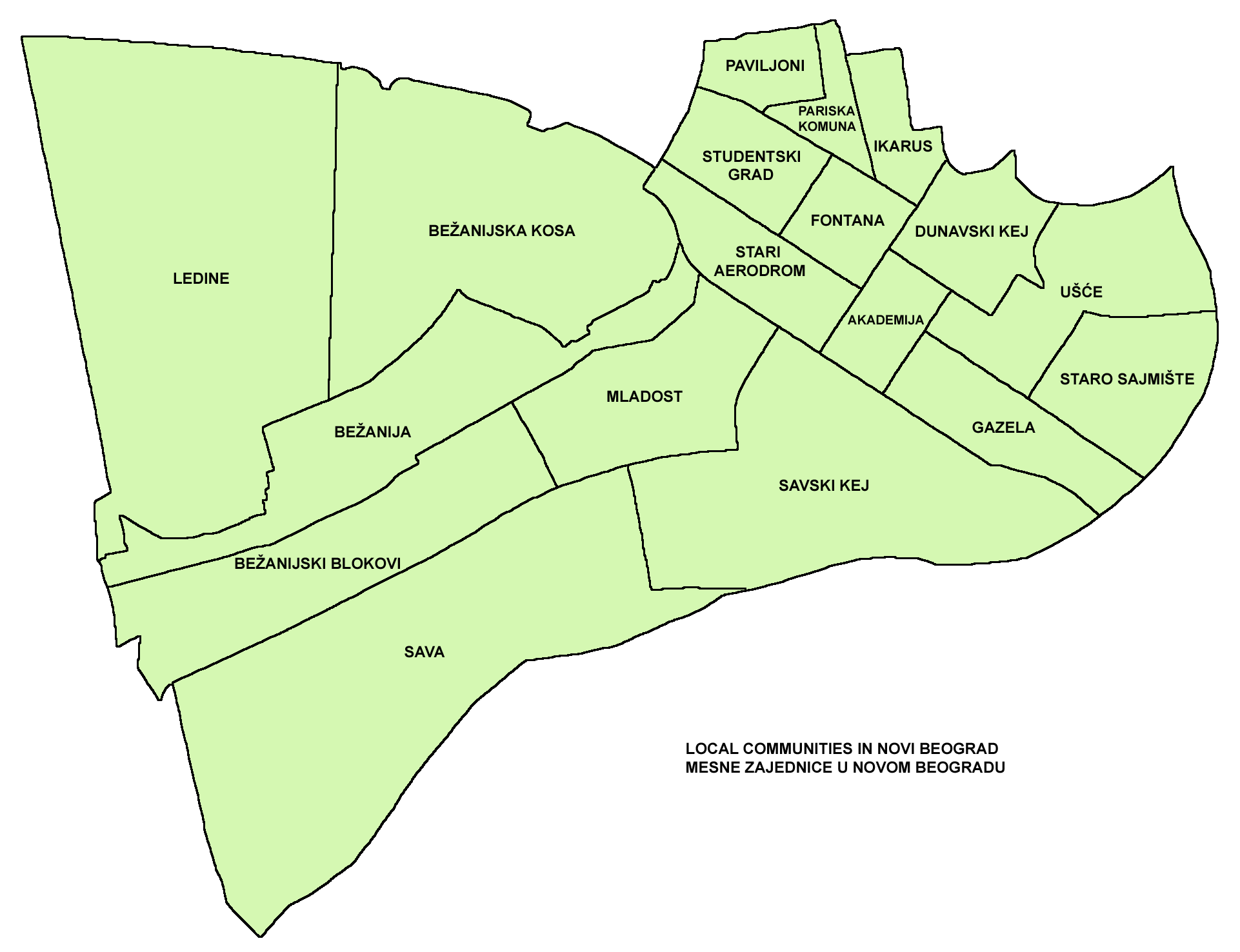
Map of Local communities in Novi Beograd

=== Stara Bežanija ===
Stara Bežanija (Serbian Cyrillic: Стара Бежанија, lit. 'Old Bežanija'), as the name says, is the oldest section of Bežanija, location of the original village. It had a population of 13,378 in 2002 and 8,412 in 2011.

At the roundabout on the corner of Vojvođanska, Vinogradska, Surčinska and Dr Ivana Ribara streets, an obelisk was erected in 2012 to celebrate the 500 years of the first mention of Bežanija. It is 5 m (16 ft), or 500 cm (200 in) tall, one centimeter for each year. On 31 March 2021 construction of the 7.9 km (4.9 mi) long, New Belgrade's direct connection to the Obrenovac-Surčin Bridge and Miloš the Great Motorway began. It starts from the roundabout. Originally planned to be finished in September 2022, the road was opened on 1 April 2023.

=== Bežanijska Kosa ===
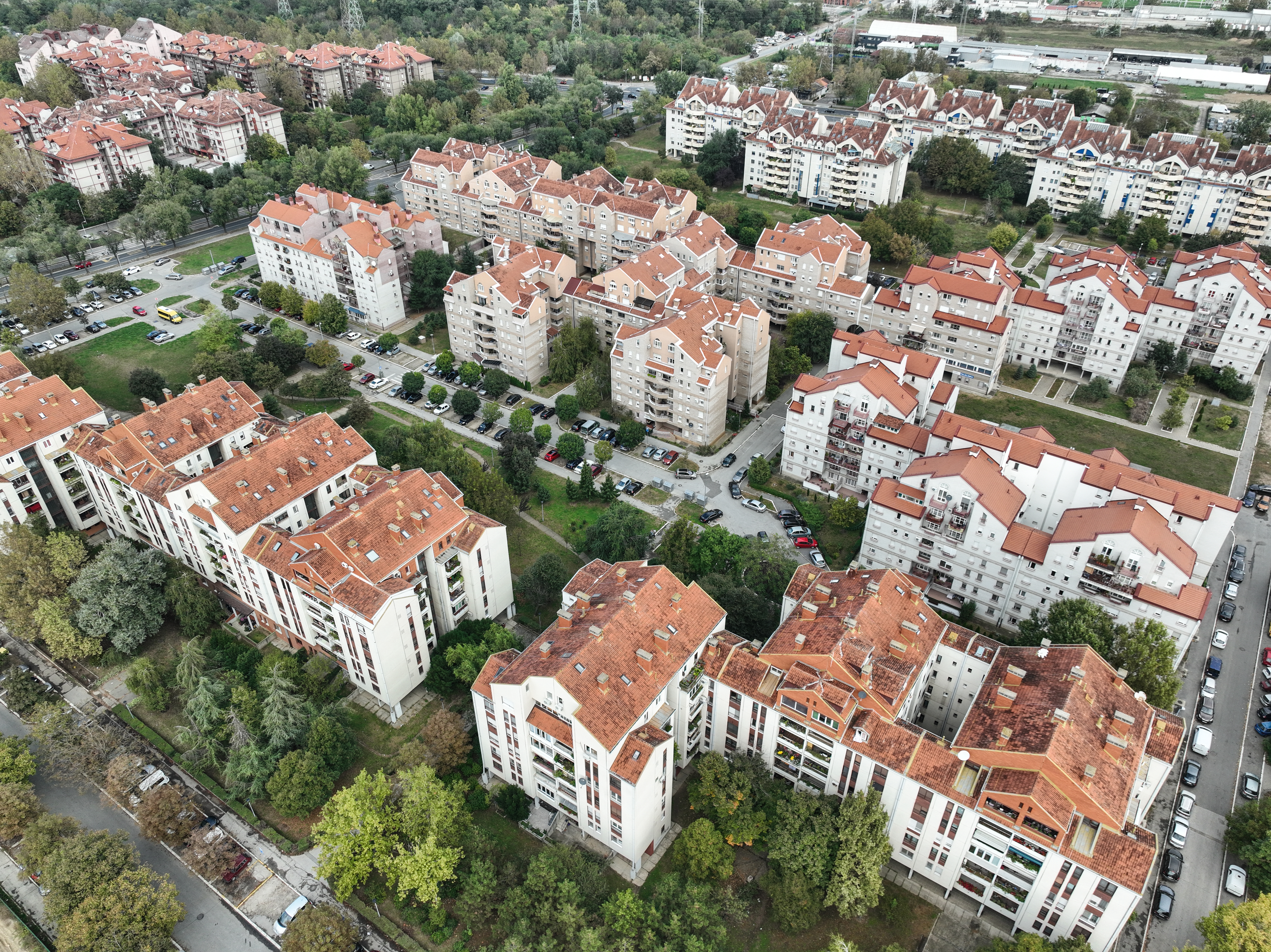
Bežanijska Kosa

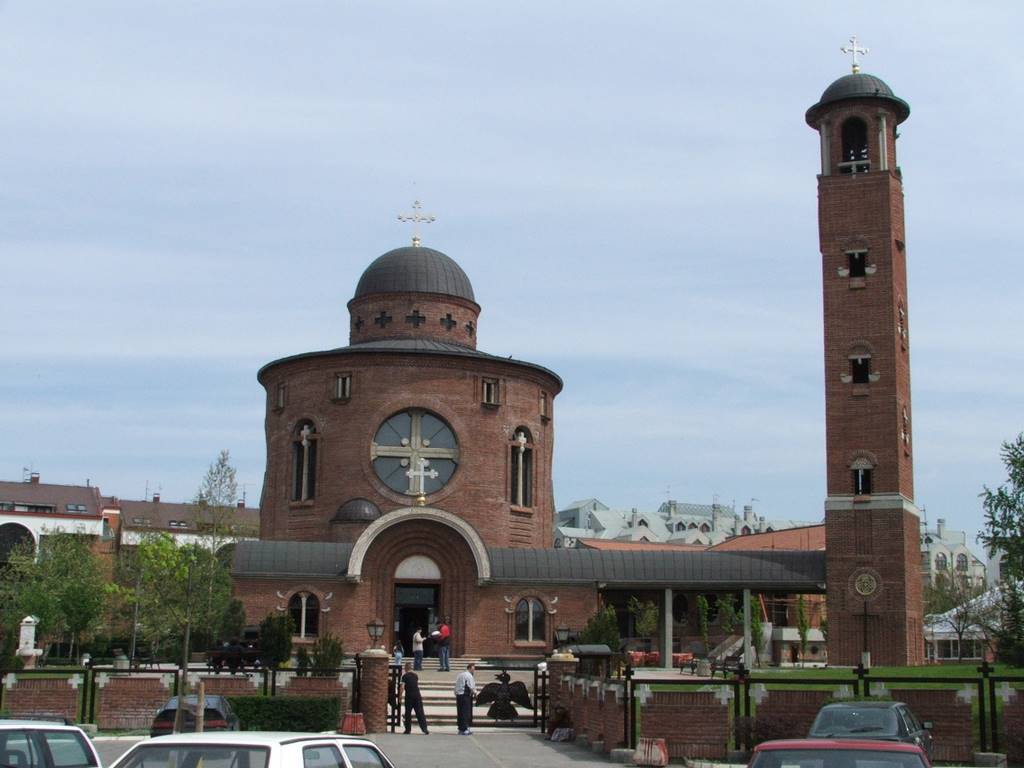
Orthodox Church of Saint Vasilije Ostroški in Bežanijska Kosa

Northeastern extension of the Bežanija, along the loess ridge, is called Bežanijska Kosa (Serbian Cyrillic: Бежанијска Коса, lit. 'Slope of Bežanija'). It is crescent shaped, leaning on the western border of the urban area of Novi Beograd, stretching along the Tošin Bunar street to Zemun. Northern section of the neighborhood is crossed by the Belgrade-Zagreb highway.

In 1883 Austrian general Laudon built a trench through the loess to make way for the railway, thus creating an artificial hill, known today as Bežanijska Kosa. Laudon's trench, whose remnants still can be seen but are turned into an informal settlement, marked to border between the south Kalvarija and north Bežanijska Kosa.

Modern neighborhood was built in 1987. It roughly comprises Blocks 6, 35, 49, 50 and 60. Southern section is industrialized (IMT and Minel factories) and the location of the old airport (now a new neighborhood in the process of construction, Airport City Belgrade), while the central parts are mostly residential. Northern section, along the highway, comprises stadiums of the Bežanija and Radnički soccer clubs, auto-camp, hotel Nacional, sports center of 11 April, Bežanija retirement home and one of the major Belgrade hospitals, KBC Bežanijska Kosa. In the northeast it borders the Studentski Grad while northwestern section belongs to the municipality of Zemun. The railway tunnel has been dug through the loess ridge.

The Bežanijska Kosa Forest, which encircles the hospital, in the Zemun's section of the neighborhood, covers 26.06 hectares (64.4 acres). Behind the neighborhood are green areas where complex of Belgrade's public greenery company is located. It includes the nursery gardens. A green waste treatment facility "Biobaza" is also within the complex. It treats 15,000 m^{3} (530,000 cu ft) of plant waste yearly: two thirds are prepared into the heating material for the nurseries, while the rest is treated into the compost for the public green areas.

In February 2021, jackals were spotted in the neighborhood. Their number is constantly growing in the vicinity of Belgrade since the 2010s, and Bežanijska Kosa is on the outskirts of the city hence easily accessible to wild animals.

It distinguishes itself from the rest of Novi Beograd as it has no skyscrapers, but smaller, more 'humane' buildings. It had a population of 19,036 in 2002 and 29,792 in 2011.

In May 2022, city announced plans to build a complex of skyscrapers along the motorway, next to the FK BUSK football stadium. Two buildings would measure 100 metres (330 ft), while the third would reach 120 metres (390 ft). All three would have the conjoined base and communal, underground garage. The investor claimed they have accepted almost all of over a hundred complaints from the local residents. However, the citizens organized in civil initiative "Bežanija stays, Kosa defies", and rejected such "megalomaniacal complex" in the mostly family oriented neighborhood. Also, from the early draft to the announced one, city doubled the area covered by the complex from 80,000 square metres (860,000 sq ft) to 163,595 square metres (1,760,920 sq ft), which means some of the family villas and houses in the vicinity will have to be demolished. Also, plan hasn't envisioned almost any greenery. The "Bureau Cube Partners", which designed the complex, dismissed the complaints, saying that residents got everything wrong. Citizens responded that the presented data are false, tailored for the area 50% smaller than the planned one, so that the infrastructure appears adequate. City accepted to correct the plan, but the protests continued.

The projected Tempo Tower complex would cover 5.36 hectares (13.2 acres). Over 2,200 residents joined the initiative, and organized petitions and public protests. The movement is part of the larger and growing opposition to such complexes all over the town. Real estates are not purchased to be an actual living or working space, so a very small number of residents live in such buildings, creating a "ghost town" feel ("only every tenth window is lit, only on every thirtieth someone actually appears on the terrace".

Envisioned by the former plan and reconfirmed in March 2023, it was announced that the existing FK BUSK stadium will be upgraded into the Center for Sports and Recreation for the students at the University of Belgrade. The present earthen stadium has few additional courts for tennis and basketball. The complex will cover 10 hectares (25 acres). The completely new stadium will be built with 1,600 seats, by the guidelines of the UEFA. Five additional structures will be constructed, hosting main hall, conference center, training hall, dormitories, basketball court, four tennis courts, 500 parking spots and five trim trails. Construction of the first structure, National training volleyball center, began on 6 June 2023 and should be finished in 2025.

=== Bežanijski Blokovi ===
Not considered part of the modern Bežanija, but rather as a separate neighborhood of Blokovi.
