= Svetozar Vujković =

- Светозар Вујковић
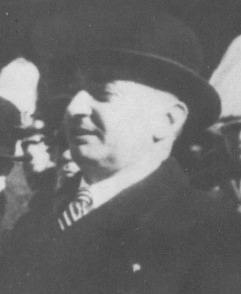
- Svetozar Vujković in 1942
- Born: 1899; Smederevska Palanka, Kingdom of Serbia
- Died: 1949 (aged 49–50); Belgrade, PR Serbia, FPR Yugoslavia
- Occupation: police official
- Organization: Government of National Salvation
- Known for: being commander of Banjica concentration camp
- Status: executed
- Allegiance: Nazi Germany
- Criminal charges: treason, war crimes
- Penalty: death

Svetozar Vujković (Serbian Cyrillic: Светозар Вујковић; 1899–1949) was a Serbian police officer who commanded the Banjica concentration camp during World War II. He was a high-ranking official in the pre-war Belgrade police and was involved in the persecution of communists in Yugoslavia during the interwar period.

Vujković collaborated enthusiastically with the Gestapo following the Axis invasion of Yugoslavia. He was made Special Police commander at Banjica on 5 August 1941 and was later the victim of a failed assassination attempt by Serbian anti-fascists. As the commander at Banjica, he ordered murders and devised torture techniques. Execution lists were drawn up by him beginning in 1942. Vujković often selected victims, including children, at random, and had murders carried out by members of the Belgrade Special Police and the Serbian State Guard. When prisoners in Banjica complained of lack of food, Vujković and his associates often replied by saying: "[You] didn't come here for spa therapy and food, but to be executed. To eat more or less will not save your lives."

Vujković was captured by the Anglo-American forces and extradited to Yugoslavia at the end of the war. In July 1949, he testified before the Yugoslav State Commission and explained that Serbian collaborationist forces saved countless Serb civilians from being executed as German hostages by swapping them with Roma prisoners. He was executed in 1949.
