= Yuri Gagarin Street, Belgrade =

Street in Belgrade, Serbia

Yuri Gagarin Street
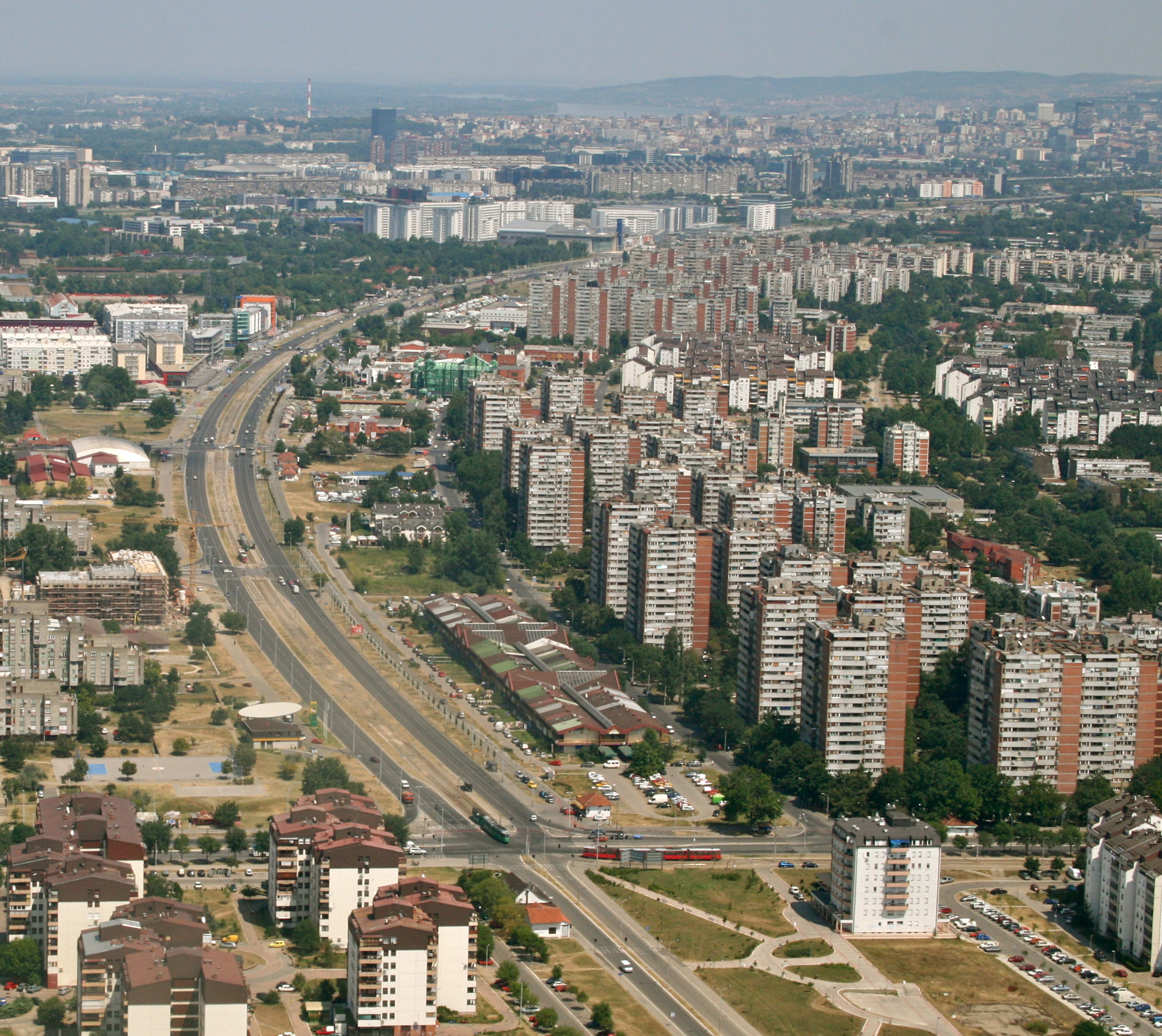
- Aerial view on Yuri Gagarin Street

- Location within Belgrade
- Native name: Улица Јурија Гагарина (Serbian)
- Namesake: Yuri Gagarin
- Length: 4,600 m (15,100 ft)
- Width: more than 50 m
- Location: New Belgrade, Belgrade
- Coordinates: 44.8010°N 20.3723°E

Construction
- Inauguration: Early 1970-s

Yuri Gagarin Street (Serbian: Улица Јурија Гагарина / Ulica Jurija Gagarina) is a major street in New Belgrade, named after Soviet cosmonaut Yuri Gagarin, the first man in space.

The Jurija Gagarina serves as an informal boundary of the north and south Blokovi neighbourhoods of New Belgrade.

== Notable features ==
- Delta City, shopping-mall in Block 67
- ENJUB Center, in Block 45
- "20. oktobar", school in Block 70
- Elementary school "Užička republika", in Block 62
- Elementary school "Branko Radičević", in Block 45
- Pijaca (greenmarket), in Block 44
- Piramida (the Pyramide), shopping center in Block 44
- "Chinese center (kineski centar)/Blok 70 center", shopping center in Block 70

In May 2022, city administration announced construction of the large Chinese shopping mall in Block 72. Company "Eurasia Trade Center" purchased two lots (total of 2.75 hectares (6.8 acres)) for 821.2 million dinars (€7 million). It should replace the old Chinese center in Block 70, which was partially damaged in fire in August 2021. The location, in the extension of the Yuri Gagarin Street was originally proposed as the location of the city's new Buvljak (flea market) in 2017. The project includes construction of the extension of the Yuri Gagarin Street.

=== Yuri Gagarin Monument ===
In 2017 city administration decided to erect a monument to Gagarin somewhere along the street. On 5 April 2018, without any announcement, a monument appeared close to the shopping center Piramida, with the future date written on it (12 April, day of Gagarin's flight). The monument consisted of the 2.6-metre-tall (9 ft) granite plated pedestal and a disproportionally small head of Gagarin in the helmet. The public reaction was overwhelmingly negative and was followed by the uproar in social media and reports in the international news. The Russian ambassador also reacted. Additionally, it turned out that the head is not a work of some sculptor but was produced by some company which sold this same head to several other cities around the world, but there they were placed on the proportional pedestals. On 10 April the head was removed and the demolition of the pedestal began a day later. City ordered the removal of the monument, claiming that they were not informed nor consulted about it and that the proper monument to Gagarin will be built. Local municipality New Belgrade also claimed they knew nothing about it.

== Buvljak ==
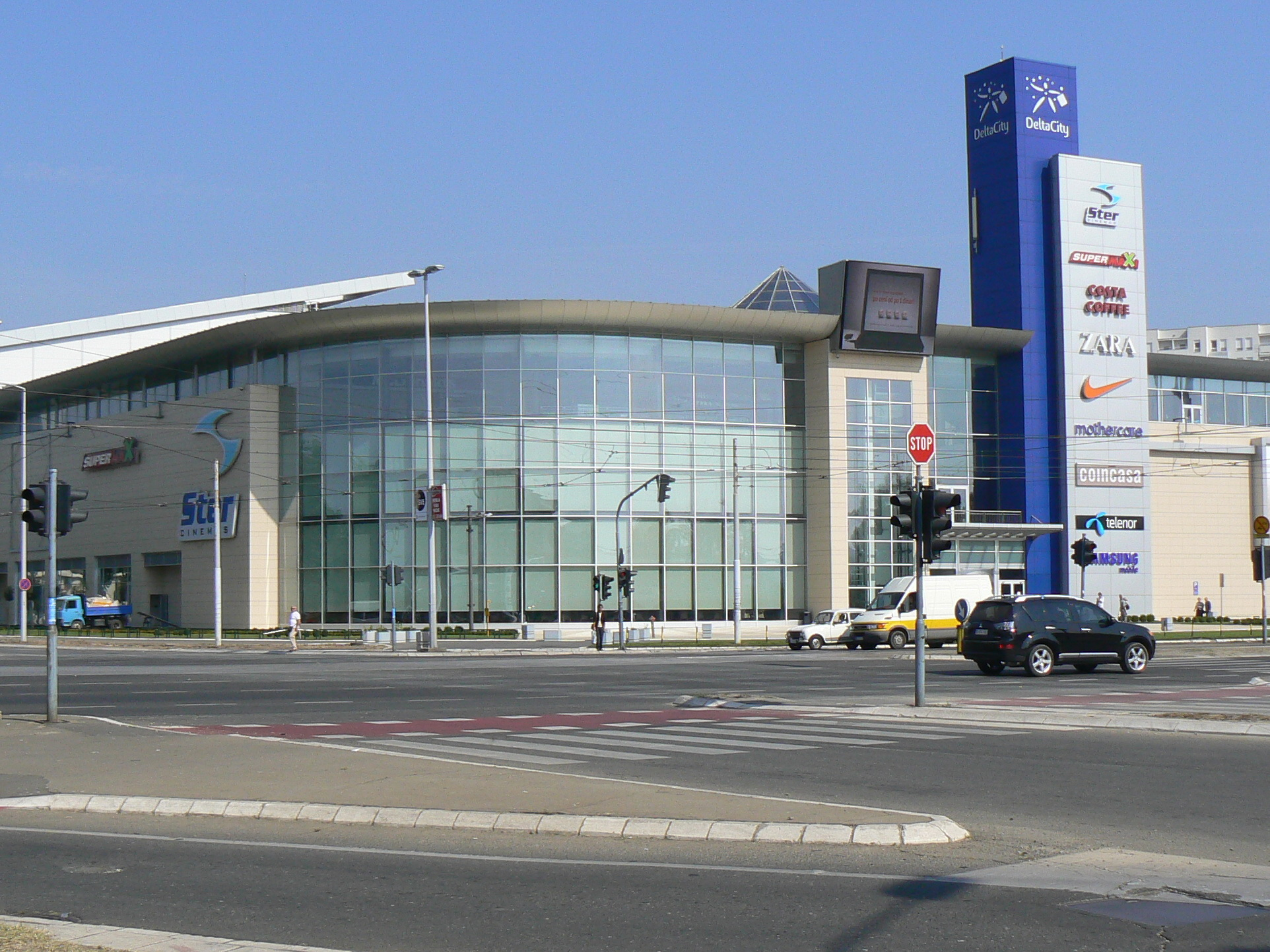
Delta City

Buvljak, Belgrade's largest flea market is located in Jurija Gagarina street. Officially named "Open Trade Center", it was colloquially called Buvljak, a generic short term for that type of markets (Serbian: buvlja pijaca).

=== Location ===
The market is located along the north side of the street, stretching to the New Belgrade Railway Station, in the initial section of the street. It occupies the southwest corner of the Block 43. South of Buvljak, across the Yuri Gagarin street, is the neighborhood of Savski Nasip, while the Block 42 on the west separates it from Belville. The market is partially encircled by the above-ground access road to the Ada Bridge, and the adjoining interchange.

=== History ===
Buvljak was opened in 1994 and with an area of 43,000 m^{2} (460,000 sq ft) was the largest such facility in Serbia. For the first year and a half, the marked basically worked only on weekends. In 1997, the row of shops was constructed to follow the rim of the market, while the plateau inside was equipped with 1,000 market stalls. By 1999, due to the Sanctions against Yugoslavia, the flea market accommodated over 300,000 customers during the weekends. A special bus tours were organized from all over Serbia to specifically bring customers to Buvljak. After the Chinese Shopping Mall was opened in the Block 70, the revenues fell by 30–40%. When the construction of the access road to the bridge began, the central plateau was reorganized in 2010 and now has 787 stalls on 23,190 m^{2} (249,600 sq ft). Though all sorts of commodities can be found (food, plastic products, car gear and spare parts, consumer electronics, dishes, household items), the most abundant are the stalls with cloths and footwear.

=== Future ===
The Block 42 is projected as the location of the future Belgrade's main bus station, so the city's General Urban Plan envisioned the displacement of the market. The section where the market is located at the moment is planned for the shopping mall and a business building, 65 to 100 m (213 to 328 ft) high. Even though the removal was scheduled for 2017 and was later postponed to 2018, the new location of Buvljak is not yet known. Possible sites include areas in other parts of New Belgrade, like those just south across the Yuri Gagarin street (Savski Nasip) or at the westernmost section of the municipality, in the neighborhood of Dr Ivan Ribar. Also, sections of other municipalities, like Zemun or Voždovac, were being considered. New Buvljak is envisioned as the modern retail park, rather than the old style flea market. It should cover an area of 32,000 m^{2} (340,000 sq ft), with 1,000 stalls of 7.5 m^{2} (81 sq ft). All stalls will be mobile, with electricity, and will be closed by the roll up doors. The entire facility will be encircled with the 5 km (3.1 mi) long green wall, while inside it will have wide paved pedestrian paths with green avenues and a covered central square with restaurants and coffee shops. On 14 July 2017, mayor of Belgrade Siniša Mali announced that dislocation of the market will not start before 2019 and hinted it will remain on New Belgrade.

In July 2019, city organized bidding for the Buvljak's lot, announcing that the market will be relocated close to the Belgrade's wholesale market Kvantaš (Kvantaška pijaca), also in New Belgrade. New deadline for the relocation was set for "the end of 2020, at the latest". In August 2019 it was announced that the "Kopernikus" company purchased the entire 2.5 ha (6.2 acres) lot in the Block 43, which includes the market, for 2.36 billion dinars (€20 million). The company plans to build the largest business complex in Serbia, including the tallest skyscraper, "Kopernikus Tower". The town has an obligation to relocate the market, which will have to do until 2021, confirming that the old market won't be demolished until the new one is built. This was one in the series of the dubious transactions regarding "Kopernikus", which included dealings with the state owned Telekom Srbija, selling of Kopernikus cable network and purchase of the TV stations O2 (former B92) and Prva Srpska Televizija, both of which became ardently pro-government after the purchase. The company is owned by two brothers, Srđan and Zvezdan Milovanović, and connected to the government and the ruling party, as the latter is a senior member of the Serbian Progressive Party.

In March 2020, city decided to relocate the Buvljak to corner of Marka Čelebonovića and Balanička (thoroughfare T6). It will be right north of the New Bežanija Cemetery (across the Marka Čelebonovića) and east of the Kvantaš (across the Balanička). The area was already declared the Business Zone Auto-Put (Motorway). The relocation is planned for 2021. New location is deemed too distant, badly connected (only one line of public transportation) and was even compared to the future pet cemetery which is closer to the city. In December 2021, construction of the new market was announced for 2022, and complete relocation was to be finished in 2023.

In March 2023, mayor Aleksandar Šapić said that the market will be relocated much further, but on the opposite side, in the neighborhood of Miljakovac. Selected location used to be a farmers' market from 1994 to 1999. Location in Bežanija was put on hold due to the major problems with parcels ownership but remains as an option when the legal problems are solved. Deadline for the finished works in Miljakovac was set for the late October 2023, though the official info-board at the location has a deadline set for December 2024.

== Belgrade Central Bus Station ==
=== Block 42 ===
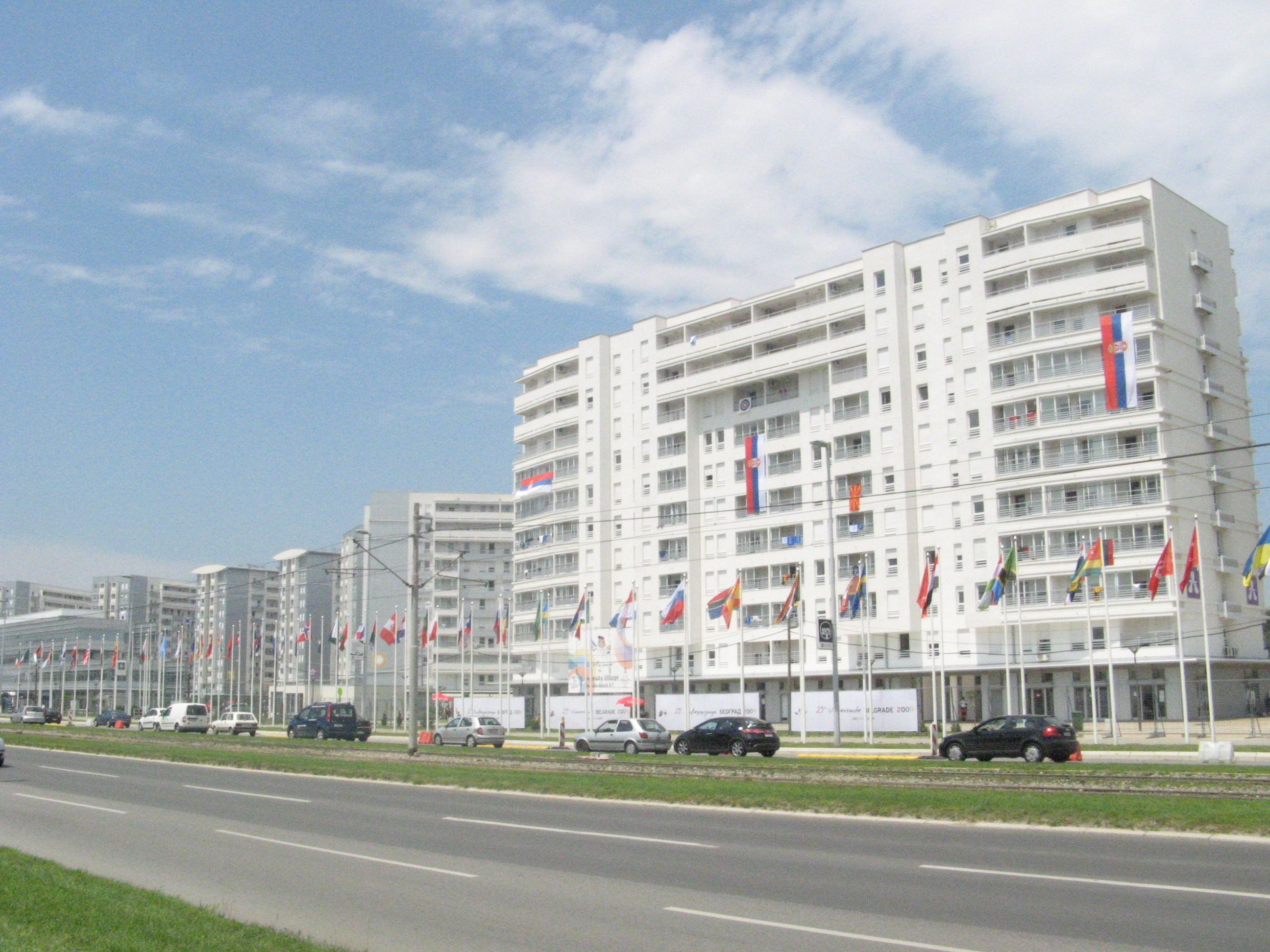
Yuri Gagarin Street passing next to the Belville neighborhood

Western section of Block 42 since 2009 was settled as the informal settlement colloquially named Romville which was, somewhat forcefully, resettled on 26 April 2012.

From then on, in the eastern section of the block, right across the Buvljak, a wild market developed. A section was fenced in 2010, so the market moved to the south, closer to Buvljak. In the fenced area, on the corner of Antifašističke borbe Street and Milutina Milankovića Boulevard, city administration decided to build a tourist attraction, called "Terazije 1930". It was envisioned as the theme park, replica of Belgrade's central square, Terazije during Interbellum. The park was never fully finished, remaining just a bunch of sets, and jokingly nicknamed the "Potemkin park". Even so, 72 million dinars (some 680,000 euros) were spent on the sets, and after the strong public reaction to the reports that the facility is illegally connected to the electric grid, the replica was torn down in 2015. Wild market immediately settled the area, until it was fenced again in 2016. Parking lot in the block, arranged when "Buvljak" was opened in 1994, was closed in August 2016. As intercity tourist buses also used the lot as the parking and terminus for several years, they were banned, too, two months later.

Wild market which remained across "Buvljak" was completely unregulated, had no water or electricity, any order or market stalls as the goods are being sold from the cardboard boxes or directly of the ground. Because of that, and of the growing amount of garbage which surrounds it, the market has been colloquially called "Kolera" ("cholera"). In July 2017 the area was fenced to prevent both the selling on the lot and its usage as the parking lot for cars and buses, due to the impending construction of the bus station. The fencing off had no effect as the lot was soon again turned into the illegal market with piles of garbage, so in October 2017 the ninth operation of cleaning the area in the past 4 years began. It was estimated than in the previous 4 months over 350 m^{3} (12,000 cu ft) of garbage piled on the lot. After cleaning, the lot will be closed again, with regular and communal police patrolling the area.

In May 2019 construction of the NCR Corporation Campus in Block 42 began. The building is planned as the adjoining object to the future bus station. The total floor area is 30,000 m^{2} (320,000 sq ft), it will host 4,200 employees and should be finished in 2021.

=== Transport hub ===
Bus station New Belgrade was planned by the General Urban Plan (GUP) in 1971, envisioned as one of three new stations. They were to take over the lines from the city's main bus station (BAS) in downtown, which was to be closed. It was to be named BAS West, while the BAS South would be in Autokomanda and BAS North in Viline Vode, near the Pančevo Bridge. Revised GUP in 1985 still predicted all three stations, but none was constructed. Next revision of GUP in 2003 excluded BAS South and North, keeping only BAS West, which was to become the city's central bus station.

For several years the project of dislocation of the city's main bus station (BAS), including the adjoining "Lasta" bus station, from the Savamala neighborhood to New Belgrade has been announced. Even set dates were given, followed by postponing: "Lasta" was to be dislocated by 2015 and BAS by 2018. Proposed location of the new station was Block 42, which stretches from the "Yuri Gagarin" to the New Belgrade's railway station (south-north) and between the Buvljak and Belville (east-west). In July 2017, when demolition of "Lasta" station began, city government announced that the new bus station will be finished by July 2019. A foundation stone is to be set by the end of 2017 and the works are projected to last for 18 months. The station is to be patterned after the Lisbon bus station and it is envisioned to have 135 platforms and 55 bus parking spots, with the total area of 13,000 m^{2} (140,000 sq ft). A public underground garage with 200 parking spots is also projected and, to accommodate over 1,200 buses daily, surrounding streets, including the "Yuri Gagarin", will receive an additional lane. Authors of the 2014 project are Milan and Vladimir Lojanica. The adjoining railway station will be renovated and expanded with the station building, new parking, etc., so together with the new bus station, they will make a new transport hub of Belgrade. The first object in the complex is supposed to be the Annex, which, when everything is finished, will physically connect the bus and railway stations. Built under the Ada Bridge access roads, covering an area of 1,400 m (4,600 ft) and costing 140.4 million dinars (€1.17 million), it should have been constructed between February and July 2017. Due to the delays caused by the problems with documentation and permits, works were moved to August–December 2017. It will serve as the temporary "Lasta" building until the entire complex is finished, when the building of the rest of the complex should start.

On the location of the former Terazije replica, new railway building will be built and a 100 m (330 ft) tall commercial tower. The railway station will be fully reconstructed, with the new platforms with the number of tracks expanded to seven. A new parking with 200 spots will be built, too.

In November 2017 it was announced that the Annex will be skipped and the main building will be built first. But, as the paperwork for it is still not finished, the construction won't start before May 2018. By this time, the original contract has been changed four times. Construction finally began on 27 February 2018, with the projected total cost of €25 million and duration of 18 months. It turned put that this was actually the cornerstone of the annex, not the stationery building. Though it is not finished, in August 2018 it was announced that the incoming platforms will be relocated from the mail bus station. According to the president of the city hall, Nikola Nikodijević, the annex will be a prefabricated building which would serve as the main bus station until the proper building is finished. The projected closing of the main station is 18 months. Still, the platforms will be relocated, but close to the present location, behind the existing building. As this is consistent with the manner of city administration to close and shut down facilities without building or equipping the new ones, architect Branko Kovačević called this a "series of unarticulated moves", "foolish situations" and situation when at the same time you are "building the foundation and painting the walls". At this time, authorities refused to disclose when the new bus station in Block 42 will be finished.

The works never began in earnest and by October 2018 came to the complete stop. Despite the quite obvious fact that no works have been done, which was confirmed by the BAS, the official investor of the new building, and a statement by the same company that the planning paperwork haven't been compiled and that building permit hasn't been issued, deputy mayor Goran Vesić stated that the works began on 13 May 2019 and that they will be finished in 18 months. Though Vesić promised that the new building will be "noticeably visible" by September 2019, by August nothing of the modern new building couldn't be seen. In December 2019 the completion deadline was moved to "probably 2021".

Proper works finally began in the early 2020. It was planned for the plateaus and bus station platforms to be finished by the end of the year. Foundations works for the massive building also began, but the construction above the ground was halted as there was still no permit. The Lojanicas' project envisioned it as the workplace for 200 people, instead of 700 as it was planned. Also, great parking for the tourist buses was added later into the mix. It was confirmed that the entire complex will be fully finished in 2021. Although the widening, arranging and expanding of the surrounding streets and public spaces has even shorter deadline than the station complex, these works hadn't begun by March 2020. The station's management confirmed that the old station will not be relocated until the new one is completely finished. This was changed again in August 2020 when the works in the neighboring streets fully began and it was announced that annex will become operational and taking over 50% of lines from the old bus station by the end of 2020. Construction of the main building was still on hold as the detailed regulatory plan, adopted in 2016 based on the Lojanicas' project, was changed several times and had to be changed again. Subsequent additions to the project and lack of coordination between the city and the BAS was partially blamed for this, as the BAS officials often gave unofficial statements contradicting city administrators, and stopped issuing official statements on the new station matter in 2017.

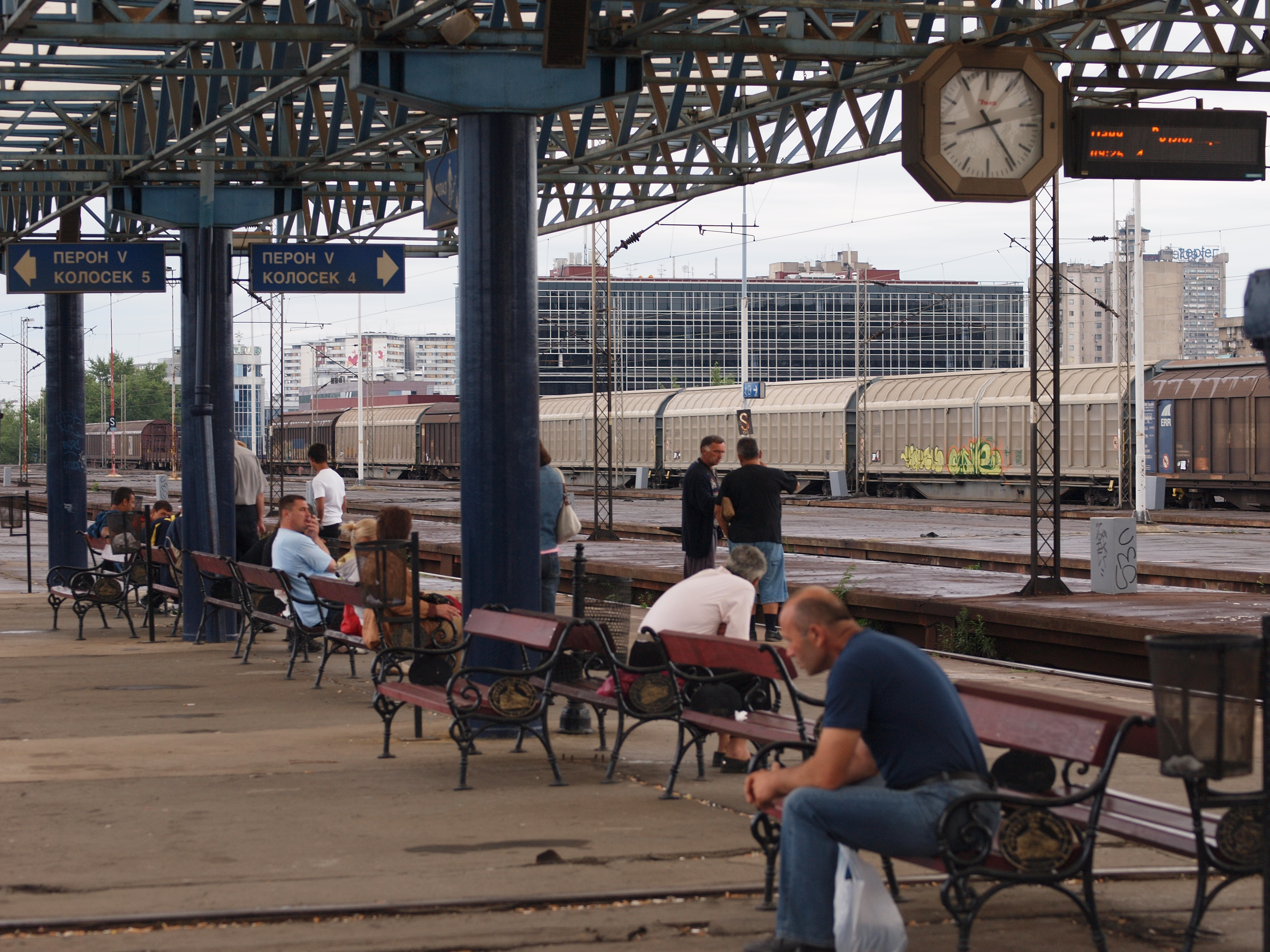
New Belgrade railway station

Relocation of half of the lines to the new station from the old one, was announced for the late 2020, but the idea was abandoned. Either because the new location was not nearly equipped for that task, or because of the fiasco when the same thing was done with the Belgrade Main railway station, which was also closed because of the Belgrade Waterfront, and new station wasn't finished. Latest changes of the project, which would allow construction of the much larger building, were adopted in December 2020, and city announced completion of the works for the late 2021. Reconstruction of the surrounding, access streets, including the right side of Yuri Gagarin Street, was declared finished in the late December 2020.

In March 2021 it was announced that the complex can't be finished before 2022, and in August 2021 it was confirmed that the old bus station will be fully closed and transferred to Yuri Gagarin Street in March 2022. As the new station building will not be finished at that time, the Annex will be used for that purpose. Nothing of this happened by June 2022, when works were basically halted again due to the lack of funds. Some €21 million was invested thus far and estimated €9.5 million is still needed. Still claiming that the relocation of the old station may start "in few months", city admitted that the works can't be finished before 2023. Union representatives of the BAS announced they will not allow the partial relocation due to the inadequate new quarters, and that old station will be moved only when the stationary building is finished in the new complex, while reporters referred to the entire process of construction in Block 42 a "Mexican telenovela".

In July 2022, the BAS officially withdrew from the project, handing it over to the city. New mayor, Aleksandar Šapić, said that the city will now finish the bus station in "couple of months". Works were almost completely halted as the new partner has not been selected by the city. Planned budget for the entire project, €21 million, has already been spent, and city allocated only minimal funds for now. Experts now pointed out the architecturally overblown project, and bad monetary and construction planning as finishing a smaller part of the mega station would make it partially operational by now. In October 2022 mayor Šapić called the station a millstone around Belgrade"s neck.

After proper works stopped in 2017, in July 2023 Šapić stated that if everything is OK the station will become operational "at full capacity" at the beginning of 2024. The BAS changed management and made new deal with the government to finish the station, including new credits. He was then mocked when the pro-government television wanting to show how works are heating up, filmed only few workers who were hand plucking weeds, while other media recorded no works at all. However, President of Serbia Aleksandar Vučić said a month later that the station will be finished in 2025, and that works are so late, because of million other projects, like the reconstruction of the BIGZ building and its Bauhaus façade. Despite the station building will not be finished in the next few years, in November 2023 mayor Šapić reiterated that the station will be operational from January 2024, but that didn't happen.

=== New Belgrade Railway Station ===
The station is built on a 450 m (1,480 ft)-long elevated platform. The construction was made of 25.000 m^{3} (882.9 cu ft) prestressed concrete. A deadline was set for September 1969 with the first trains passing through in December 1969. The project was ambitious and detailed, including construction of a mini city under the station: 25.000 m^{2} (269.10 sq ft) of built-up space hosting numerous shops, mega mall, restaurants, snack bars, pastry shop, tourist agencies, exchange offices, various agencies, flower shops, cosmetics and toy shops, souvenir stands, department store, 24/7 cinema and variety show. The deadline was 1974, but ultimately none of these additional objects were built.

In connection with the construction of the Belgrade–Novi Sad high-speed railway in 2017–2022, the station was partially reconstructed and upgraded, including works on the plateau, canopy, staircase, and addition of ticket booth and six elevators. Works will be finished in May 2023. With the growing importance of the station, the proper station building is also planned.
