= Dr Ivan Ribar =

Dr Ivan Ribar Др Иван Рибар
- Urban neighbourhood
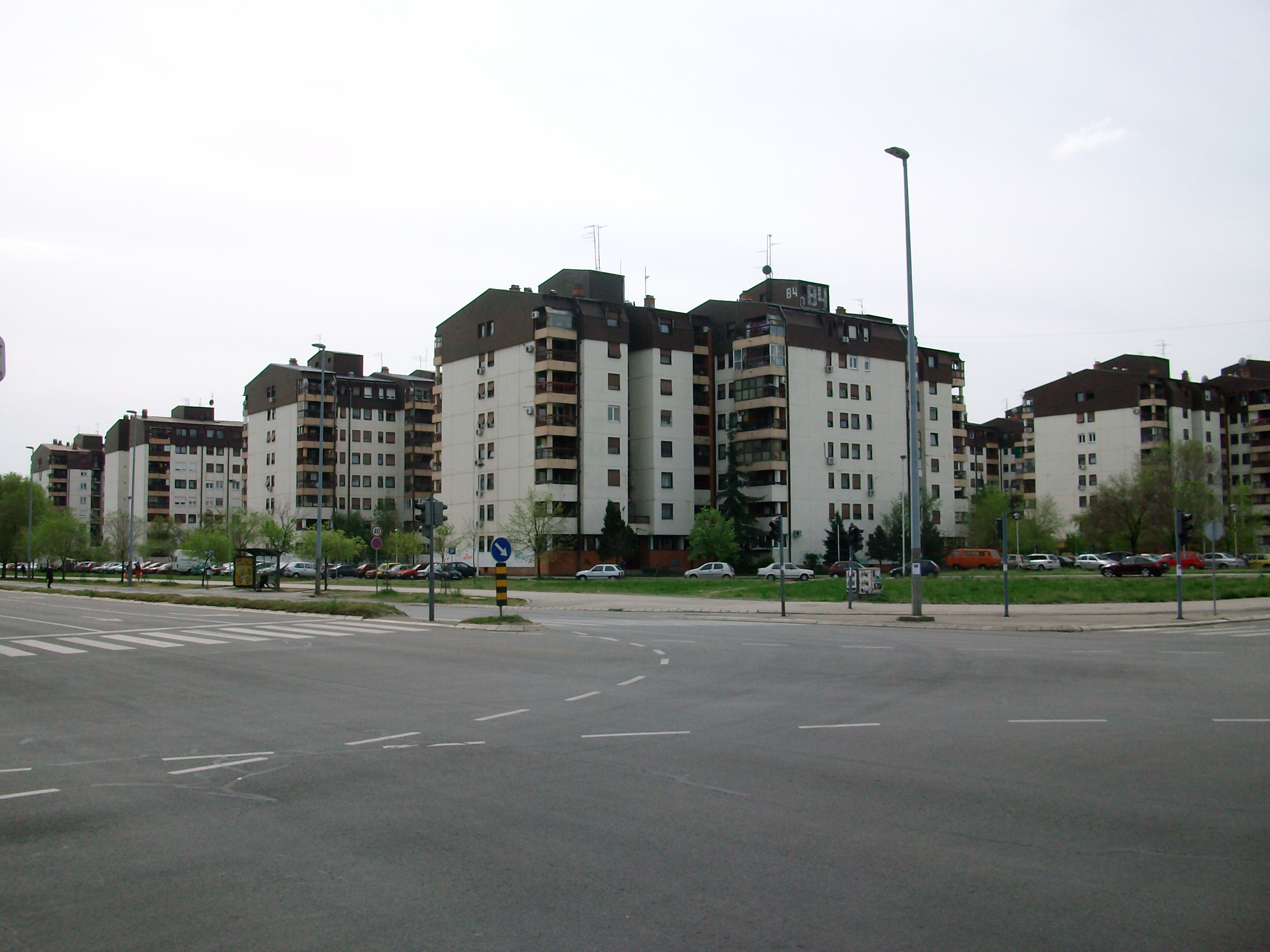
- Dr Ivan Ribar
- Etymology: street named after Ivan Ribar
- Location within Belgrade
- Coordinates: 44°48′02″N 20°22′02″E
- Country: Serbia
- Region: Belgrade
- Municipality: New Belgrade
- Neighborhood: 1989; 37 years ago
- Local community: 25 June 2014; 12 years ago

Area
  - Total: 7.36 km^{2} (2.84 sq mi)

Population (2018)
  - Total: 13,000
  - Density: 1,800/km^{2} (4,600/sq mi)
- Time zone: UTC+1 (CET)
  - Summer (DST): UTC+2 (CEST)
- Area code: +381(0)11
- Car plates: BG

Dr Ivan Ribar (Serbian Cyrillic: Др Иван Рибар) is an urban neighborhood of Belgrade, the capital of Serbia. It is located in Belgrade's municipality of New Belgrade. It forms a local community (mesna zajednica), a sub-municipal administrative unit within New Belgrade. As extensive development of New Belgrade began in 1948, the area was divided in blocks. Blocks 71 and 72 which constitute the neighborhood, were built from 1989 to 1994, as some of the final blocks constructed in the 20th century.

== Location ==
Dr Ivan Ribar is the westernmost neighborhood in the southwestern outskirts of New Belgrade, in the extension of the Yuri Gagarin Street. It is narrow and rectangular, bordered on the east by Dr Ivan Ribar Street and the neighborhood of Blokovi, and on the west by the mostly uninhabited field of Jasenovo. On the south it borders the embankment on the Sava river, and an extension of Savski Nasip. The neighborhoods of Ledine and Bežanija are to the north, across the Vinogradska and Vojvođanska streets, and this section extends to the west into the New Surčin, a local community of Surčin.

== Geography ==
The area where the settlement is located is known as Donje Polje (Lower Field). It is a marshy lowland, cris-crossed by the network of draining canals, including Petrac canal, which is connected to the Galovica, extending outside of New Belgrade. When residential block Mileva Marić Ajnštajn was built after 2011, one of the canals was moved further to the west, making neighborhood's western border.

Geographic localities in the western section, along the border with the Surčin municipality are Dragova Greda, Dudova and Gajić, while Jasenova is in the eastern part, where Block 71 developed. Local community's bank includes the river island of Jocina Ada. Across the bank is the southern part of Ada Ciganlija.

== History ==
The area used to be, and today in its non-urbanized parts still is, a marshland. It remained uninhabited for a long time, but eventually some houses with gardens and orchards were built. In 1968, the idea of constructing a Formula One racetrack in the area was suggested, as the first such venue behind the Iron Curtain, but the idea was dropped until Hungaroring in 1986. The construction in the area of present neighborhood was originally banned, due to the high noise of the planes taking on and off the nearby Surčin airport. This was later changed, which allowed the construction of the residential blocks in the late 1980s.

Construction of the Block 71 and southern section of Block 72, at the crossroads of the Yury Gagarin and Dr Ivan Ribar streets, began in 1989. Northern part of the Block 72, at the roundabout in the Vojvođanska Street, was finished in 1994. The roundabout is the starting point of Vinogradska, Vojvođanska, Dr Ivan Ribara and Surčinska streets, so as the 2023 "half-motorway" connection to the Miloš the Great Motorway.

As one of the last neighborhoods built in Novi Beograd before the collapse of the Serbian economy in the early 1990s, it initially was known only by its name. Later block numbers were assigned to it (as for most of New Belgrade) so that the southern part of the neighborhood is now Block 71 and the northern part is Block 72, so far, the two highest numbers of all the blocks.

In 2011, expansion of the Block 72 began, which ultimately became known as the settlement Mileva Marić Ajnštajn, after the main street in the neighborhood named after Mileva Marić-Einstein. Though officially announced as the social housing project, it turned out later that the apartments were sold with a profit, with falsely reported larger areas, and were built from the inadequate, sub-standard and low-quality materials. The buildings were finished in 2013, but a major scandal broke out by 2014 due to the sub-standard and poisonous wall-coating used by the contractor which resulted in bad odor in two buildings which were evacuated for re-works and became known as the Stinking buildings.

On 25 June 2014, the municipal assembly of New Belgrade voted to establish the new local community, Dr Ivan Ribar. It occupies the southwest corner of New Belgrade, bordering the municipality of Surčin. Formed from the parts of the Bežanija Blocks and Sava local communities, it also occupies the Savski Nasip riparian zone. This was supported by 9,000 signatures by the residents collected in 2015, and the local community was finally formed in 2016.

Further expansion of Block 72 ensued in 2016–2017. In 2017, the location in the extension of the Yuri Gagarin Street was proposed as the location of the city's new Buvljak (flea market) in 2017. Other abandoned plans for the area included National Stadium of Serbia (which will be constructed further to the west, in Surčin), athletic stadium and tennis complex by Novak Djokovic. In November 2019, city began procedure for the construction of an elementary school in the neighborhood, in Block 72. The lot was selected, at the continuation of the Evropska Street. Also, another lot was selected for the planned relocation of the University of Belgrade Agricultural Faculty. As of 2023, neither plan was pursued.

In May 2022, city administration announced construction of the large Chinese shopping mall in Block 72. Company "Eurasia Trade Center" purchased two lots (total of 2.75 hectares (6.8 acres)) for 821.2 million dinars (€7 million). It should replace the old Chinese center in Block 70, which was partially damaged in fire in August 2021. The same location was originally proposed to host city's new flea market in 2017. Though city claimed they have no idea what the complex will look like, the design of the complex was revealed by the investor just two days later. The project includes construction of the extension of the Yuri Gagarin Street. Shop owners from the old center asked to stay on present location, asking help from the Chinese embassy, stating that the old shopping mall became recognizable brand in the city, but the embassy supported the construction of the new mall. Shops in the surviving section of the old shopping center continued to work, until it was destroyed in even larger fire on 24 January 2024. Main construction works were finished by August 2023 and the opening was announced for May 2024.

On 31 March 2021 construction of the 7.9 km (4.9 mi) long, direct connection of New Belgrade to the Obrenovac-Surčin Bridge, and further to the Miloš the Great Motorway, began from the roundabout at the crossroads of the Vojvođanska, Vinogradska, Surčinska and Dr Ivana Ribara streets. Originally planned to be finished in September 2022, the road was opened on 1 April 2023.

In July 2023 city announced relocation of the bus-tram depot of the city public transportation from Block 66 to Dr Ivan Ribar, behind the future Chinese center. City government turned the procedure upside down, changing the purpose of the land in the lowest ranking plans, instead changing the general plan first. The depot will spread on 32 ha (79 acres) south of the Miloš the Great Motorway access road, and west from the Petrac draining canal. It partially extends into the protected, strict sanitary zone of Belgrade's water extraction in Surčin's locality of Donje Polje, behind the Mileva Marić Ajnštajn section of the neighborhood. The new depot should be finished by 2025 or 2026.

== Sections ==
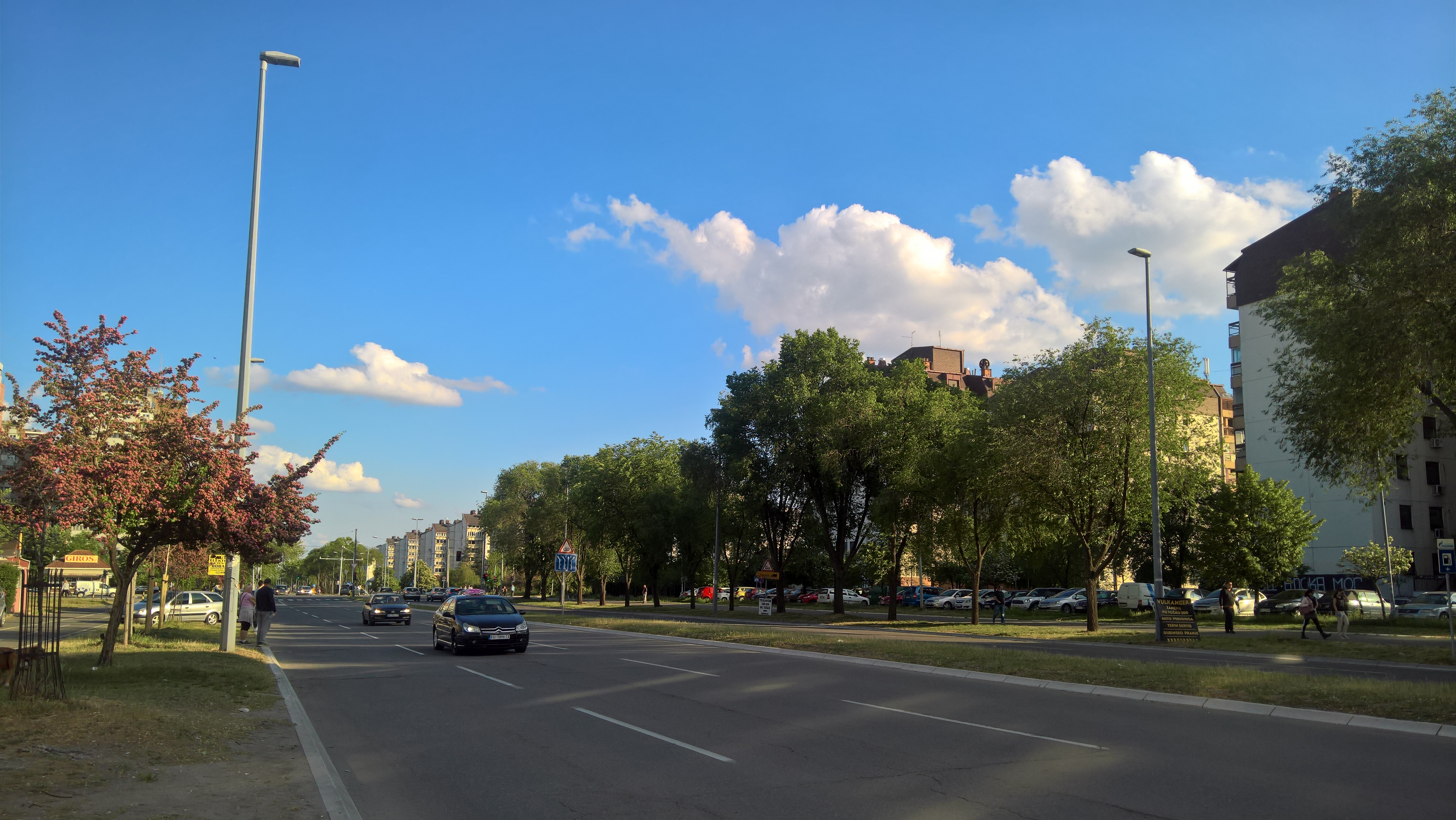
The Dr Ivana Ribara Street, the main in the neighborhood

Sections of the local community are:

- Block 71
- Blok 72
  Mileva Marić Ajnštajn
  Blokče 72
- Vinogradska Street
- Savski Nasip

The local community Dr Ivan Ribar consists of four sections: residential blocks 71 and 72 on the east (the neighborhood itself), Vinogradska Street on the north, and Savski Nasip on the south, along the Sava's riverbank, Block 72 additionally has two sub-sections, the neighborhood of Mileva Marić Ajnštajn, along the northern part of the street of the same name, and Blokče 72 (Little Block 72) in the southern part, with mostly non-urbanized area between them, Donje Polje.

Urbanized section along the Vinogradska (Vineyard) Street is much older than the core of the neighborhood. It is characterized by the Vojvodina's settlement style, architectural concept of ground floor houses with yards on both sides of the house. By the 2020s, this was largely compromised by the non-planned construction along the street, which includes various structures like business and residential buildings, warehouses, repair shops, large hoophouses, etc. The street is not the demarcation line between Dr Ivan Ribar and Ledine, as Dr Ivan Ribar includes houses on both sides of the street.

Savski Nasip is an embankment along the Sava's left bank, stretching thought the entire local community's section of the river. With its riparian, forested zone it was made to protect Belgrade from floods. The embankment was largely compromised in the 20th century. City government decided not to act on the issue of destruction of the embankment, which included intensive cutting of the forest, filling up of the riverbed and construction of hard-material, large, multi-floor structures, digging of the cesspits, illegal use of the road on top of the embankment for cars, trucks and heavy machinery, etc.

== Characteristics ==
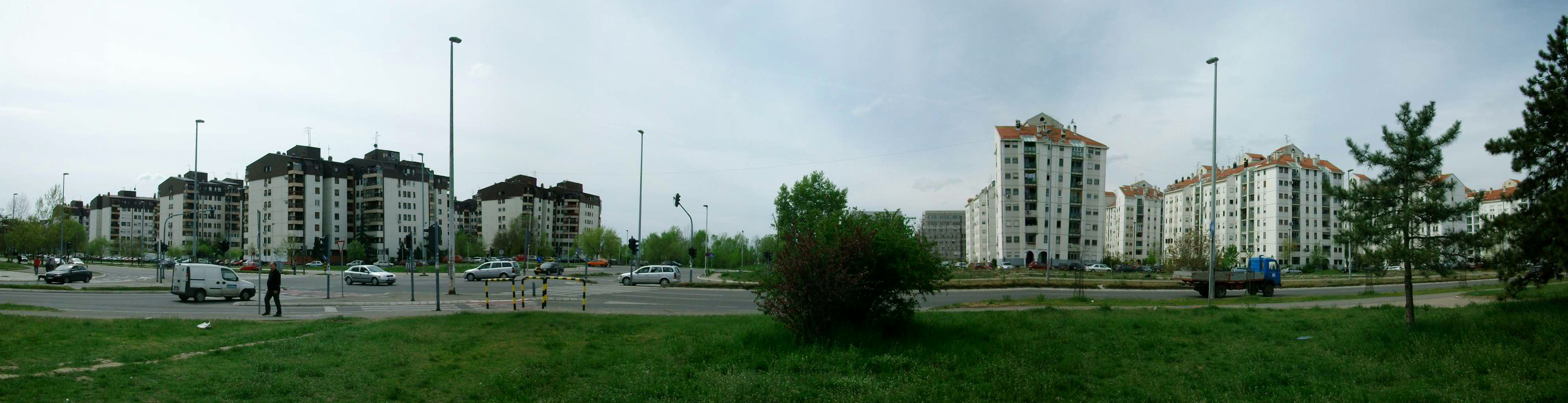
Panoramic view

Estimated population in 2018 was 13,000, of which 5,000 in Mileva Marić Ajnštajn.

The neighborhood is entirely residential. A gravel-selling facility is located on the bank of the Sava river, across the embankment.

A roundabout at the southern end of Block 71, between it and the Block 45, is a final stop for public transportation lines connecting the neighborhood with downtown: buses number 73, 94, 95, 604 and 605, and trams number 7, 9, 11 and 13. Bus line 89 has its own terminus in Block 72. Bus lines which pass next to the neighborhood are 45, 71 and 610, and minibuses E1 and E6.

Ecology is one of the main issues. Since the mid 1990s, the wide area between the buildings and the embankment became an unofficial landfill covered with waste and garbage and an environmental concern, especially due to frequent fires. Being on the edge of the city, illegal landfills appear regularly and grow in size. In the non-urbanized area there are also shantytowns, where cables and tires are being burned in order to obtain copper and other metals.

The main street was originally named after Dr Ivan Ribar, a Croatian-Yugoslav politician, Ivan Ribar (1881-1968). The name later spread to the new neighborhood.

== Sources ==
- Beograd - plan grada [Belgrade - city map] (Map). 1:20,000. COBBISS.SR-ID 132560908 (in Serbian). Novi Beograd: Magic Map. 2006. ISBN 86-83501-53-1.
