= Blokovi =

Blokovi Блокови Novobeogradski blokovi Новобеоградски блокови
- Urban neighbourhood
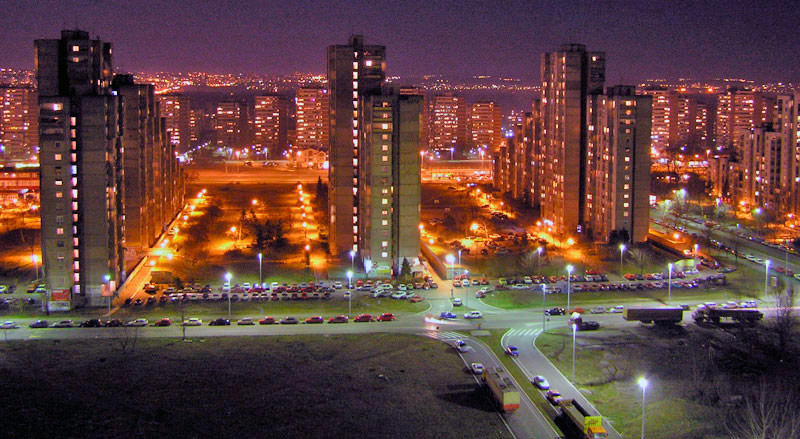
- New Belgrade's Blok 62 at night

- Location within Belgrade
- Coordinates: 44°48′N 20°23′E
- Country: Serbia
- Region: Belgrade
- Municipality: New Belgrade
- Established: 1948; 78 years ago

Population (2011)
  - Total: 79,310
- Time zone: UTC+1 (CET)
  - Summer (DST): UTC+2 (CEST)
- Area code: +381(0)11
- Car plates: BG

Blokovi (Serbian Cyrillic: Блокови, lit. 'Blocks') or Novobeogradski blokovi (Serbian Cyrillic: Новобеоградски блокови, lit. 'New Belgrade Blocks') is the semi-formal plural name for a group of urban neighborhoods in Belgrade's municipality of New Belgrade.

The neighborhood is located in the southeastern urbanized section of the New Belgrade municipality, on the left bank of the Sava river, across from the islands of Ada Međica and Ada Ciganlija. It is bound by the neighborhoods of Bežanija and Bežanijska Kosa from the north, Block 58 from the southeast (neighborhood of Savski Nasip) and the neighborhood of Dr Ivan Ribar from the west.

When construction of New Belgrade began in 1948, the area designed for the future urban expansion was divided in 72 blocks (with several sub-blocks, like 8-a, 9-a, 9-b, 70-a, etc., and some numbers are missing). Not having any specific name like most other parts of the newly built New Belgrade, over time, this area became colloquially known simply as Blokovi ('Blocks').

The population of the neighborhood is 79,310, including the neighborhood of Dr Ivan Ribar. But the boundaries of the Blokovi neighborhood are very informal and roughly can be divided into two sections separated by the Yuri Gagarin Street: the north part or, so-called Bežanijski blokovi ('Bežanija Blocks') and the south part or Savski blokovi ('Sava Blocks').

== Sava Blocks ==
=== Characteristics ===
The neighborhood is known for its two rows of over one hundred residential buildings, especially blocks 45 and 70 with original setup of two sets of 21 (totalling 42) identical four and two-story buildings close to the river, with large playgrounds in between, and two sets of over 40 (totalling 80) similar red brick skyscrapers close to the Jurija Gagarina street. The area close to the river is a continuous embankment on the Sava river, stretching throughout the whole neighborhood, known as the Sava riverbank (Serbian: Savski kej / Савски кеј).

The rows of two-story and 4-story buildings in Block 70 and especially Block 45 are also known as Naselje Sunca (Serbian Cyrillic: Насеље Сунца, lit. 'Sunny Community'), because of the peaceful environment ideal for kids and optimism and positive energy that prevailed in 1970s Belgrade. Also, the Block 45 was inhabited by a large number of artists and intellectuals, though the structure of the population has changed a bit since the 1970s.

Omladinskih brigada street divides Block 70-a from Block 70, Gandijeva street Block 70 from Block 44 and Nehruova street Block 44 from Block 45. Through the middle of the whole neighborhood curves the 4.5 km (2.8 mi) long Lazaro Kardenas promenade. At the end of the Gandijeva street, on the Sava riverbank, a monumental bust of Indian leader Mahatma Gandhi (after whom the street was named) was erected in 2007, as a pre-celebration of October 2, Gandhi's birthday (Gandhi Jayanti) and the UN proclaimed International Day of Non-Violence

The Galovica canal, which flows into the Sava, drains the large area of the east Syrmia and the Fruška Gora mountain, due to its interconnections with the Jarčina river-canal system. As streams in the upper watershed flow through the numerous settlements, farms, industrial and artisan complexes and warehouses, wastewater pollutes Galovica. In addition, various smaller drainage canals also pollute the Galovica, which then empties large amounts of untreated sanitary and technological wastewater into the Sava.

A new park, Park Block 70, was opened in 2011 and is one of the youngest parks in Belgrade. It is located in the east-central section of the Block 70, along the Lazaro Cardenas promenade. It consists of the open green areas, children's playground, fitness equipment in the open, small wooden pavilion and 158 tree seedlings.

In January 2022, city announced that new buildings will not be built in the remaining non-urbanized areas of blocks 44, 45, 70 and 70-A. They might eventually be turned into the playgrounds, parking lots, sports fields, etc.

==== Block 45 ====
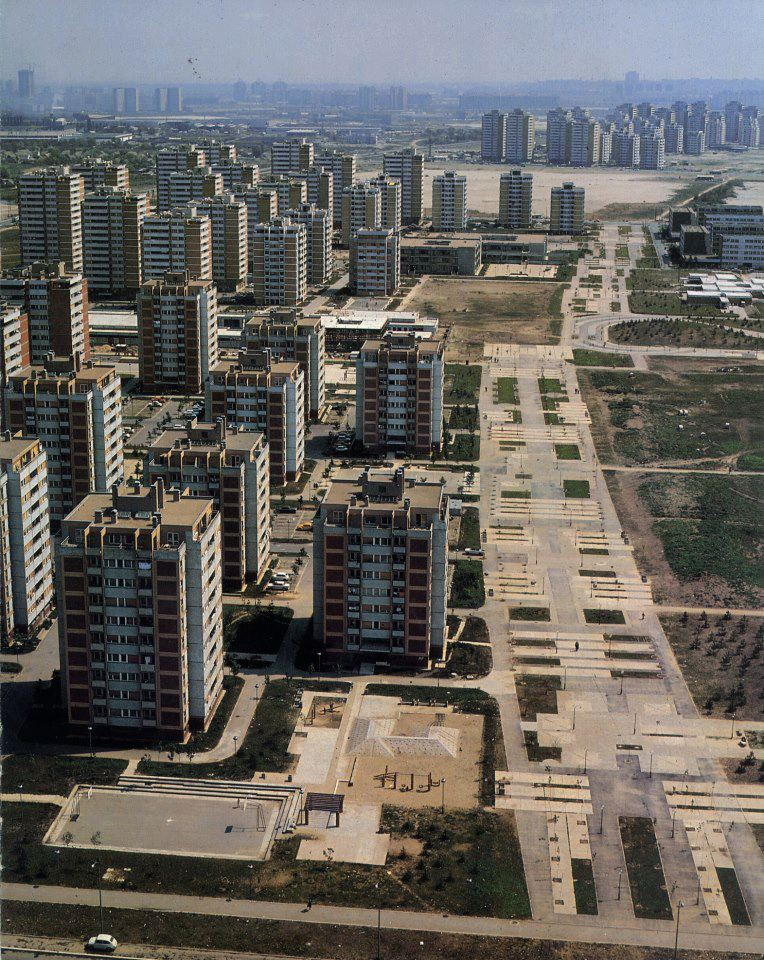
Aerial view of Block 45, c. 1975

The residential complex of Block 45 was built from 1968 to 1972, when the first tenants moved in. The block was fully settled in 1973 and 1974.

Prior to 1968 the land along the river was a thick forest while the inland was a swamp which was drained and filled with sand. The area was known for its wildlife, especially the water birds. The block covers an area of 62 ha (150 acres) and has 45 skyscrapers and 23 4 and 2-storey buildings. Chief architects were Grgur Popović (who designed the skyscrapers), Mihailo Čanak (8-storey buildings) and Rista Šekerinski (4 and 2-storey buildings).

The complete urban arrangement of the block continued in the next several years: green areas (trees, lawns), promenades, school, kindergarten, etc. By 1974, the quay along the Sava was finished. In the westernmost extension of Block 45, where the canal Petrac flows into the Sava, there are two wild beaches on the river bank, "Bombaj" and "Petrac". Until the Block 71 in the future neighborhood Dr Ivan Ribar was built, Block 45 was the last section of urban Belgrade on this side, after which the Syrmian arable fields began and the Galovica canal was located.

The neighborhood was colloquially named Naselje Sunca ('Sun Settlement'). It was described as an "utopian, biopolitical project, constructed in the sunset of the Yugoslav socialism". An exhibition titled "45 years of Block 45" in the artistic Savamala neighborhood in March 2019 marked the 45th anniversary of the block.

=== Economy and transportation ===
The neighborhood is entirely residential, without any industrial facilities. A commercial sector began to develop alongside the Jurija Gagarina street in the 1990s, and expanded in the 2000s.

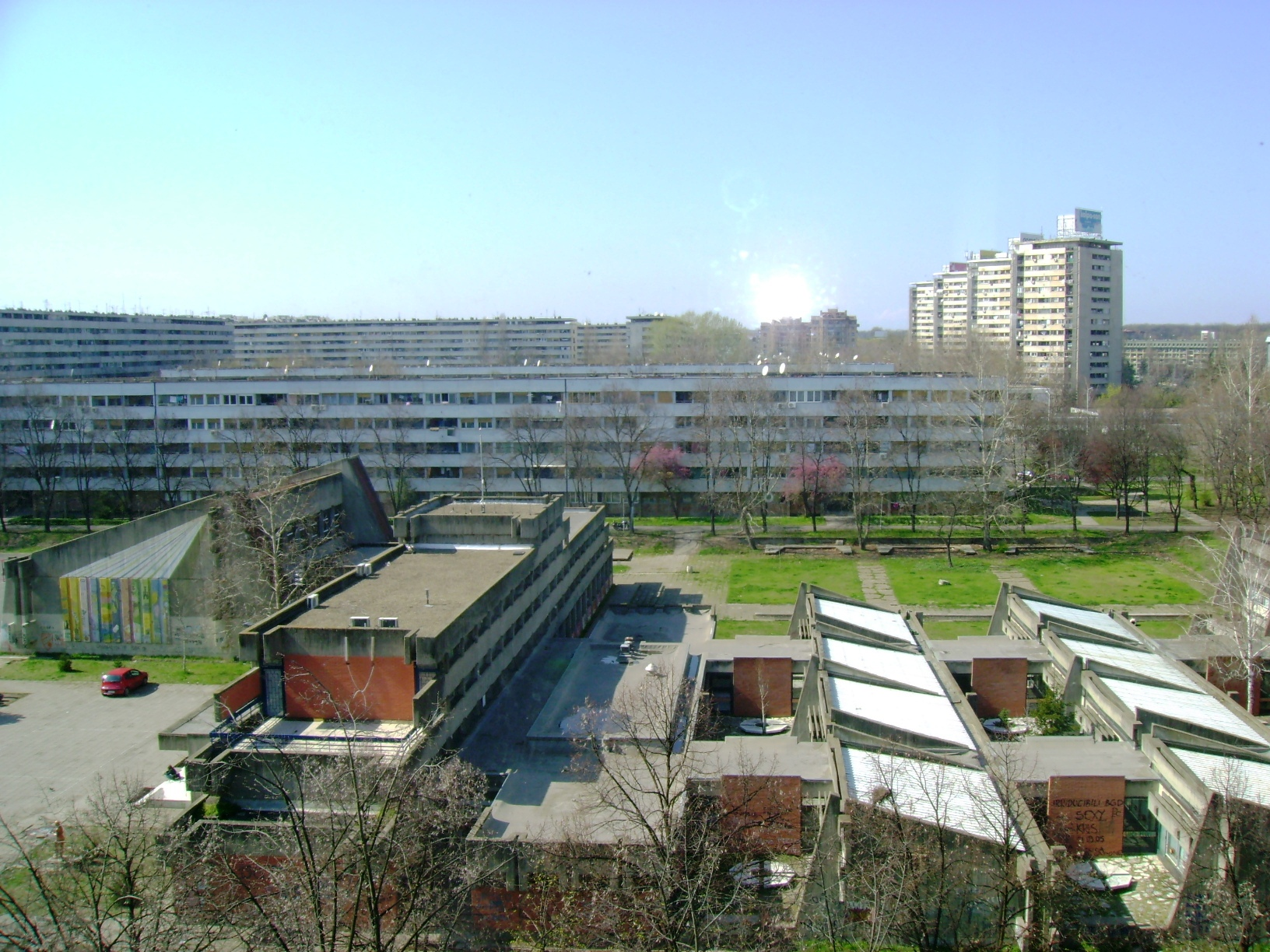
Blok 38 - around Ratko Mitrović primary school

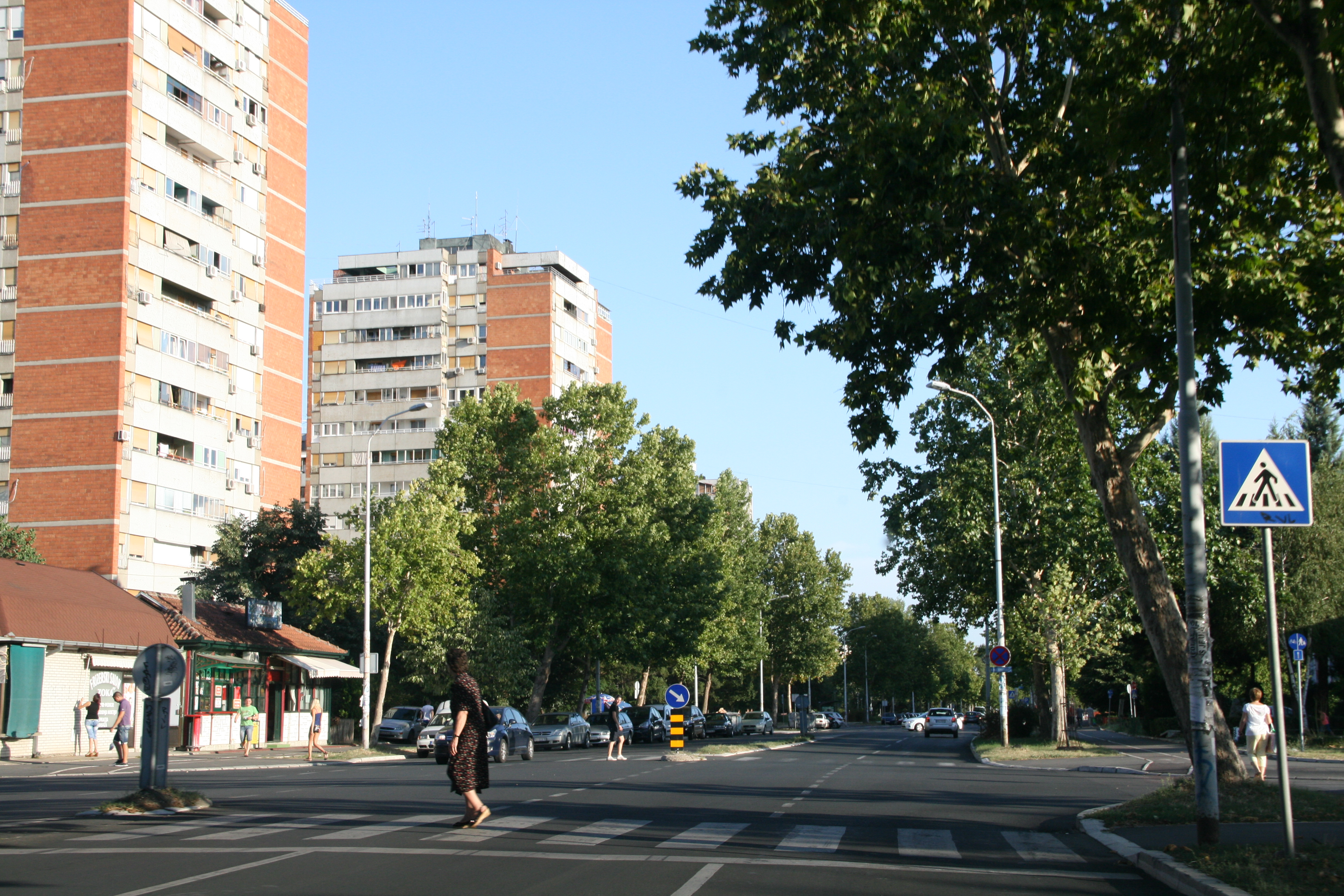
Gandhi street between Blok 44 and Blok 70

Major commercial or social facilities (almost all of them on the Jurija Gagarina street) comprise:

- Block 70-a: one of the rare privately owned farmers markets in Belgrade, "Mala Sava", founded in 2004; Delta-auto car dealership, large Honda car dealership, Hellenic Petroleum gas station and the Omega-beton gravel selling facility on the Sava bank;
- Block 70: several shopping malls including a Chinese market, OMV gas station and large postal facilities (including two separate post offices); it also has a primary school "20. oktobar", kindergarten and its own local community (Serbian: mesna zajednica) of Savski kej.
- Block 44: green market, several shopping malls including one of the first modern super-malls in Belgrade, the Piramida (Serbian for pyramid, because of its shape) and a McDonald's restaurant; it also has two medical clinics.
- Block 45: four shopping malls, including "Enjub"; it also has a primary school Branko Radičević (relocated in 1972 from Topčidersko Brdo), once the biggest elementary school in the Balkans, which had elite quality education - winning many federal level prizes at competitions in subjects such as mathematics, literature etc., kindergarten, nursery, FK Sava's soccer field and its own local community of Sava.

Chinese Shopping Center in Block 70 was opened in the 1990s as the regular, outdoor shopping center, with clothes shops, goldsmiths, tailors, shoemakers, and coffee shops. First Chinese shops were opened in the late 1990s and soon prevailed. In time, it expanded into the proper shopping mall with two floors, consisting of the old building (with over 360 shops), divided in blocks A and B, and the new, even taller separate building. Block A was badly damaged in the massive fire which broke out on 12 August 2021. Over 100 shops were destroyed, despite some 130 firefighters were employed. In May 2022, construction of the new Chinese shopping center further on the city outskirts, in Block 72, was announced. Shop owners from the old center asked to stay on present location, asking help from the Chinese embassy, stating that the old shopping mall became recognizable brand in the city (as an unambiguous destination for the phrase "let's go to the Chinese").

Routes of the public transportation lines pass through all of the streets in the neighborhood: bus lines 45, 68, 73, 76, 81, 82, 89, 94, 95 and 610 and tramway lines 7, 9 and 11.

In March 2020, construction of the first pedestrian-cyclist bridge in Belgrade in 2021 was announced. As the continuation of the Omladinskih Brigada Street in Block 70, it will connect New Belgrade with the island of Ada Ciganlija across the Sava. Public, partially underground garage with 300 parking spots is planned at the end of the street. This is the second part of the project city administration alleged is the result of citizens' online voting (first part is relocation of the Old Sava Bridge on dry land, in the Park Ušće to become an "attraction"). Reporters and public either distanced from the voting or debunked it as being rigged. City then announced plans for a completely new bridge on the location, instead of relocation of the old one, and in December 2020 announced it will be finished in 2022.

Local residents in the Sava Blocks protested, claiming the bridge will disrupt neighborhood's green zones, create even larger traffic jams, and turn Block 70 into the vast parking lot for Ada visitors. The 2020 petition against the bridge was signed by 10,000 residents. City said the bridge will be built regardless, but moved the start of the construction for the late 2023 or early 2024. When the plan was opened for public viewing in December 2022, citizens filed 3,500 complaints. With the announcement of the relocation of the Belgrade Zoo to Ada Ciganlija, mayor Aleksandar Šapić also announced pushing of this project, stating that by the early 2025 the bridge will be finished. City organized the design competition only in November 2023, giving a deadline of 765 days just for the completion of all permits and paperwork. The bridge should be 520 m (1,710 ft) long.

In December 2021, city announced restoration of the riverine public transportation, which was discontinued decades ago. One of the first two proposed lines should be Block 45-Sports Center Milan Gale Muškatirović, at Dorćol. In the first, testing phase, it would be shorter, connecting Block 70 and Branko's Bridge. New mayor Aleksandar Šapić, however, stated in July 2022 that the riverine public transportation project will not be pursued further, calling it too expensive and "pointless".

==== Nightlife ====
The neighborhood is known for numerous splavovi (singular splav), barges adapted into cafés, clubs and restaurants along the Sava Quay. By 2019, there was basically no free space along the Sava bank as it was completely occupied by the barges that are the hubs of Belgrade's nightlife. The first was "Savski Galeb". Opened in 1987, it occupied an adapted old freight barge. The "Pingvin" was opened in 1988, but soon changed to "Estrada" which sparked the boost of similar facilities. The first purpose-built barge-discothèque, it was a blueprint for all the future venues of this type all over the city. It was the first barge with a DJ and with a separated dance floor and booths for sitting. It was well visited since the opening, but the clientele changed in time. Originally, it was made from the "roamers" from all over the city, but with the general criminalization of the society, it became the gathering point for the members of the criminal clans from Zemun and New Belgrade. Next to "Estrada", a much larger "Triton" was opened. One of the most popular barges at the time, it originally functioned as a "disco on the water". "Triton" was a location of numerous criminal shootouts. None of these venues exist today.

==== Proposed projects ====
Aqua Park

Aqua park Belgrade, announced as the second water park in Serbia after the one in the town of Jagodina, was an ultimately failed project in Block 44. Construction began in August 2005 and it was supposed to be open on 25 May 2006, but as of August 2006 only 75% of the preparatory works had been completed and the works stopped. Investors claimed it would be open for the 2007 season and it would feature the longest "family waterslide" (117 metres (384 ft)) and lazy river (405 metres (1,329 ft)) in Europe so as the largest indoor pool in Europe with an area of 1.600 square metres (17.22 sq ft), and children's complex (Kids City). Also, in phase two, the surrounding area of 2 hectares (4.9 acres) was to be arranged with covered pools, bowling alleys, ice rink and other sport facilities. In total, 11 pools, 21 water slide (including the 20 metres (66 ft) tall kamikaze water slide, also the tallest in Europe), and 6,500 square metres (70,000 sq ft) of water area was planned in the complex of 7 hectares (17 acres). One of the leading investors in the project, basketball player Žarko Paspalj, announced that the opening had been postponed for 2008. The construction resumed in January 2008 and the new opening date was set for late May 2008.

The investors changed, almost a dozen of them by 2007, but the construction site never looked like anything more than a dug meadow. Despite quite strong public campaign for several years how Belgrade will get aqua park, which was supposed to be an investment of €15 million, “due to the financial problems”, the project was scrapped in 2010. After 2010 city tried to reacquire the parcel but failed, officially due to the "complicated procedure". In 2014 plans were made to build a residential block on the location, but the idea was abandoned. In June 2019 city reaffirmed it will repossess the lot as the leaseholder failed to build aqua park, but that the purpose of the lot won't be changed and that aqua park will be built in the future. By the summer of 2021, the abandoned structures and pools were described as an ugliness which resemble the set of a horror movie. In February 2022 city announced that the complex will be turned into the "state level water sports center".

Gondola lift

In 1922 company "Čavlina and Sladoljev" from Zagreb drafted the project of connecting two banks of the Sava river by the cable car. In 1928, building company "Šumadija" again proposed the construction of the cable car, which they called "air tram" but this project was planned to connect Zemun to Kalemegdan on Belgrade Fortress, via Great War Island. The interval of the cabins was set at 2 minutes and the entire route was supposed to last 5 minutes. The project never realized. Engineer and CEO of the Yugoslav institute for urbanism and dwelling "Juginus", Mirko Radovanac, revived the idea in the 1990s. After conducting extensive surveys (traffic analysis, interviews with the commuters, climatic, geological, urban and other researches), "Juginus" presented the project in 1993. They proposed that the terminuses should be at the Sports Center Košutnjak and Block 44. Stops in between would include the major public transportation roundabout in Banovo Brdo, Makiš and Ada Ciganlija, five in total. They called it the "ideal route". The plan also included construction of commercial areas around the terminuses, which would cover 2,000 m^{2} (22,000 sq ft) and help with the profitability of the project. Apart from being ecological and an attraction, it was estimated that it would shorten the trip for 45 minutes.

City government included the project into the city's GUP, which envisioned the construction in phases, the first being a 1,000 m (3,300 ft) long section Block 44-Ada Ciganlija. It would lay on 8 steel pillars, 35 m (115 ft) above the ground and the trip would last for 3 minutes. The cabins were projected to receive not just the commuters, but also the bicycles, skateboards, sledges and skis, as the cableway was planned to work year-round. The complete facility would have of 27 pillars, it would be 5 km (3.1 mi) long which would be travelled in 15 minutes by 2,000 commuters per hour. Despite the project has been publicly revived by the mayors Dragan Đilas (2008–2013) and Siniša Mali (2013-2018), as of 2021 the project still didn't start. The project was then included in the Belgrade's General Regulatory Plan in December 2021, composed of two phases: New Belgrade-Ada Ciganlija-Makiš, and Makiš-Banovo Brdo-Košutnjak. After announcing relocation of the Belgrade Zoo to Ada Ciganlija in February 2023, mayor Aleksandar Šapić announced that the gondola lift project is on, and that already existing, but publicly unknown city project from 2009 will be reactivated.

== Bežanija Blocks ==
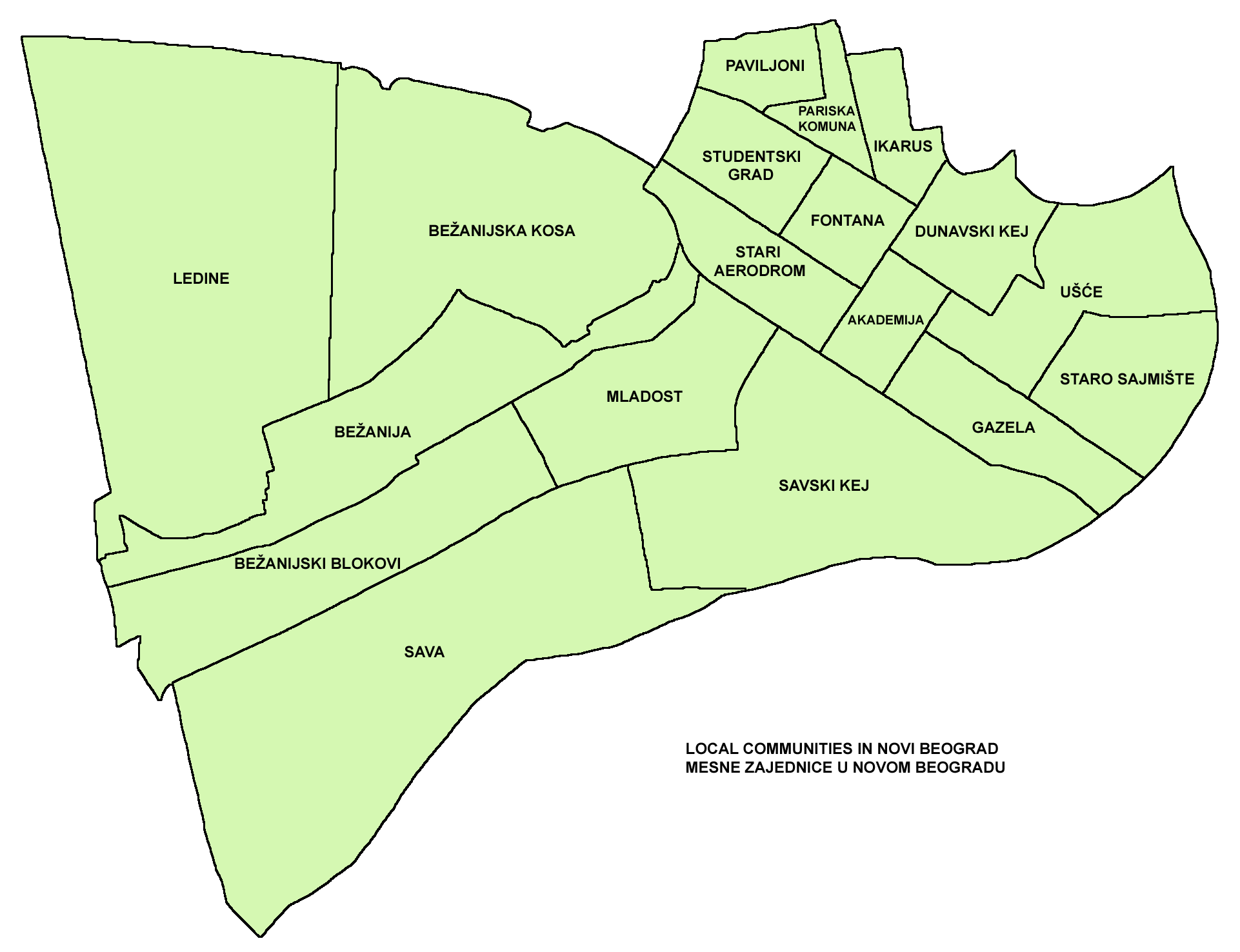
Map of Local communities in New Belgrade

=== Characteristics ===
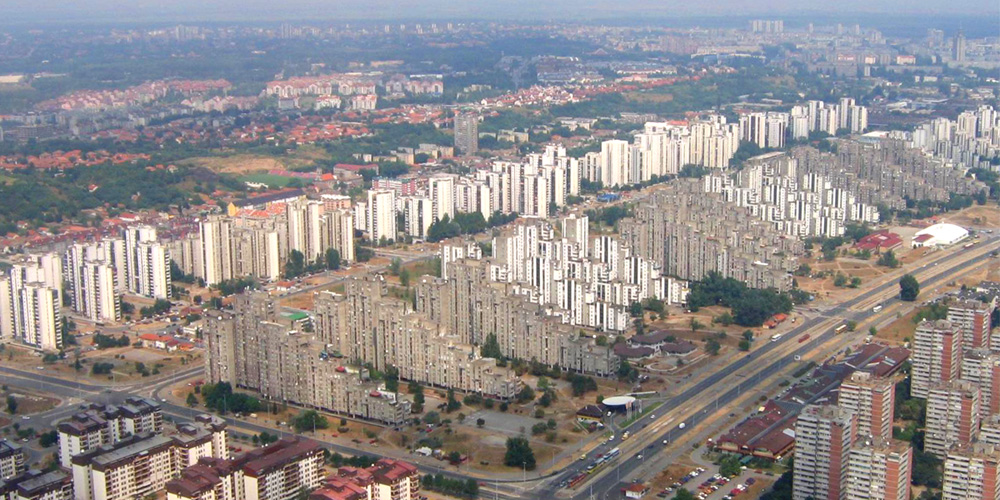
Bežanijski blokovi

Bežanijski blokovi (Serbian Cyrillic: Бежанијски блокови, lit. 'Bežanija Blocks') are built on the southernmost uninhabited area of the former Bežanija village, thus the name. However, it is completely urbanized and even though different architecturally from the southern section, it also features a series of residential skyscrapers in two parallel rows, stretching through the blocks 61, 62, 63 and the western section of 64. There are over 50 skyscrapers altogether (22 parallel ones with several additional in between).

Bežanijski blokovi are also known as "Oficirski blokovi" (Serbian Cyrillic: Официрски блокови, lit. 'Officers' Blocks'), since a large portion of the apartments in the buildings were owned by the old Yugoslav army, which housed its personnel there. Consequently, a large portion of the inhabitants of the Bežanijski blokovi are the families of the retired army officers who bought out their apartments from the Army.

Southern border marks the Jurija Gagarina street while the northern, separating it from Bežanija is the Vojvođanska street. In between, the Dušana Vukasovića street divides Blocks 61 and 62, the Nehruova street Blocks 62 and 63 and the Gandijeva street divides Blocks 63 and 64.

"Park of the Republic of Argentina" is located in Block 62. It has a proper rectangular shape and is bounded by the streets of Dušana Vukasovića on the west, Japanska on the north and Evropska on the south. It was called "Park Block 62" until 15 June 2017 when it was officially renamed to Park of Argentina. It was named in honor of the park in the Belgrade street in the capital of Argentina, Buenos Aires, Plazoleta Andrés Chazarreta. The park, formed in 2009, was renovated in October 2017 when it was announced that Buenos Aires will get a park named after Republic of Serbia. Plaza Republica de Serbia was ceremonially open in Buenos Aires on 23 November 2017, and it contains a mural with painted motifs from Belgrade and Serbia.

At the roundabout on the corner of Vojvođanska, Surčinska, Vinogradska and Dr Ivana Ribara streets, an obelisk was erected in 2012 to celebrate the 500 years of the first mention of Bežanija. It is 500 cm (200 in) tall, one centimeter for each year. Construction of the 7.9 km (4.9 mi) long, New Belgrade's direct connection to the Obrenovac-Surčin Bridge and Miloš the Great Motorway began on 31 March 2021, starting from the roundabout. Originally planned to be finished in September 2022, the road was opened on 1 April 2023.

In August 2023 demolition of the Ekstra Mall in the eastern section of the Block 64 was announced. Instead of the ground-floor mall, six buildings with 7 and 8 floors will be built.

=== Economy and transportation ===
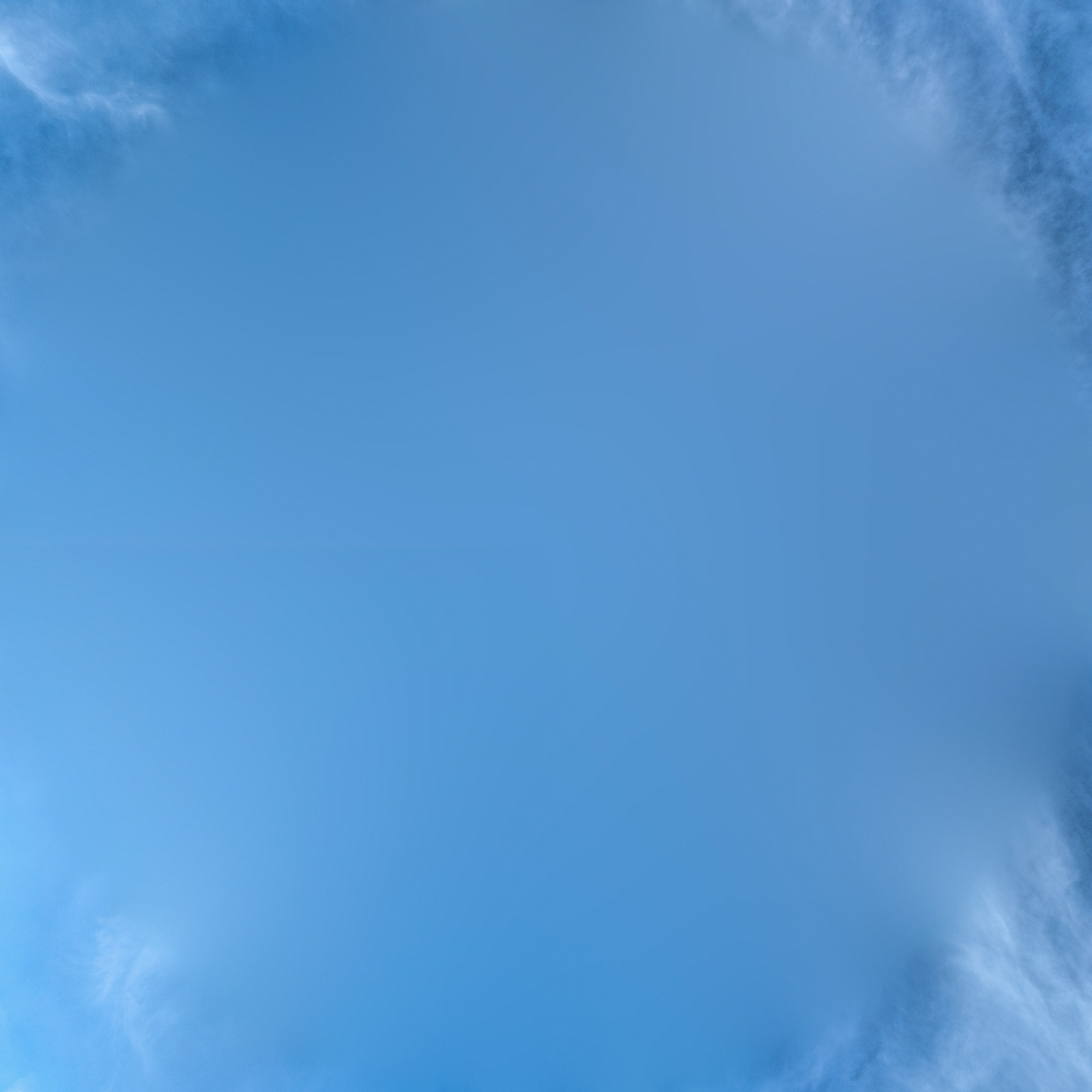
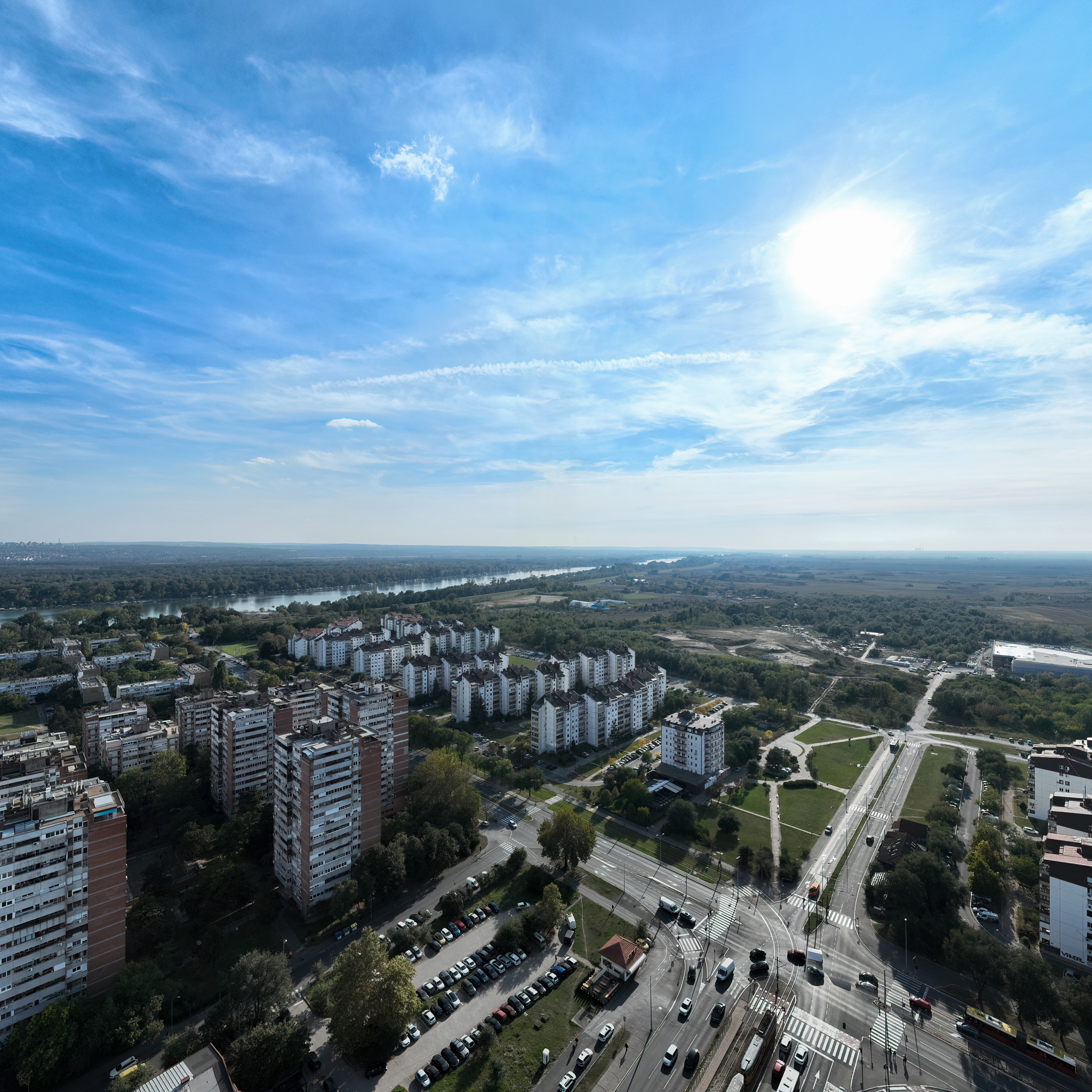
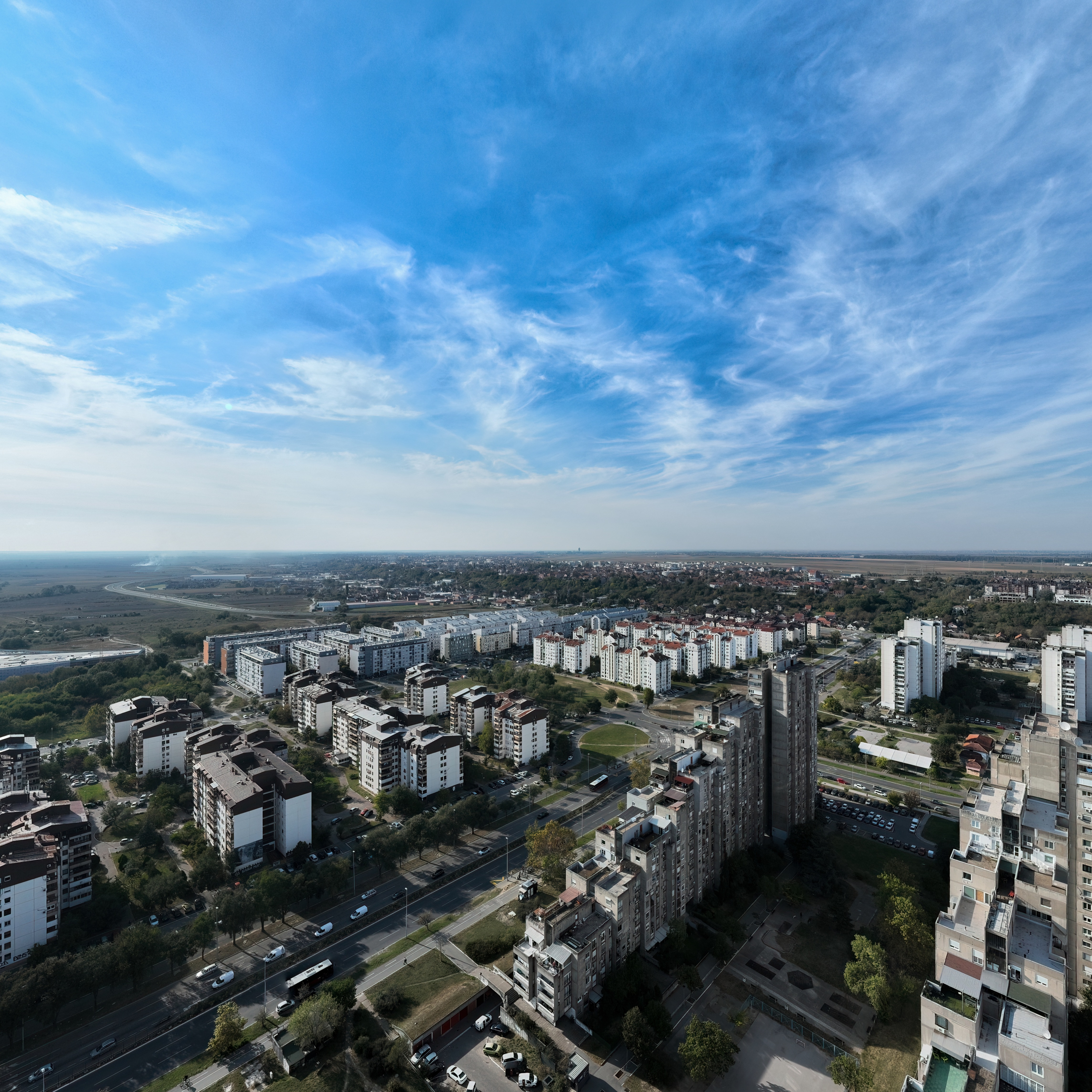
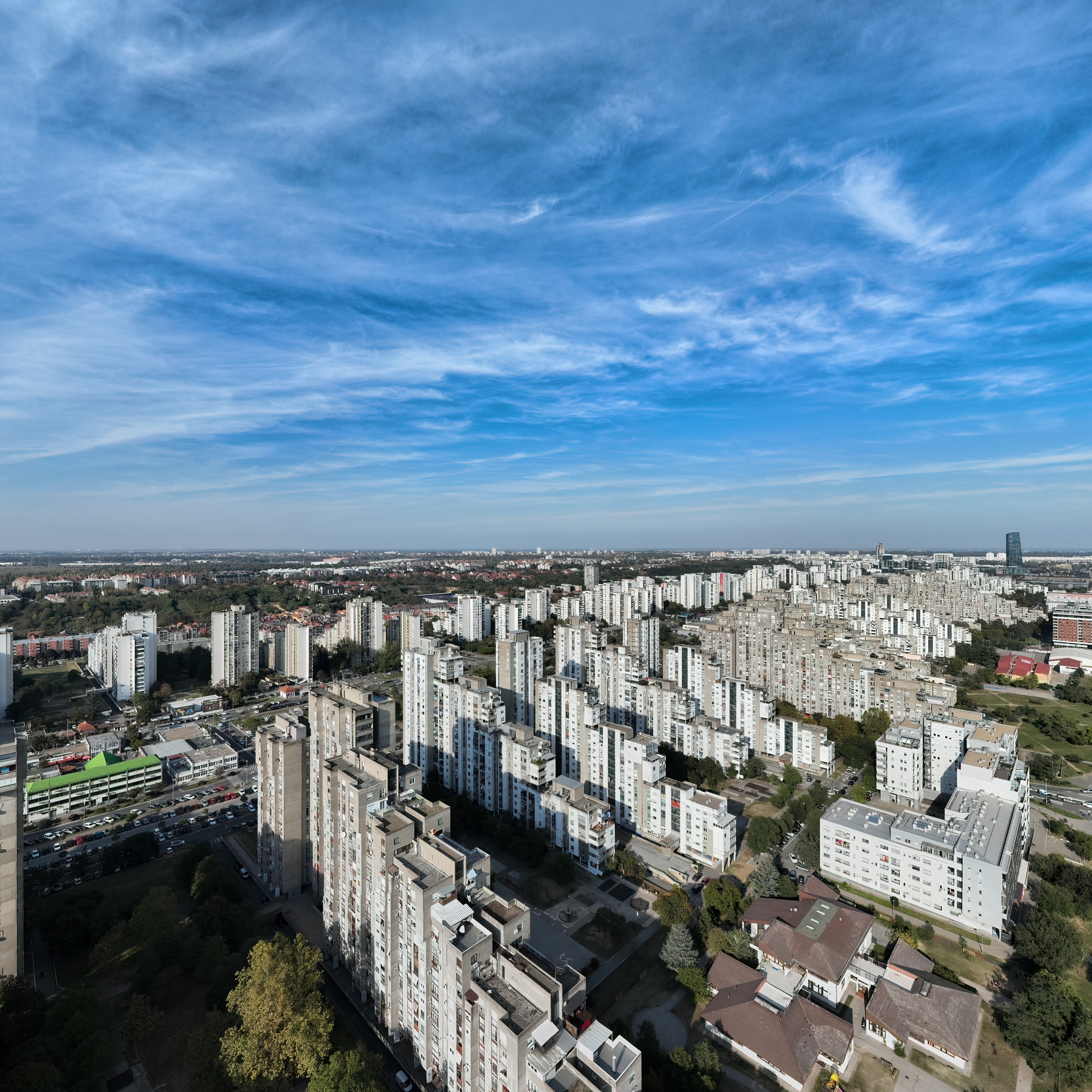
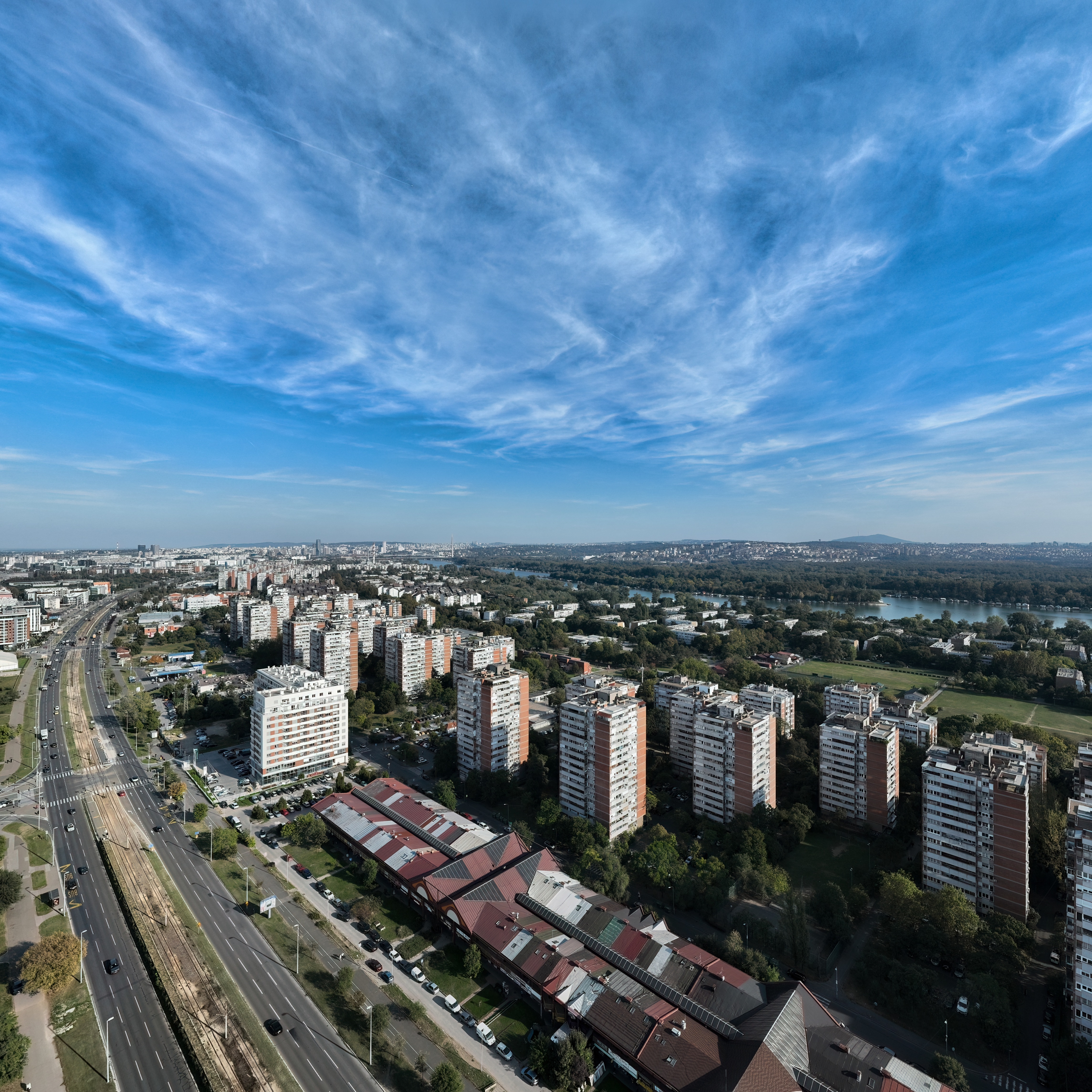
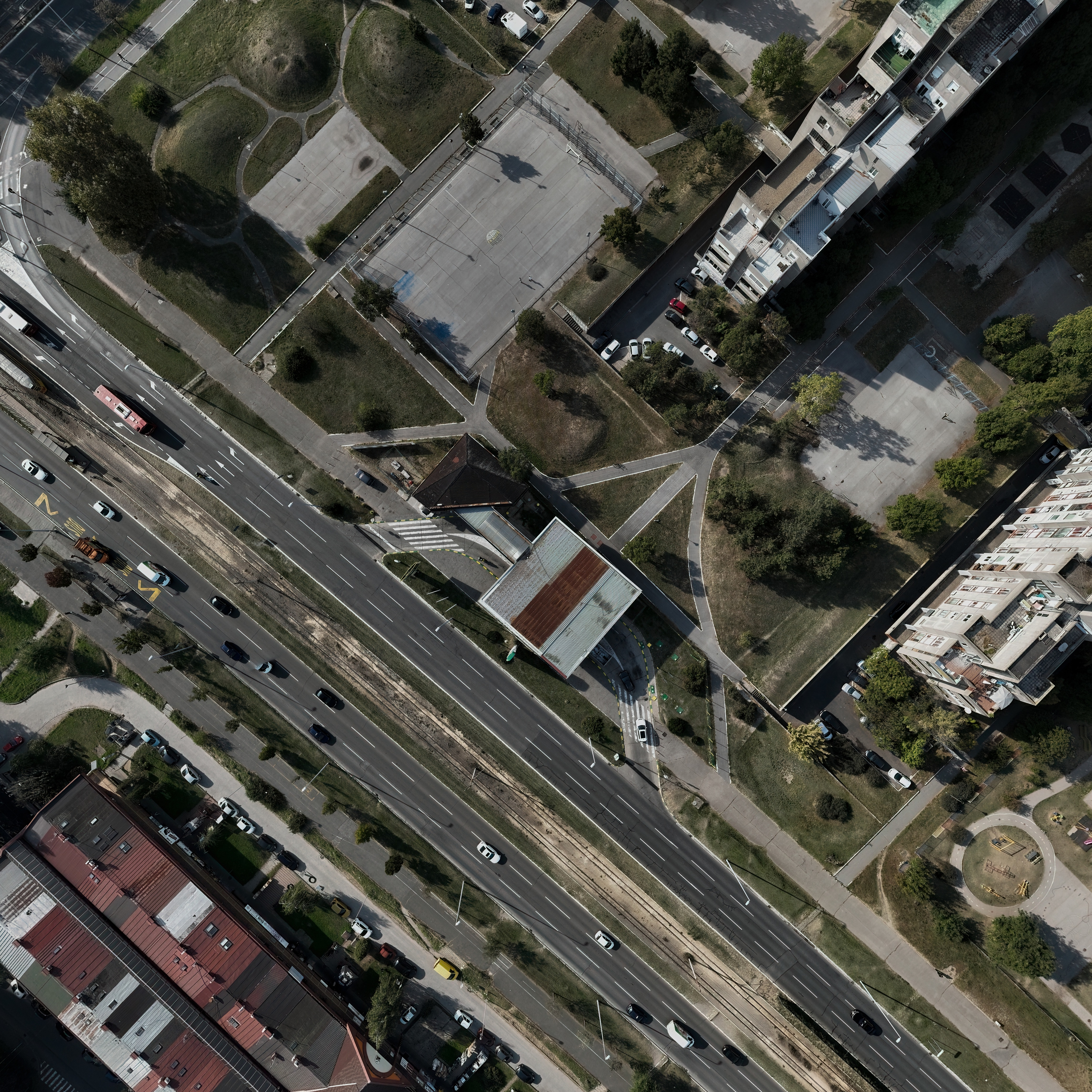
Panoramic view

Despite being constructed as a continuation of the highly industrialized central section of New Belgrade from the east (heavy industry like IMT, Minel, FOB-FOM, etc.), the neighborhood is entirely residential with commercial facilities developing only recently. Major commercial and social facilities include:

- Block 61: a kindergarten, a gas station Sunce (Serbian for sun) and a local community of Bežanijski blokovi
- Block 62: an ice skating rink with a gym and a primary school of Užička Republika, IDEA superstore, Technomarket consumer electronics store, Univerexport superstore and DM drogerie
- Block 63: Maxi superstore, gas station "Lav Petrol", tennis court, a primary school Jovan Sterija Popović, Orion Telekom headquarters
- Block 64: ImmoOutlet trade center, a primary school and a local community both under the name of Mladost (Serbian for youth)

In April 2018, Indian tractors factory TAFE purchased the bankrupt IMT tractors factory. IMT owns the vast industrial complex in the Block 64, but the TAFE didn't obtain the ownership on this land. The area, which covers 46 ha (110 acres), will be transformed into the commercial-residential complex. In October 2019, city announced that the complex, with the surrounding area (total of 72.7 ha (180 acres)), is planned for the residential-commercial neighborhood with buildings up to 12 floors and the possibility of settling 18,000 new residents. The problem makes the land directly occupied by the former factory as the soil is contaminated after the decades long engine and tractors production. Though the project was later reduced to 47.8 ha (118 acres) and planned population of 15,000, it gained notoriety as one of the worst examples of "investors' urbanism", since there is not one park, cultural building or green area in the project.

In addition to other bus lines, additional lines passing through or around the neighborhood are 89, 94, 95 (right through the middle), 45, 71, 72, 82, 601, 602 and 610.

== Population ==
Population of the local communities within the neighborhood was 89,561 by the census of 2002, out of which 44,505 in Bežanija and 45,056 in Sava section. Due to the major changes in the boundaries of the local communities in parts of New Belgrade, at the census of 2011, combined population was 79,310 (Bežanija 39,418, Sava 39,892).

== Neighbourhood culture and public image ==
Blokovi inhabitants represent a cross-section of the Serbian population. Because most people in Blokovi received their apartments through government-funded social programs, the population is very socio-economically mixed: it is not uncommon to have a bus driver living next door to a neurosurgeon in the same apartment block.

The blocks near the Sava river, especially the four and two-story buildings, were inhabited by a large number of artists and intellectuals in the 1970s. The neighbourhood is ideal for young children, with many playgrounds and a popular boardwalk built along Sava's left bank. It is also considered as a healthy and a quiet place to live in as it has a lot of green areas, sports terrains and also a bicycle trail alongside the river.

On the other hand, the officer blocks, and their grayness and drabness have earned Blokovi the reputation of some sort of urban ghetto during the 90s. This image was perpetuated by recent Serbian movies such as Rane, Apsolutnih sto, Jedan na jedan, Sutra ujutro, and Sedam i po.

However, recently the erection of Delta City shopping mall, plans for Aquapark and Tennis courts near Block 45 have doubled the value of real estate in this area, at the time when New Belgrade with numerous development plans becomes one of the more desirable parts of the city.

The well-known Yugoslav rock band Riblja Čorba has made a song with the title Neću da živim u Bloku 65 ("I don't want to live in Block 65"), which can be found on the CD Buvlja pijaca released in 1982.

Also, a grunge band from Belgrade's Block 19a, named Euforia, has a song called Blokovi.

== Streets ==
- Yuri Gagarin Street

== Sources ==
- Beograd - plan grada; M@gic M@p, 2006; ISBN 86-83501-53-1
