= Belville, Belgrade =

Belville Белвил Belvil
- Residential block
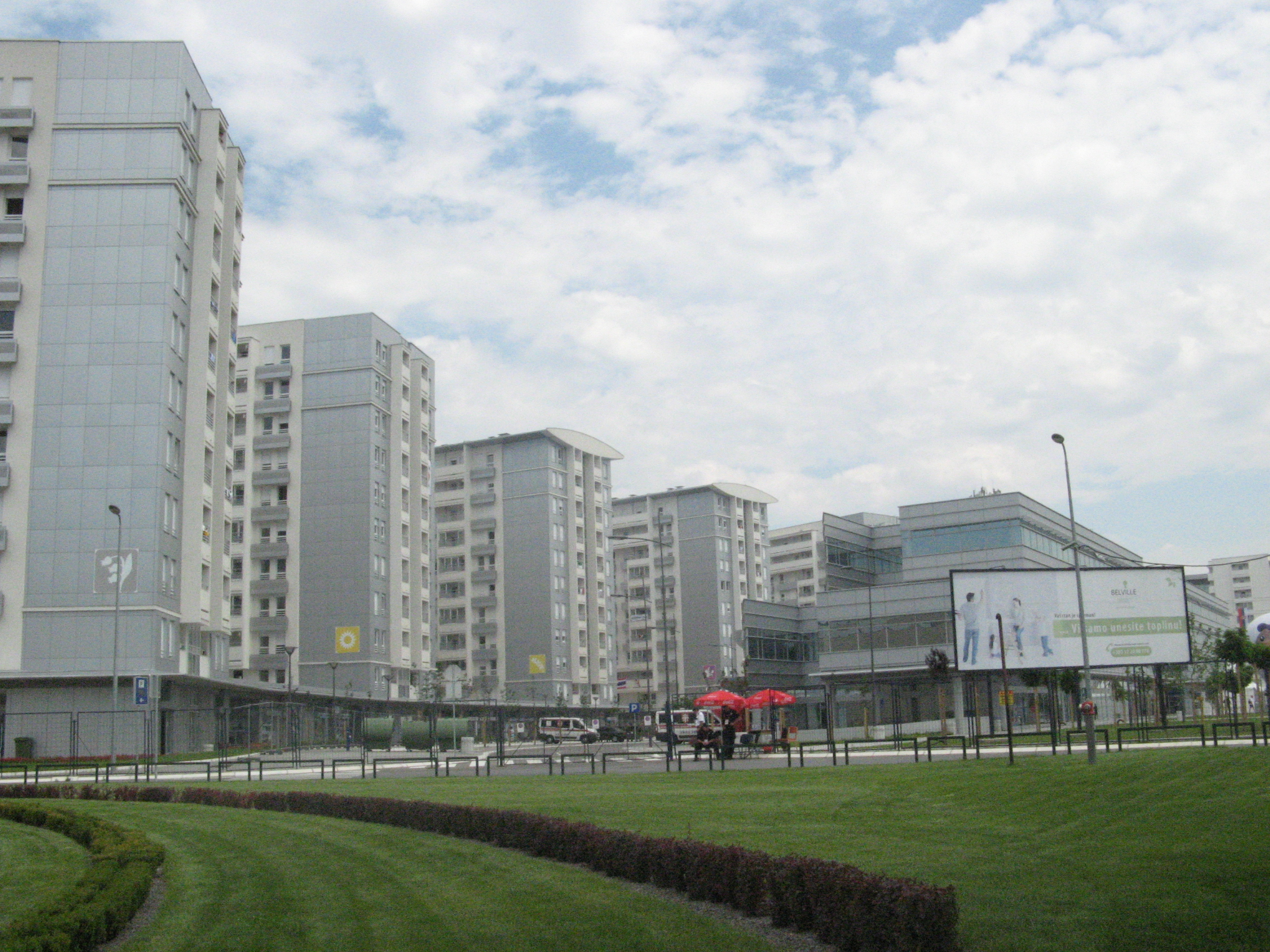
- Belville in July 2009.

- Location within Belgrade
- Coordinates: 44°48′22″N 20°24′24″E
- Country: Serbia
- Region: Belgrade
- Municipality: New Belgrade
- Established: 2006; 20 years ago

Area
  - Total: 138 ha (340 acres)
- Time zone: UTC+1 (CET)
  - Summer (DST): UTC+2 (CEST)
- Area code: +381(0)11
- Car plates: BG
- Website: www.belville.rs

Belville (Serbian: Белвил, romanized: Belvil; or University Village, Serbian: Универзитетско Село, romanized: Univerzitetsko Selo) is a residential area within Block 67 (Serbian: Блок 67, romanized: Blok 67) in New Belgrade. It is the first officially planned neighbourhood of Belgrade in 12 years; the project was started in 2006, and the apartments were used by participants of the 2009 Summer Universiade in Belgrade. The complex consists of 14 residential buildings and 2 commercial buildings, and more than 300 stores, a sales pavilion and a large parking space, covering a total area of 13.8 hectares. The construction investor is the company "Block 67 Associates".

== Name ==
Belville, which means "beautiful city" in French, is a common name of residential quarters in France, Canada and the United States.

== Location ==
Belville is located within Block 67, in New Belgrade. It is bounded by the following streets: Yuri Gagarin Street, Agostinho Neto Street, Đorđe Stanojević Street and Spanish Fighters Street.

== Residential complex ==
Belville covers an area of over 14 hectares and consists of 14 residential buildings and two buildings with office space containing 1,858 apartments of 27 different sizes and areas between 31 and 104 m^{2}, and 333 shops on the ground floor of residential buildings. The underground parking garage and parking place provide parking space for more than 1,300 cars. Besides, there is outdoor parking space for more than 600 cars. There are two elevators for underground garages in each building.

Investor of the Belville construction is the company Block 67 Associates, whose founders are Delta Real Estate and Hypo Alpe-Adria-Bank a.d.. The authors of the architectural project are Milutin Gec and Marija Gec ("Archi. Tim GM"), while the other projects were entrusted to Mašinoprojekt. The project management and supervision was done by the company Mace doo, founded by the Mace Group. Construction works were performed by the companies Deneza M, Montera, GK Kocic, Eksing, Grading, Gredina, Ratko Mitrovic Dedinje and Integral Banja Luka.

The project was started in August 2006, and the construction began in June 2007. The keys to apartments that accommodated the Universiade participants were given in March 2009. Keys were first given to apartment owners on December 8, 2009.

Delta City shopping mall is in the vicinity of the complex. Each of the residential buildings, ranging in size from 10 to 13 floors, is named after a type of flower: Rose, Tulip, Lily, Lilac, Hyacinth, Cyclamen, Wallflower, Lily of the valley, Sunflower, Mimosa, Violet, Dandelion, Calendula and Iris.

== Characteristics ==
The "University Village" was planned for use by the participants in the 2009 Summer Universiade in Belgrade. The project was started in August 2006, construction began in June 2007, and in March 2009 the first apartments were ready to be used by participants in the 2009 Summer Universiade. The keys to the first apartments were delivered to their owners on December 8, 2009.

The neighborhood has three zones: residential, international and free zone. It covers 140,000 square metres and has 2,100 condos that were used by 9,000 sportsmen. Also built within the complex are a computer center, two 10-storeys business towers, a post office, underground garages, hair and beauty salons, a trim trail, etc.

The city government plans to make the University Village a fully functional residential neighborhood for 6,000 inhabitants after the Universiade, so from 2009 new schools, kindergarten, retirement homes, etc. are planned to be built too.

The northeastern corner of the block remained undeveloped. In January-May 2020, it was adapted into the outdoor parking lot "Belville" with over 420 spaces.

== Universiade 2009 ==
During the 25th Summer Universiade 2009, which was held in Belgrade from 1 until 12 July 2009, the Belville complex accommodated almost 9,000 athletes from 145 countries. The Universiade was officially opened in the Arena Belgrade, and sports competitions were held in Zemun, Pancevo, Obrenovac, Novi Sad, Smederevo and Vrsac. Belville was officially opened as a university village on June 24, 2009.

== Romville ==
Part of the terrain on which the Belville was to be built, was a Romani informal settlement. They were moved to an empty lot just west of Belville. In the next years, the settlement grew, becoming the one with the worst living conditions in the town: no electricity, no water, rats infestation, etc. Inhabitants were constantly illegally tapping on the electricity lines, from any source possible: street lights, traffic signs, neighboring railway facilities, etc., using cables without an insulation dragged through the water. Out of 366 children of the school age, even though it is mandatory by the law, only 20 of them were pupils. It was colloquially named Romville (Rom[ani]+[Bel]ville). The settlement was also partially obstructing the construction of the access roads to the newly built Ada Bridge. City tried to relocate the settlers but they refused, gaining support from some NGO’s. After a long stalemate, the city forcefully, using the police, first counted the settlers and then relocated them all, 974 persons, in one day, 26 April 2012. City employed 450 communal workers and 110 buses which relocated the inhabitants to Makiš, Jabučki Rit, Resnik, Dren, Barajevo and Kijevo. Despite the previous skirmish between the settlers and the representatives of the city, the relocation itself was without incident, closely watched by the local inspections and the representatives of the international human rights institutions. At their destinations, some of the settlers were provided with shipping container houses with running water and electricity.

Others were sent back to the town or city in Serbia where they had a registered address, without provision for adequate alternative accommodation. One group of Roma who were sent back to Niš were relocated in an abandoned warehouse without access to water, sanitation or electricity. In June 2020, two Roma forced to live here were awarded more than €2,600 each (plus interest) in compensation by the Belgrade Court of Appeal after they brought a court case against the Republic of Serbia, the City of Belgrade and the City of Niš for discrimination.
