= Savski Nasip =

Savski Nasip Савски Насип
- Urban neighbourhood
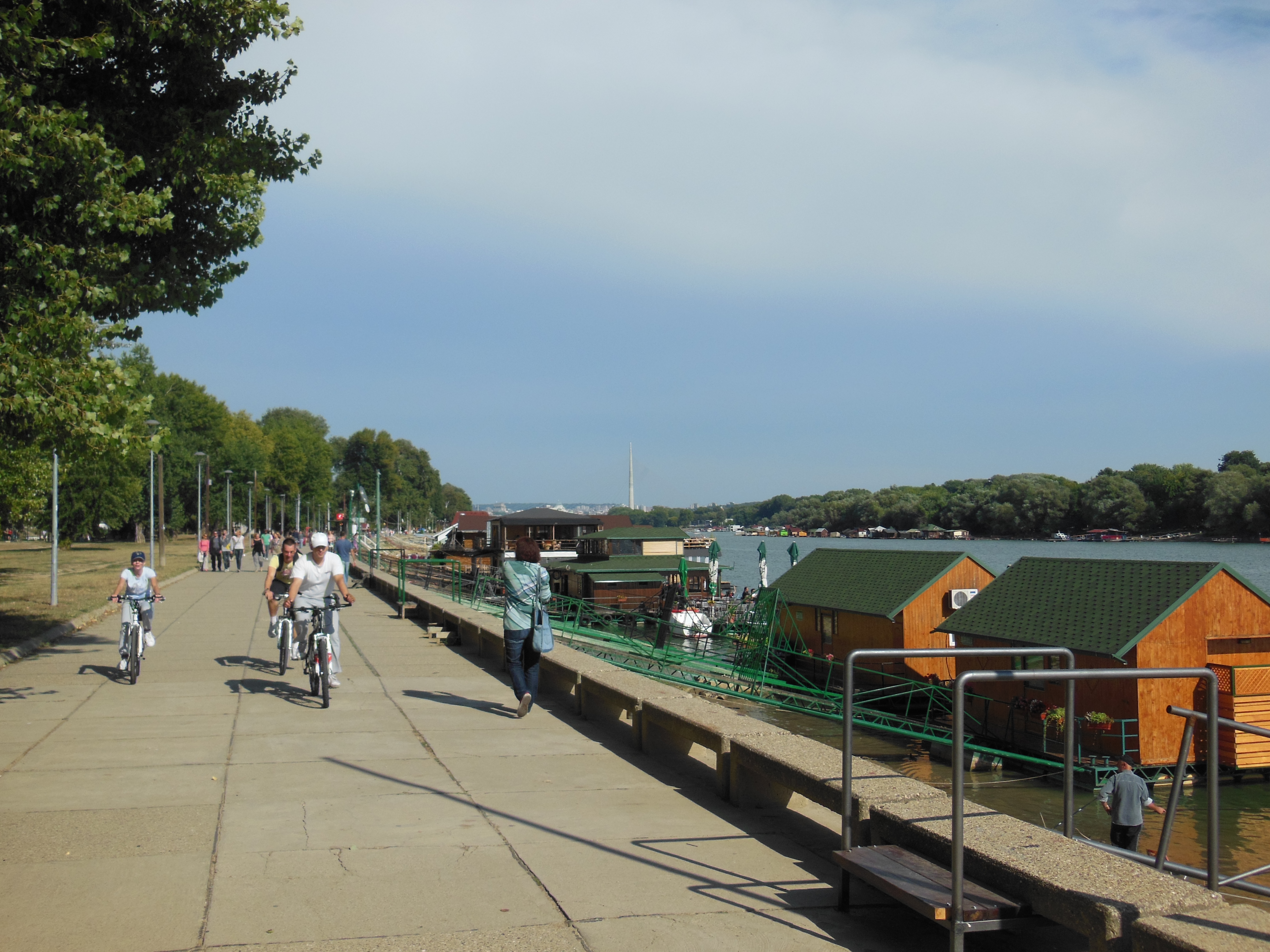
- Sava Quay, central section of the Savski Nasip, in 2013
- Etymology: Sava embankment
- Location within Belgrade
- Coordinates: 44.801017°N 20.417495°E
- Country: Serbia
- Region: Belgrade
- Municipality: New Belgrade

Area
  - Total: 4.14 km^{2} (1.60 sq mi)
- Time zone: UTC+1 (CET)
  - Summer (DST): UTC+2 (CEST)
- Area code: +381(0)11
- Car plates: BG

Savski Nasip (Serbian: Савски Насип) is an urban neighborhood of Belgrade, the capital of Serbia. It is located in Belgrade's municipality of Novi Beograd. In wider sense, the term is used for the entire left bank of the Sava on the territory of the New Belgrade, which is partially being arranged as the pedestrian "Sava quay" (Savski kej). Since the early 2010s, the term was colloquially attached to the westernmost section of the bank, the riparian zone which is threatened by the illegal construction of weekend houses in the forbidden zone.

== Location ==
Savski Nasip covers an area of the western part of the Block 18-a and eastern part of the Block 69, located between Savski nasip street to the north and the Sava river to the south. The old and new railway bridges pass above the neighborhood. Savski Nasip is located across the complex of the Belgrade Fair on the opposite bank of the Sava. It also encompasses the peninsula of Mala Ciganlija and the bay of Zimovnik.

== Sections ==
=== Savski Nasip industrial area ===
Savski Nasip is entirely industrial area, beginning with the dockyard facilities of the Belgrade dockyard on the west, through the whole cluster of construction, gravel selling and treatment companies (Brodoremont, Rad, Mostogradnja, Partizanski put, Crna Trava, Inkop, Gemax). Heating plant "Novi Beograd" is also located in the neighborhood. Ada Bridge, opened for traffic in 2012, crosses over the eastern section of the neighborhood.

The shipyard, once named Marshal Tito, being the pride of the former Yugoslav socialist economy, is now completely defunct. The shipyard hangars are now used as a storage space, currently owned by a prominent cargo transportation company Milšped. The space is rented to many other international trade companies, including Gatarić, Mercedes Benz and Porsche.

The name of the neighborhood, Savski nasip, simply means the Sava embankment. During the high levels of the Sava waters, the area is flooded, which affects the operation of the gravel treatment companies.

"Belgrade Power Plants" complex is located in this section, which includes the New Belgrade heating plant. The complex was bombed on 4 April 1999 during the NATO bombing of Yugoslavia with multiple missiles, causing explosions and power outage in the majority of the city. Worker Slobodan Trišić was killed in the explosion of the mazut reservoir. There is a Trišić's memorial within the complex.

=== Sava Quay ===
Prior to 1968, the land along the river was a thick forest while the inland was a swamp which was drained and filled with sand. The area was known for its wildlife, especially the water birds. The residential complexes were built from 1968 to 1972, when the first tenants moved in. The block was fully settled in 1973 and 1974, when the 2.2 km (1.4 mi) long promenade along the bank was finished, too.

By the late 2010s, the quay became synonymous for the "ravaging of the investors". Disregarding laws and regulation, they crammed floating restaurant-barges (splavovi) clogging the river bank and obstructing the view on the river, concreted green areas, ruined the promenade with heavy equipment and machinery, illegally connected to communal systems and drilled the embankment wherever they liked. Citizens organized in groups against this, organized petitions, protests and traffic blockades, but the authorities (municipal, city, state) refused to intervene for years. In July 2020, along the 2 km (1.2 mi) long promenade, there were 89 barges, which blocked 80% of the river's bank. According to the official regulations, one barge can't be longer than 30 m (98 ft) and the distance between them must be 15 m (49 ft), which gives a total of no more than 45 barges.

In March 2020, it was announced that the construction of the first pedestrian-cyclist bridge in Belgrade will commence in 2021. It will connect New Belgrade with the island of Ada Ciganlija across the Sava, as the continuation of the Omladinskih Brigada street in Block 70. Public, partially underground garage with 300 parking spots will be built at the end of the street. This is the second part of the project city administration alleged is the result of citizens' online voting (first part is relocation of the Old Sava Bridge on dry land, in the Park Ušće to become an "attraction"). Reporters and public distanced from the voting or debunked it as being rigged.

Citizens also protested because of the project, as it anticipates the cutting of the forested area and linden tree avenues along the street, planted by 1974, in order to build the parking lot and the access to the bridge. Also, the expanded street and parking lot will increase the traffic which is described as 'unbearable" as it is. Some architects and urbanists supported the notion of blocking the projects, as it was envisioned on the New Belgrade side.

In November 2022, new mayor Aleksandar Šapić announced that by the early 2023, he will bring the order to the quay and number barges, whose number by this time reached almost 100. Instead, only 30 are planned to remain. Concurrently, arrangement of the quay itself was announced, which, mayor announced, will by 2025 be "more beautiful than the promenade in Belgrade Waterfront". In December 2022, at the bidding for the locations, 28 barges were leased.

With several neighboring residential blocks of New Belgrade, Savski Nasip forms a sub-municipal administrative local community of Savski Kej ("Sava quay"). It had a population of 7,560 in 1991 and 7,161 in 2002. It was later merged with the local community of Block 70 but the new local community preserved the Sava quay name and had a population of 20,993 in 2011.

=== Savski Nasip riparian zone ===
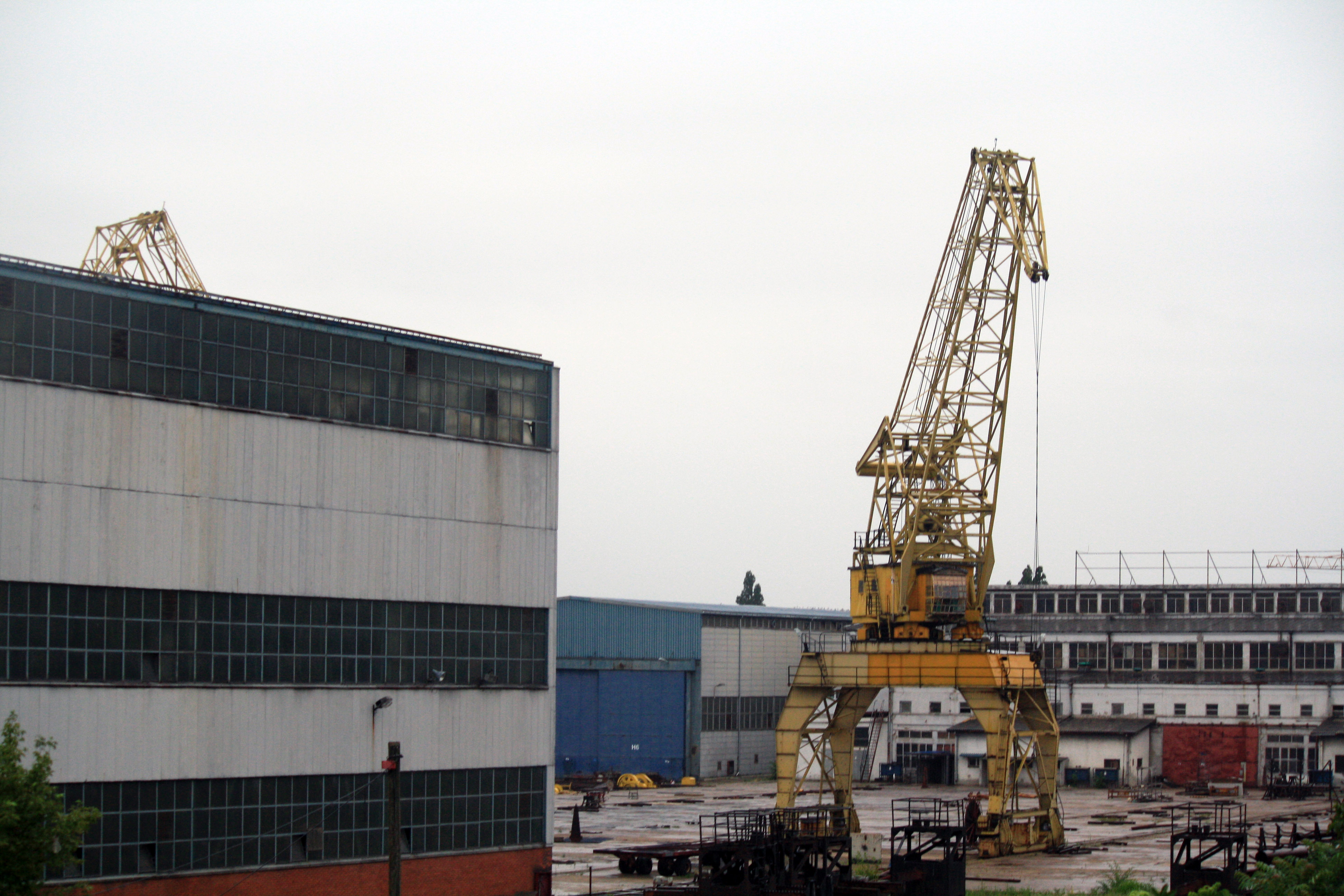
Shipyard in the eastern, industrial section

A zone in the southwestern extension of New Belgrade, west of the Blocks 45 (Sava Blocks neighborhood) and 72 (Dr Ivan Ribar neighborhood). It is on the opposite side of the municipality from the neighborhood of the same name and makes a continuation of the Sava quay, extending into the municipality of Surčin. Lower green riparian zone is below the higher embankment with a pedestrian and bicycle path on its crown. Any construction in the zone is explicitly banned and the embankment road is allowed only for the cars with special permits (locals who have arable land in the area behind the embankment), while use of trucks and heavy equipment is also banned. The forests which developed along the bank covered 9.1 ha (22 acres) by 2010.

The embankment was built concurrently with the Iron Gate I Hydroelectric Power Station, which was finished in 1972, and was based on the highest water level in the Danube, to which Sava flows in shortly after this zone. The Danube's level was primary point as when the level of the Danube is high, it lifts the level in the Sava, too. Since then, the embankments were getting higher in all the upstream countries of the Danube's watershed, hence worsening the high level regime of the waters in the river because as the embankments gets higher, the water during the high levels is lifted also: the tidal waves are bigger, stronger and with the larger destructive power.

Since the early 2000s, Belgrade plutocracy began building summer houses on the bank, in the protected zone despite the ban. Originally those were smaller, wooden houses but in time, as there was no official reaction, the construction of the proper multi-floor houses and villas with private peers on the river began. Owners of the villas include politicians, judges, managers of the state owned companies and known criminals. Use of heavy building machinery and trucks deteriorated the embankment itself, while the forests in the riparian zone were cut in order to fill the building ground with additional earth and gravel. That way, the riparian zone was elevated, stultifying its existence, as the area ready to accept the excess waters during floods was reduced. Another problem caused by the houses is possible contamination of 16 Ranney collectors in this area, which are part of Belgrade's water supply system. The houses also physically obstruct access to the wells for the communal services. None of the floods that hit Serbia since then, including the massive 2009 European floods and 2014 Southeast Europe floods, prompted authorities to stop the destruction of the zone. Dragan Đilas, mayor of Belgrade 2008-13, publicly stated that city has no money to tangle the problem, thus allowing the continued construction.

After the 2012 elections and the political change, it turned out that some of the highest officials of the new political elite have villas on the Savski Nasip, including the President of Serbia Tomislav Nikolić, his sons and his son's father-in-law, government minister and ambassador Milan Bačević. The Minister for Construction until 2014, Velimir Ilić publicly refused to demolish the illegal houses, saying that everything should be legalized. His successor, Zorana Mihajlović, addressed the issue several times, but didn't say or do anything to fix the problem. She was always talking about the legalization of the houses, like Ilić, but the law says that the constructions in the forbidden zone can't be legalized at all. Number of houses, in New Belgrade section only, grew to over 120 by 2017, so the path on the embankment was de facto turned into the street. That caused frequent clashes with the pedestrians, joggers and bicyclists as the majority of the proprietors of the illegal houses are wealthy and drive too fast over the embankment in powerful cars and SUVs. Since 2016, citizens began to gather at the entry point, protesting and blocking the illegal traffic. Protesters organized in several associations ("Streets for the bicyclists", "Savski Nasip") and even though the protests became regular, neither the city or state authorities have done anything to solve even the path problem, instead it appears as if they are enabling it. Serbian Academy of the engineering sciences issued a warning in November 2017 saying that the usurpation of the riparian zones is widespread in Serbia, but that Belgrade is the most endangered. They stated that construction is against several legislative acts (Spatial plan of Serbia, Law on waters, Criminal Law of Serbia) and described it as something "unheard in the civilized world". They pointed out that the "terrifying irresponsible destruction" is also colliding with the European Union floods directive which is binding for Serbia even though it is not an EU member and pleaded the state saying that costs of the protection are way less than the costs of damage repair after the floods.

The settlement also became unofficially known as Sojenice ("stilt houses"). As of April 2017, houses are still being built and the illegal proprietors even paved the access roads so that they can easily reach their summer houses. Minister Mihajlović stated that if the case of paving the embankment road is a matter for the state, the government will react. In May 2017 president of the municipality of New Belgrade Aleksandar Šapić announced his candidacy for the mayor of Belgrade. Immediately a smear campaign against him, headed by the city manager Goran Vesić began, including a matter of an illegal object in the neighborhood of Studentski Grad, built by Šapić's uncle. Vesić also mentioned a house of Šapić's uncle on Savski Nasip, which prompted Šapić to publicly announce that the municipality will demolish all 120 objects, even though it was the city administration which was dragging out with the proper documentation for the demolition. A group of 23, mostly abandoned objects, was demolished from 6 to 12 June 2017.

Minister for the environmental protection, Goran Trivan, stated in January 2018 that building in the zones of protection is inadmissible and that the best solution would be to demolish everything that was built. He added that there are certain modern technologies which could be applied to protect the water extracting Ranney collectors, but that it is way too expensive. However, further undisturbed construction and degradation of the embankment continued, so as the continuous citizens' protests and calls for demolition of the built structures which compromise the embankment, including obstructions of the road on the embankment, and blocking of the heavy construction vehicles passing by, as they are not allowed anyway.
