= Obrenovac-Surčin Bridge (A2 motorway) =

Bridge in Belgrade, Serbia

- Coordinates: 44.666060°N 20.246721°E
- Carries: 6 lanes of A2 motorway
- Crosses: Kolubara and Sava rivers
- Locale: Municipalities of Obrenovac and Surčin; City of Belgrade, Serbia
- Other name(s): Мост Обреновац-Сурчин; Most Obrenovac-Surčin
- Maintained by: Putevi Srbije

Characteristics
- Total length: 1.7 km (1.1 mi)

History
- Construction start: February 12, 2017; 9 years ago
- Opened: December 17, 2019; 6 years ago

Location
- Interactive map of Obrenovac-Surčin Bridge

The Obrenovac-Surčin Bridge on A2 motorway (Serbian: Мост Обреновац-Сурчин, romanized: Most Obrenovac-Surčin) is the bridge crossing the rivers Kolubara and Sava in the suburban section of Belgrade, the capital of Serbia. It is part of the A2 motorway, in Serbia more often called Corridor XI. Preparatory works on the bridge began on 12 February 2017 and it was ceremonially opened, with the adjoining Obrenovac-Surčin section of the motorway, on 17 December 2019.

== Location ==
On Obrenovac side, the bridge is located west of the town itself and just north of Barič. On Surčin side, it crosses into the uninhabited area of Boljevci, southeast of the village.

== Construction ==
Preparatory works began on 12 February 2017. Ceremony marking the official beginning of the construction, attended by the Minister of Construction, Zorana Mihajlović, was held on 23 May 2017. The construction of the 17.6 km (10.9 mi) long Surčin-Obrenovac section of the A2 motorway began on 1 March 2017, and both the motorway and the bridge, should be finished by the end of 2019.

By August 2017 all 252 piles projected on the ground section were finished and the construction of the piles for the main beam across the Sava, from the Obrenovac direction, began. Construction of the body of the bridge should began by the end of 2017.

In October 2018 it was announced that the bridge will be open for the pedestrians in April–May 2019. The opening of the completely finished bridge was set for 5 January 2020. It was also stated that the Surčin-Obrenovac motorway itself, without which the bridge has no purpose, will be finished by the end of 2020 or early 2021, and not at the beginning of 2020, as previously stated. Beginning of the construction of the final, 9 km (5.6 mi) long Surčin-New Belgrade section, which will connect the motorway and the bridge directly with Belgrade, was announced for 2019. Works didn't start, and in December 2020, the beginning of the works was announced for March 2021.

The construction company which builds the bridge is the CCCC, China Communications Construction.

In August 2019, section of the A2 motorway below Obrenovac was opened for traffic and named "Miloš Veliki". Section of the motorway which should connect the bridge to it, on both sides, wasn't finished and after numerous changes it was announced that the new price will be €9 million per km, which is deemed way to much by the experts, as the road is being constructed in the low, flat, non-urbanized area. As the access to the opened section of the motorway from the Belgrade direction wasn't done properly, this caused traffic collapses and 10 km (6.2 mi) long traffic jams. Authorities claim that the traffic will be relieved when the remaining part of the motorway, including the bridge, will be finished and functional, by the end of 2019.

The bridge was ceremonially opened on 17 December 2019, jointly with the adjoining section of the Obrenovac-Surčin motorway. That way, the bridge was connected with the motorways on both sides. Despite the claims that the construction of the access roads was without any problems, the fact that the terrain was easy for the construction and that work was finished almost a month before deadline, the total price of the bridge motorway grew to €12 million per km in the end.

The direct connection to New Belgrade finally began on 31 March 2021. The 7.9 km (4.9 mi) long "motorway which will not be a classical motorway" with reduced speed to 80 km/h (50 mph) was to be finished in September 2022, but was opened on 1 April 2023. Despite easy terrain, the total cost remained high, $70.5 million, or $9 million per kilometer due to the claimed "specific thoroughfare" which needed "special technology of construction".

== Characteristics ==
The length of the bridge, which spans two rivers, Kolubara (near its mouth into the Sava) and Sava, was variously reported as 1,581 m (5,187 ft), 1,700 m (5,600 ft) and 1.800 m (5 ft 10.9 in). 84,000 m^{3} (3,000,000 cu ft) of concrete will be built into the bridge.
