= Timeline of Belgrade =

History of Belgrade, Serbia

The following is a timeline of the history of Belgrade, the capital of Serbia.

== Timeline ==
=== Early years ===
Historical period	Events
Vinča culture	5400–4500 BCE: Vinča culture is born in what is today Belgrade's suburb of Vinča. Within the coming two millennia it evolves into a dominant neolithic culture in Europe, especially influencing the Balkans. Sometimes this era is called the First Golden Age of Belgrade. By 4500 BC Vinča culture disperses into several sub-cultures.
Barbarian invasions	700–279 BCE: Thraco-Dacians dwell in the region.; 279 BCE: Singidūn is founded by the Celtic tribe of Scordisci.

=== Early AD ===
Historical period	Events
Roman Empire	6 CE: Aulus Caecina Severus becomes the first governor of Moesia. Belgrade was known as Singidunum at this time, and Zemun was known as Taurunum and was part of Pannonia.; 86: Legio IV Flavia Felix, a Roman legion, is based in Singidunum, at present day Kalemegdan.; fl. 117–138: Roman Emperor Hadrian grants Singidunum municipium status.; 332: Roman Emperor Flavius Jovianus (r. 363–364) was born in Singidunum. He re-established Christianity as state religion.
Eastern Roman Empire	395: Singidunum becomes a northwestern frontier city of the Eastern Roman Empire after the death of Theodosius I (r. 379–395)
Iranian, Germanic, and Hunic invasions: 5th century	441: The Huns destroy the city. Attila resides in the city.; ?: The Sarmatians hold Singidunum.; 470: The Ostrogoths expel the Sarmatians.; 476: Western Roman Empire collapses. The city becomes a border-town towards the hostile Germanic tribes.; 488: The Gepids conquer Singidunum.; 504: The Goths capture it again.
Byzantine/Frankish rule and Slavic arrival: 6–9th centuries	510: A peace treaty handed over the city to the Byzantine Empire.; 535: Byzantine emperor Justinian I rebuilds Singidunum.; 584: The Avars conquer and sack it.; 592: Byzantine Empire regains the city.; 7th century: The Avars destroy it again.; 630: The Slavs conquer Singidunum.

=== 9th — 16th centuries ===
Historical period	Events
Byzantine, Bulgarian, and Hungarian rule: 9th–11th centuries	827: The First Bulgarian Empire control the fortress. The city is called by Western sources Alba Bulgarica.; Frankish Empire temporary annexes Taurunum, today's northern Belgrade.; 16 April 878: First known written record of the Slavic name Beligrad.; 896: Army of Hungarians attack Belgrade.; 1018: The Byzantine emperor Basil II seizes Belgrade from the Bulgarian Empire. Occasional clashes with Hungary.; 1071: Hungarians besiege and seize Belgrade from the Byzantine Empire.; 1072: Belgrade was briefly retaken by Byzantine Empire, but Hungarians again seize it still in that year.; 1096: The city was destroyed by Hungarians, but the Byzantine Empire remained in control of it.
Hungarian, Byzantine, and Bulgarian rule: 11th–12th centuries	1096–1189: The Crusaders are passing through Belgrade.; 1127: Hungarian king Stefan II destroys Belgrade and used the obtained stones to build a fortress in Zemun.; 1154: Byzantine emperor Manuel I Comnenus destroys Zemun and takes the stones back to rebuild Belgrade.; 1182: Hungary attack and sacked the city.; 1185: Byzantine Empire regained it by diplomacy but loses to the newly reestablished Bulgarian Empire.
Serbian, Hungarian, and Bulgarian rule: 13th century	1202: The Hungarians seize Belgrade.; 1203: The Bulgarians retake the city.; 1213: The city is given to Hungary by emperor Boril.; 1221: Belgrade is returned to Bulgaria.; 1246: The city becomes part of Hungary.; 1284: The Hungarians gift to the Serbian king Stefan Dragutin; this is the first time that Belgrade comes under Serbian rule.
Hungarian rule: 14th–16th centuries	1316: Stefan Milutin takes Belgrade from his brother by force.; 1319: The Hungarians deprive King Milutin of the city.; 1382: The troops of rebellious Croatian noblemen brothers Ivaniš Horvat and Pavao Horvat capture the city from Sigismund, Holy Roman Emperor.; 1386: Hungary regains it.; 1403: Sigismund, Holy Roman Emperor gives the city to Despot Stefan Lazarević for Despot Stefan's lifetime. Despot Stefan builds Belgrade Fortress anew and establishes Belgrade as the capital of the Serbian Despotate.; 19 July 1427: Despot Stefan dies. Hungary reclaims Belgrade from Đurađ Branković.; 1440: The Ottoman Empire attacks Belgrade. The city endures the siege following heavy destruction.; 1456: Siege of Belgrade (1456): Sultan Mehmed II besieges Belgrade but fails to capture it.

=== 16th — 19th centuries ===
Historical period	Events
Ottoman and Austrian rule: 16th–19th centuries	1521: Siege of Belgrade (1521): Sultan Suleiman the Magnificent conquers Belgrade.; 1688: Siege of Belgrade (1688): Duke Maximilian of Bavaria captures the city.; 1690: Siege of Belgrade (1690): the Ottomans capture Belgrade anew.; 1717: Siege of Belgrade (1717): Prince Eugene of Savoy captures the city (Prinz Eugen, der edle Ritter).; 1718: Belgrade becomes the capital of the Kingdom of Serbia, a Habsburg monarchy province.; 1720–1733: Charles Alexander, Duke of Württemberg is the autocratic governor of the Kingdom of Serbia.; 1723–1736: Construction of the Kalemegdan fortress by Nicolas Doxat de Démoret.; July–September 1739: Siege of Belgrade (1739).; 18 September 1739: The Treaty of Belgrade between Austria and the Ottomans returns Belgrade to the Ottoman Empire.; 1789: Siege of Belgrade (1789): Marshal Ernst Gideon von Laudon captures the city.; 4 August 1791: The Treaty of Sistova returns Belgrade to the Ottomans.; 1793: Hadji Mustafa Pasha becomes the Vizier of the Belgrade Pashaluk.; 15 December 1801: Kučuk-Alija murders Hadji Mustafa Pasha, marking the beginning of the renegade Janissary officers Dahije rule in Belgrade.
Ottoman and Serbian rule: 1804—1878	1804: Following the Slaughter of the Knezes, the Serbs organize themselves against the terror of the Dahije regime, marking the beginning of the First Serbian Uprising under the leadership of Karađorđe Petrović. Dahije leaders leave Belgrade, but are later captured and beheaded. The Ottomans reinstate their rule in Belgrade.; 1805: Serbs refuse to disarm, the first armed confrontations between Serbs and the official Ottoman forces take place.; 12 December [O.S. 30 November] 1806: Karađorđe Petrović captures Belgrade and makes it the capital of Serbia.; 1808: First Serbian Academy, the Great School, is established.; 1813: The Ottomans reconquer the city.; 1815: Miloš Obrenović started the Second Serbian Uprising and conquered Belgrade.; 1830: Mahmud II proclaimed charter on Serbian autonomy.; 1831: First printing works established.; 17 January [O.S. 5 January] 1834: The first newspaper (Novine srbske—"Serbian Newspaper") published.; 1840: The first post office in Belgrade.; 1841: Belgrade became the capital of the Principality of Serbia under Knez Mihailo Obrenović.; 1844: The National Museum of Serbia established.; 1855: First telegraph line in Serbia, Belgrade–Aleksinac, established.; 1862: After the Čukur Fountain incident, Belgrade was bombarded from the Kalemegdan fortress.; 1867: In Kalemegdan, the Ottoman commander of the fortress Ali Riza Pasha handed over the keys of Belgrade to Knez Mihailo Obrenović.; 10 June [O.S. 29 May] 1868: Knez Mihailo Obrenović is assassinated in the Košutnjak Forest.
Principality/Kingdom of Serbia: 1878–1914	1878: The Berlin Congress recognized the independence of Serbia in the Treaty of Berlin.; 1882: Belgrade is the capital of the Kingdom of Serbia.; 1883: The first telephone lines in Belgrade.; 1884: railway stations and a railway bridge over Sava is constructed.; 1892: The first modern water supply.; 13 June [O.S. 1 June] 1892: Famous inventor Nikola Tesla visits Belgrade.; 1893: Electrification of the city.; 1894: The first electric tramway.; 11 June [O.S. 29 May] 1903: In a coup d'état, King Aleksandar Obrenović is assassinated, and King Petar I Karađorđević ascends the throne of Serbia.; 6 October [O.S. 23 September] 1908: Huge protests against the Austria-Hungary annexation of Bosnia and Herzegovina.

=== Early 20th century ===
Historical period	Events
Austro-Hungarian invasion 1914	28 July [O.S. 15 July] 1914: Austria-Hungary declares war on Serbia, following the assassination of Archduke Franz Ferdinand of Austria. World War I begins with the bombing of Belgrade in the evening of the same day. Dušan Đonović falls as the first victim of the warfare.; 2 December 1914: Austrians bombard and occupy Belgrade.; 15 December 1914: The Serbs liberate Belgrade.
Austro-Hungarian occupation 1915–18	6–9 October 1915: German and Austrian troops led by August von Mackensen re-occupy Belgrade. Colonel Dragutin Gavrilović sacrifices the entire legion for the city.; 1 November 1918: The Serbs liberate Belgrade.
Kingdom of Serbia 1918	24 November 1918: The Assembly of Syrmia proclaims the secession of Syrmia from the State of Slovenes, Croats and Serbs and unification with the Kingdom of Serbia, thus unifying Belgrade with Zemun in the same state.; 25 November 1918: The Great people's assembly of Serbs, Bunjevci and other Slavs proclaims the unification of Banat, Bačka and Baranja with the Kingdom of Serbia, thus unifying Belgrade and the settlements on the Danube's left bank in the same state.
Kingdom of Yugoslavia 1918–1941	1 December 1918: Belgrade becomes the capital of the Kingdom of Serbs, Croats and Slovenes. The document was signed at Krsmanović's House at Terazije.; 28 January [O.S. 15 January] 1919: In order to coordinate the dating in different parts of the newly formed state, the territories of former Serbia and Montenegro adopt Gregorian calendar, which had already been in use in the other parts of the kingdom.; 1923: Paris–Budapest air line extended to Belgrade.; 25 March 1927: The first Belgrade airport (Dojno polje Airport) opened.; 6 January 1929: King Aleksandar Karađorđević dissolved the National Assembly and started his dictatorship. Belgrade becomes the capital of the Kingdom of Yugoslavia.; 24 March 1929: Radio Belgrade started broadcasting.; 1 April 1934: Zemun annexed to the City of Belgrade.; 27 October 1935: The first bridge over the Danube, the Pančevački most (Bridge of Pančevo) is built.; 11 September 1937: Belgrade Fair opened.; 20 May 1938: Drying out of the wetland on the Sava's left bank begins, making place for the future New Belgrade.; 14 December 1939: Leftist students' protests against the government, poverty and war. During the police breakdown of the demonstrations, five to ten protesters are killed (depending on the sources).; 27 March 1941: Huge protests against joining the Axis.; 6–8 April 1941: Nazi Germany bombs Belgrade (Operation Retribution). 2,271–4,000 casualties, depending on the sources. Many public and private buildings completely destroyed, including the building of the National Library of Serbia, along with an invaluable collection of books, manuscripts, charters, old maps, journals and many other documents. The Royal Yugoslav Army, while retreating, destroys all the bridges crossing Sava and Danube.
Nazi German occupation 1941–1944	12 April 1941: Belgrade is occupied by German forces.; April 1941 – October 1944: Belgrade is occupied and divided. Old part of the city becomes a part of Nazi Germany and the capital of the Territory of the Military Commander in Serbia, governed by puppet Government of National Salvation. The settlements on the Danube's left bank become a part of the Banat autonomous region, formally responsible to the puppet governments in Belgrade, but in practice governed by its Volksdeutsche (ethnic German) minority, while Zemun becomes a part of the Independent State of Croatia. Four concentration camps have operated on the territory of the occupied Belgrade: Sajmište, Banjica, Topovske Šupe, and Milišić's brickyard. Approximately 50,000 people have died in these camps, most of them in Sajmište concentration camp, on the territory controlled by the Independent State of Croatia.; 1942: The Germans, using forced labour, build Old Sava Bridge.; April–September 1944: The Allies have bombed Belgrade eleven times. 1,000 – 5,000 civilian casualties, depending on the sources.; 14 September 1944 – 24 November 1944: Belgrade Offensive by the units of the Soviet Red Army and the Yugoslav Partisans. The main battles in the Belgrade's urban area took place 28 September 1944 – 20 October 1944.; 20 October 1944: Liberation of Belgrade. Miladin Zarić, an ordinary citizen, saves Old Sava Bridge from demolition, by cutting the detonator wires, making it the only large bridge in Europe, beside Ludendorff Bridge, that the Germans didn't succeed in demolishing while retreating. This way, the Soviet troops manage to cross Sava river and to definitely expel the Germans from the city.; 22 October 1944: Liberation of Zemun.

=== Late 20th century ===
Historical period	Events
Communist Yugoslavia 1944–1991	29 November 1945: The Constitutional Assembly proclaimed the Federal People's Republic of Yugoslavia. Monarchy was abolished and Josip Broz Tito started to rule officially. Industries nationalised. Large number of regime opponents arrested and sentenced to hard labour.; 7 November 1946: The Pančevački most rebuilt and opened for railway transportation. The bridge was opened for road traffic on 29 November 1946.; 11 April 1948: The building of New Belgrade officially started.; 1950: Government introduced self-management of the industry by the employees.; 1958: TV Belgrade started broadcasting.; 1961: The first Conference of Non-Aligned Movement held in Belgrade.; 28 April 1962: Belgrade Nikola Tesla Airport officially opened in the Belgrade suburb of Surčin.; 1 September 1963: Red Star Stadium officially opened.; 1967: The first Belgrade International Theatre Festival (BITEF) held.; 1968: Students' protests in Belgrade.; 13 July 1968: The terrorist attack in the "20. oktobar" cinema, during the projection of Du rififi à Paname. One person dead, 89 injured. Croatian Miljenko Hrkać convicted of the attack and sentenced to death.; 1969: Beograđanka, one of the tallest buildings in the city built.; 1970: Gazela (Gaselle) bridge built.; 1971: E75 highway through Belgrade officially opened for traffic.; 1971: The first FEST (annual film festival) held.; February – May 1972: 1972 outbreak of smallpox in Yugoslavia.; 24 May 1973: Pionir Hall officially opened.; 30 May 1973: Belgrade hosts 1973 European Cup Final.; 1974: New Constitution of the Socialist Federal Republic of Yugoslavia adopted.; 7–15 June 1975: Belgrade hosts EuroBasket 1975 finals.; 17–20 June 1976: Belgrade hosts UEFA Euro 1976 finals.; 1977–1978: The Conference of Organization for Security and Co-operation in Europe held in Belgrade.; 1979: Annual meetings of the International Bank for Reconstruction and Development and the International Monetary Fund held in Belgrade.; 24 October-28 November 1980: 21st General Conference of UNESCO held in Belgrade.; 6–30 June 1983: Sixth session of the United Nations Conference on Trade and Development held in Belgrade.; 1988: First meeting of the ministers of foreign affairs of the Balkan States.; 19 November 1988: The Brotherhood and unity rally held at Ušće as an integral part of the "anti-bureaucratic revolution". Slobodan Milošević (at the time Chairman of the Serbian Communist League's Central Committee) addresses the crowd of approximately 1,000,000 people, according to the official estimates (several hundred thousand according to other sources).; 9 December 1990: The first multi-party elections held, after 45 years of the League of Communists of Yugoslavia rule.; 9 March 1991: Around 100,000 people demonstrate against the regime of Slobodan Milošević. One protester and one policeman are killed. Police and army tanks on the streets of Belgrade.
Federal Republic of Yugoslavia/Serbia and Montenegro 1992–2006	27 April 1992: Federal Republic of Yugoslavia proclaimed, following the separation of Slovenia, Croatia, Bosnia and Herzegovina and Macedonia from SFR Yugoslavia. The new country consists of Serbia and Montenegro.; 30 May 1992: The UN Security Council imposed economic embargo on FR Yugoslavia.; 31 May 1992: The first multi-party local elections for the representatives in the assemblies of the City and municipalities held.; 1993 – 24 January 1994: The highest hyperinflation in the history struck Belgrade, bringing many citizens to the limits of existence.; 7 July 1995: Underground railway station "Vukov spomenik" opened. Similar to the RER of Paris, this is to become the first station of Belgrade Metro.; 19 November 1996 – 22 March 1997: Mass protests in response to electoral fraud attempted by the regime of Slobodan Milošević after local elections.; 21 February 1997: The first non-communist city government since 1944, with Zoran Đinđić as the first non-communist Mayor of Belgrade.; 24 March – 10 June 1999: NATO bombing of Yugoslavia. The buildings of the Government of Serbia, Yugoslav Ministry of Defence building, Radio Television of Serbia, Hotel Jugoslavija, Avala Tower, Batajnica Air Base, Chinese embassy, University Hospital Center Dr Dragiša Mišović, and many other buildings and structures in Belgrade are partly or completely destroyed.; 5 October 2000: Slobodan Milošević removed from power after huge protests in Belgrade. The House of the National Assembly was set on fire.; 4 February 2003: Federal Republic of Yugoslavia changed into Serbia and Montenegro.; 12 March 2003: Serbian Prime Minister Zoran Đinđić is assassinated in front of the Government of Serbia building in Nemanjina Street.; 21 August 2003: The official opening of the first Belgrade Beer Fest.; 31 July 2004: Belgrade Arena, one of the largest multifunctional indoor arenas in Europe officially opened; 10 January 2005: The organization of the 2009 Summer Universiade is awarded to Belgrade.; 16–25 September 1975: Belgrade hosts EuroBasket 2005 finals.; February 2006: Belgrade proclaimed City of Future of South Europe by fDi magazine, a Financial Times publication.

=== Modern era ===
Historical period	Events
Republic of Serbia 2006–present	6 June 2006: Belgrade becomes the capital of independent Republic of Serbia, following 2006 Montenegro declaration of independence.; 17 February 2008: Mass protests follow the 2008 Kosovo declaration of independence.; 20–24 May 2008: Belgrade hosts Eurovision Song Contest 2008.; 1 July to 12 July 2009: Belgrade hosts 2009 Summer Universiade, the largest sporting event ever to be organized by the city.; 20 December 2009: Government in Belgrade decides to apply for EU membership.; 21 April 2010: Avala Tower opened after the reconstruction, following its complete demolition during the 1999 NATO bombing campaign.; 1 January 2012: Ada Bridge opened for traffic. The first new bridge built in Belgrade in 42 years.; May 2014: 2014 Southeast Europe floods make devastating damage. The Obrenovac suburb completely flooded.; 27 June 2014: City officials officially present Belgrade Waterfront (Beograd na vodi), the €3.1 billion worthy project of the renewal of the Sava banks and the old part of the city.; 18 December 2014: Pupin Bridge opened for traffic. The second Belgrade bridge over Danube and the first one connecting Zemun with the settlements on the Danube's left bank.; 27 September 2015: The Belgrade Waterfront construction works begin.; 30 November 2018: The beginning of mass protests against the president Aleksandar Vučić authoritarian government.; March 2020: The beginning of COVID-19 pandemic in Serbia. A curfew hour is designated by the authorities.; 3–4 May 2023: Two mass murders occur in Vladislav Ribnikar elementary school and in the Belgrade suburbs, leading to a wave of mass protests.; 28 June 2023: Belgrade bypass sectors A and B finished after more than 30 years of construction, thus enabling the demotion of the highway which passed through the city center to a regular urban thoroughfare.; November 2024 – present: University students led mass protests following the Novi Sad railway station canopy collapse.

== See also ==
- History of Belgrade
- Siege of Belgrade (disambiguation)
