= History of Belgrade =

Occurrences and people in Belgrade throughout history

The history of Belgrade dates back to at least 5700 BC. One of the largest prehistoric cultures of Europe, the Vinča culture, evolved from the Belgrade area in the 6th millennium BC. In antiquity, Thraco-Dacians inhabited the region, and after 279 BC Celts conquered the city, naming it Singidūn. It was conquered by the Romans during the reign of Augustus, and awarded city rights in the mid 2nd century. It was settled by the Slavs in the 520s, and changed hands several times before it became the capital of King Stefan Dragutin (1282–1316). In 1521 Belgrade was conquered by the Ottoman Empire and became the seat of a sanjak. It frequently passed from Ottoman to Habsburg rule, which saw the destruction of most of the city during the Austro-Ottoman wars. Belgrade was again named the capital of Serbia in 1841. The north of Belgrade remained an Habsburg outpost until 1918, when it was merged into the capital city. As a strategic location, the city was battled over in 115 wars and razed to the ground 44 times. Belgrade was the capital of Yugoslavia (in various forms of governments) from its creation in 1918, to its final dissolution in 2006.

== Etymology ==
A theory suggests that the ancient name Singidunum (Celtic: *Singidūn, Greek: Σιγγιδών) actually bears its modern meaning – "White Fort (town)".

The first mention of Belgrade, in its current form, is from a letter written on 16 April 878, by Pope John VIII to Boris I Mihail, when the city was held by the Bulgarian Kingdom.

The contemporary name of Belgrade derives from the Slavic words "bel" (i.e. "white") and "grad" (i.e. "town"-"city" or "castle"-"fort"). Historically, Slavs name a place of living "grad" or "gorod" only if it has some protective walls – "ograda" in Slavic. And Slavs don't divide between "town" and "city". So the meaning of Belgrade is White City or White Castle.

Serbs write the word Beograd without "l" exactly like they pronounce it.

White City is not so uncommon as a name between Slavic people, for example: Belgorod in Russia, Bilhorod on Dniester in Ukraine, or Biograd na Moru in Croatia.

== Prehistory ==
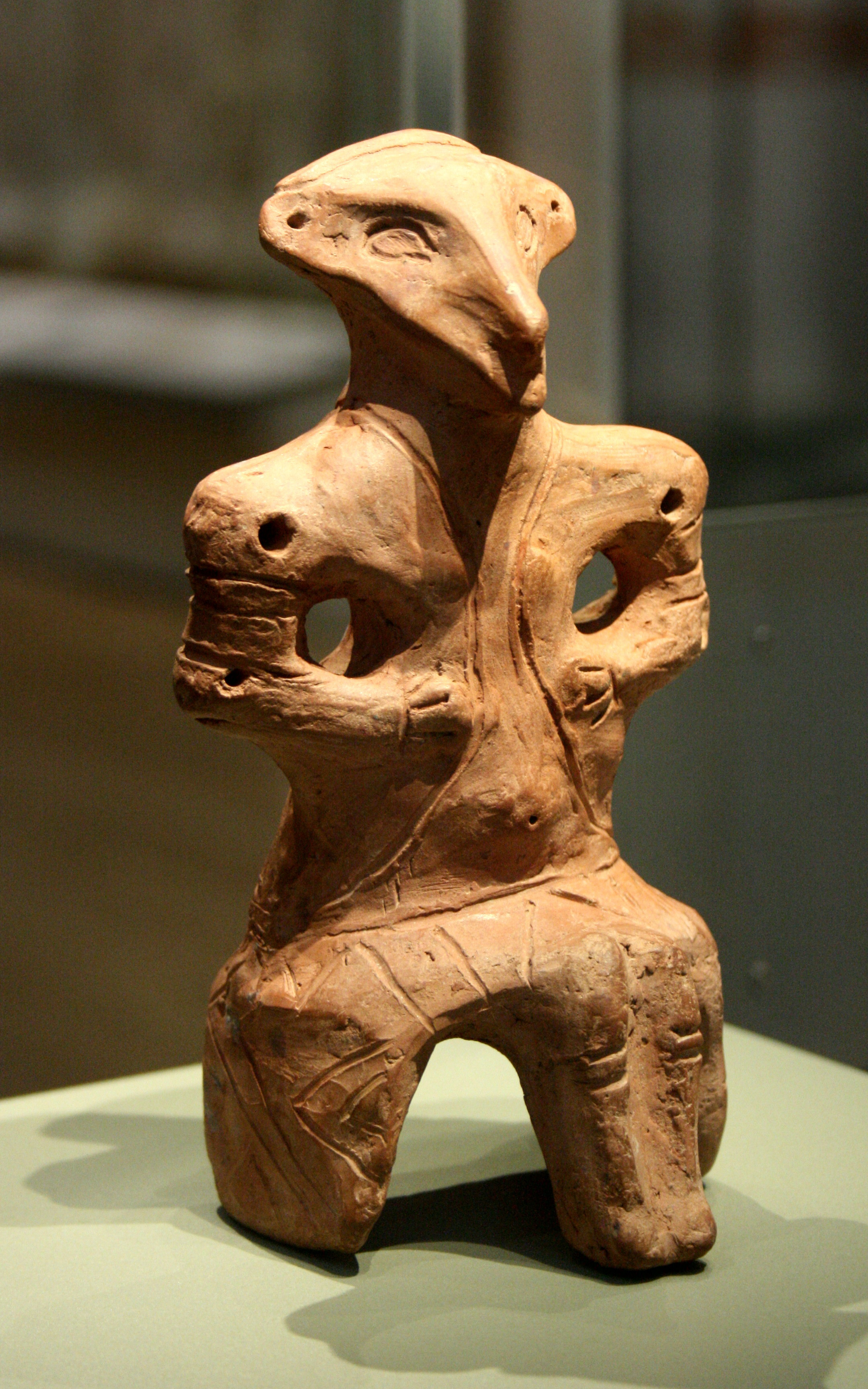
Lady of Vinča (5500 BC)

Chipped stone tools found at Zemun show that the area around Belgrade was inhabited by nomadic foragers in the Palaeolithic and Mesolithic eras. Some of these tools belong to the Mousterian industry, which are associated with Neanderthals rather than modern humans. Aurignacian and Gravettian tools have also been discovered there, indicating occupation between 50,000 and 20,000 years ago.

The first farming people to settle in the region are associated with the Neolithic Starčevo culture, which flourished between 6200 and 5200 BC. There are several Starčevo sites in and around Belgrade, including the eponymous site of Starčevo. The Starčevo culture was succeeded by the Vinča culture (5500–4500 BC), a more sophisticated farming culture that grew out of the earlier Starčevo settlements which is also named for a site in the Belgrade region (Vinča-Belo Brdo). The Vinča culture is known for its very large settlements, one of the earliest settlements by continuous habitation and some of the largest in prehistoric Europe; anthropomorphic figurines such as the Lady of Vinča; the earliest known copper metallurgy in Europe; a proto-writing form developed prior to the Sumerians and Minoans, known as the Old European script, dating back to around 5300 BC.

== Antiquity ==
=== Pre-Roman (800 BC–75 BC) ===
The Paleo-Balkan tribes of Thracians and Dacians were the masters of this area prior to the Roman conquest. Belgrade was inhabited by a Thraco-Dacian tribe Singi, while after the Celtic invasion in 279 BC, the Scordisci took the city, naming it "Singidūn" (dun, fortress).

=== Roman era (35 BC–395 AD) ===
The Romans reached the area of Belgrade during Octavian's Dalmatian War in 35–34 BC. It became the Romanised Singidunum in the 1st century AD, and by the mid-2nd century, the city was proclaimed a municipium by the Roman authorities, evolving into a full-fledged colonia by the end of the century.

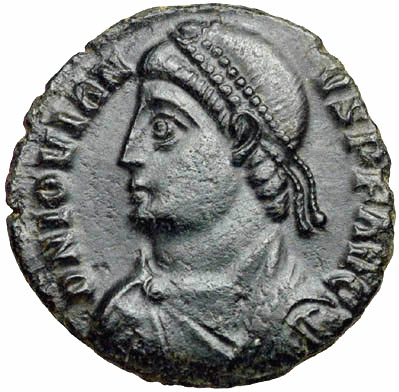
Emperor Jovian, born in Singidunum

The Romans first began to establish firm control over the lands surrounding Singidun during the late 1st century BC. Moesia was organised as a Roman province in 29 BC, and Singidun was Romanised as Singidunum. It became an important settlement of Moesia, situated between Sirmium (modern Sremska Mitrovica) and Viminacium (modern Kostolac), and just across the Sava River from Taurunum (modern Zemun) in Pannonia. Singidunum occupied a strategic position on the Danubian limes, the frontier system of roads, forts, and settlements along the river.

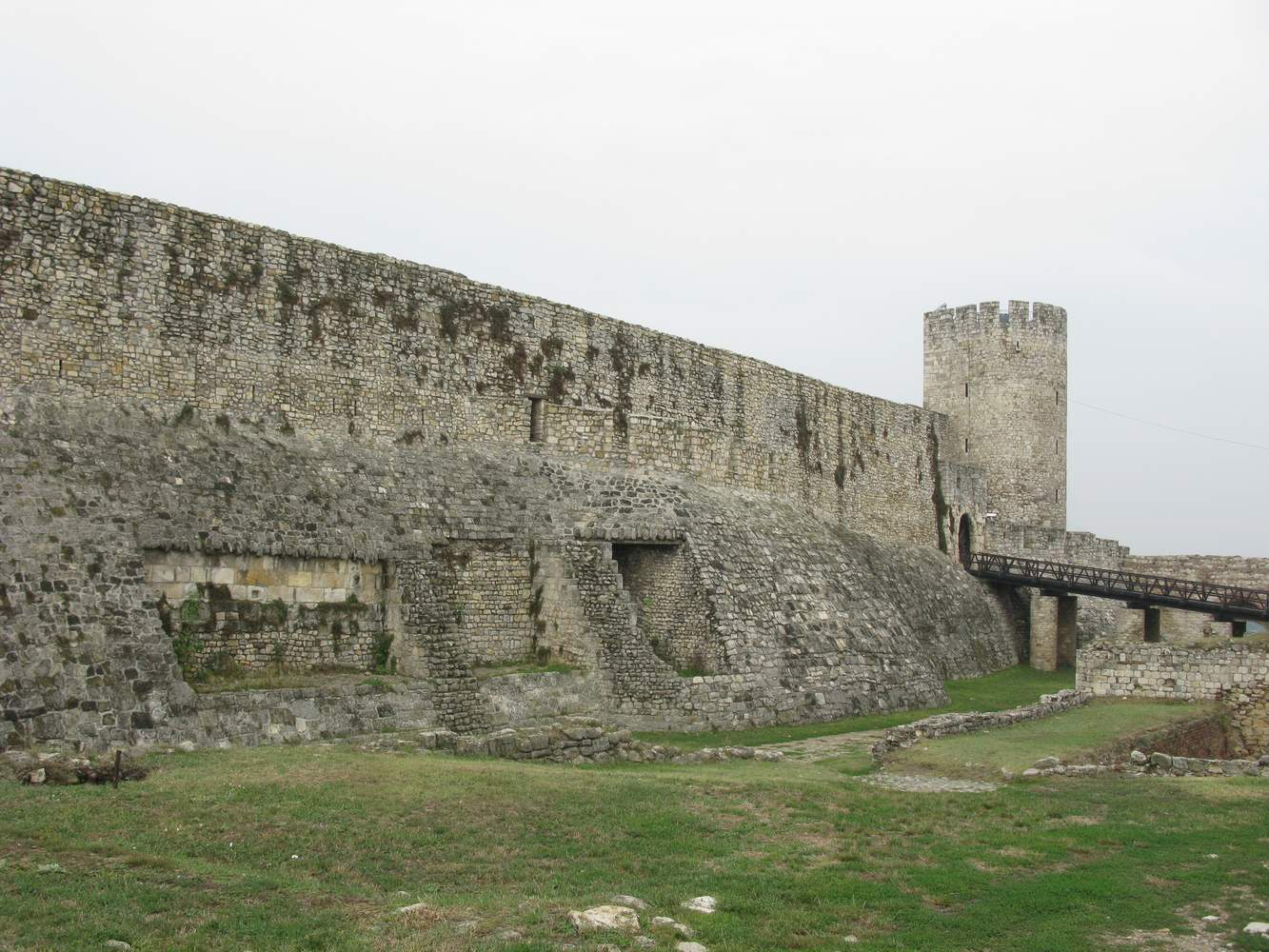
Remains of the Roman castrum

Singidunum reached its height after the arrival of Legio IV Flavia Felix, which was stationed there from the end of the 1st century AD. The legion built a castrum (fort) on the site of the Upper Town of today's Kalemegdan, where remains of the Roman military camp have survived. The fortress was first built with earth and timber defences and was later rebuilt in stone. The legion made Singidunum a major military centre on the frontier, while a civilian settlement developed around the camp. In time, the town took on a rectilinear construction, with its streets meeting at right angles. Traces of the Roman street plan are preserved in the orientation of parts of central Belgrade, including the area of Knez Mihailova Street, Studentski Trg, Uzun Mirkova, Dušanova, and Kralja Petra I. Studentski Trg (Students' Square) was in the area of the Roman civil settlement, where remains including thermae have been found. Other remnants of Roman material culture, such as tombs, monuments, sculptures, ceramics, and coins, have been found in Belgrade and its surroundings. Roman remains are also preserved beneath the Belgrade City Library, in the space known as the Roman Hall. Hadrian granted Singidunum the rights of municipium during the mid-2nd century, and the city later became a colonia. The Roman Emperor Jovian was born in Singidunum in 330 or 332. Singidunum and Moesia experienced a period of stability under Roman rule, but this was affected by growing turmoil both outside the Empire and within it. The Roman Empire began to decline at the end of the 3rd century. The province of Dacia, established by several successful and lengthy campaigns by Trajan, came under pressure from invading peoples during the 3rd century. By 270, Aurelian abandoned Dacia north of the Danube and reorganised the frontier south of the river. Singidunum again became a frontier stronghold on the limes, one of the major fortified settlements facing danger from groups beyond the Danube.

== Middle Ages ==
=== Byzantine (395–626) ===
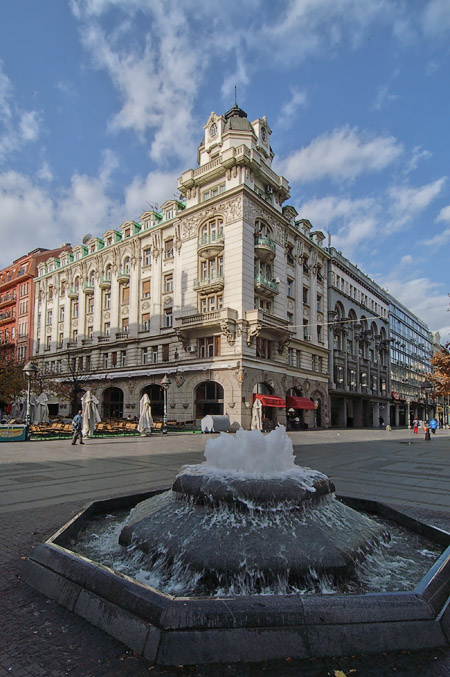
Prince Michael Street in Belgrade follows the original grid layout of Singidunum.

In 395, upon the death of Theodosius I, the Roman Empire was split into two, with Singidunum lying on the northwestern border of the Eastern Roman Empire (later to become the Byzantine Empire). Moesia and Illyricum suffered devastating raids by the successive invasions of the Huns, Ostrogoths, Gepids, Sarmatians, Avars, and Slavs. Singidunum fell to the Huns in 441, who razed the city and fortress, selling its Roman inhabitants into indentured servitude. Over the next two hundred years, the city passed hands several times: the Romans reclaimed the city after the fall of the Hun confederation in 454, but the Sarmatians conquered the city shortly thereafter. In 470 the Ostrogoths seized the city around, expelling the Sarmatians. The city was later invaded by Gepids (488), but the Ostrogoths recaptured it in 504. Six years later the Eastern Roman Empire reclaimed the city according to a peace treaty.

Byzantine emperor Justinian I rebuilt Singidunum in 535, restoring the fortress and city to its former military importance. The city saw a brief peaceful period of about fifty years, but was then sacked with the arrival of the Avars in 584. During Maurice's Balkan campaigns, Singidunum served as a base of operations, but it was lost again in the early half of the 7th century when the Avars sacked and burned Singidunum to the ground. Around 630, the Slavs settled in the area and in Singidunum, coordinated by a Roman fortress commander. By this time, however, the city had lost its importance as a border fortification and was largely ignored by the Slavs, who dominated the area.

=== Early Middle Ages ===
In 442, the area was ravaged by Attila the Hun. In 471, it was taken by Theodoric the Great, who continued into Greece. As the Ostrogoths left for Italy, the Gepids took over the city. In 539 it was retaken by the Byzantines. In 577, some 100,000 Slavs poured into Thrace and Illyricum, pillaging cities and settling down. The Avars under Bayan I conquered the whole region by 582. According to Byzantine chronicle De Administrando Imperio, the White Serbs had stopped in Belgrade on their way back home, asking the strategos for lands; they received provinces in the west, towards the Adriatic, which they would rule as subjects to Heraclius (610–641). The first record of the name Belograd appeared on 16 April 878 in a letter from Pope John VIII to the ruler of the Bulgarian Empire Boris I, part of which was the city. For about four centuries, the city remained a battleground between the Byzantine Empire, the Kingdom of Hungary and the Bulgarian Empire.

=== High Middle Ages ===
Basil II (976–1025) installed a garrison in Belgrade. The city hosted the armies of the First and the Second Crusade; while passing through during the Third Crusade, Frederick Barbarossa and his 190,000 crusaders saw Belgrade in ruins.

Stephen Dragutin (r. 1276–1282), received Belgrade from his father-in-law, Stephen V of Hungary in 1284; it served as the capital of the Kingdom of Syrmia, and Dragutin is regarded as the first Serbian king to rule over Belgrade.

=== Late Middle Ages ===
Following the Battle of Maritsa in 1371 and the Battle of Kosovo in 1389, the Serbian Empire began to crumble as the Ottoman Empire conquered its southern territory. The north resisted through the Serbian Despotate, which had Belgrade as its capital. The city flourished under Stefan Lazarević, son of Serbian prince Lazar Hrebeljanović. Lazarević built a castle with a citadel and towers, of which only the Despot's tower and west wall remain. He also refortified the city's ancient walls, allowing the Despotate to resist the Ottomans for almost 70 years. During this time, Belgrade was a haven for many Balkan peoples fleeing Ottoman rule, and is thought to have had a population of 40,000 to 50,000 people.

In 1427, Stefan's successor Đurađ Branković had to return Belgrade to the Hungarian king, and Smederevo became the new capital. Although the Ottomans captured most of the Serbian Despotate, Nándorfehérvár – as it was known in the Kingdom of Hungary – was unsuccessfully besieged in 1440 and again in 1456. As it presented an obstacle to their advance into Hungary and further Europe, over 100,000 Ottoman soldiers launched the 1456 Siege of Nándorfehérvár, in which the Christian army under commander John Hunyadi successfully defended the city from the Ottomans, wounding Sultan Mehmed II. The noon bell ordered by Pope Callixtus III commemorates the victory throughout the Christian world to this day.

== Early modern period ==
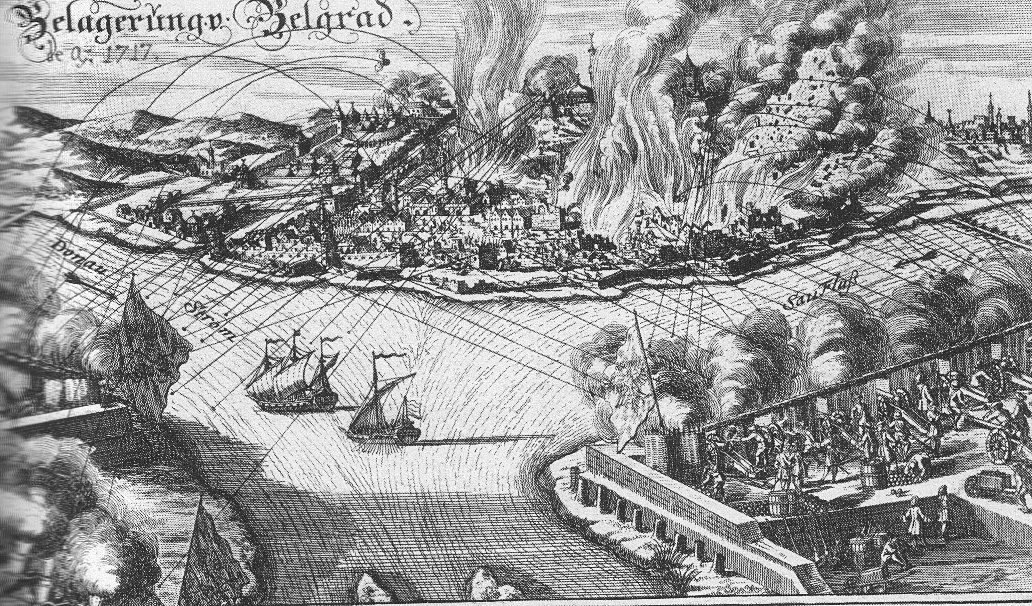
Austrian conquest of Belgrade: 1717 by Eugene of Savoy, during the Austro-Turkish War of 1716–18

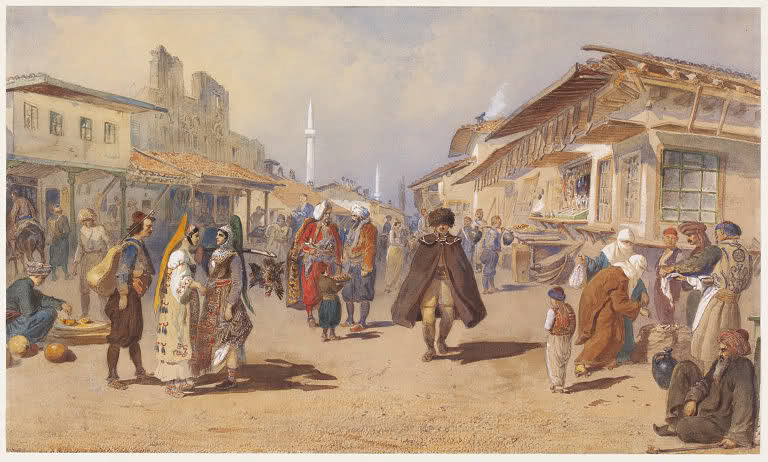
Ottoman Belgrade in a 1865 painting by Carl Goebel

=== Ottoman conquest and Austrian invasions ===
Seven decades after the initial siege, on 28 August 1521, the fort was finally captured by Ottoman Sultan Suleyman the Magnificent and his 250,000 soldiers; subsequently, most of the city was razed to the ground and its entire Orthodox Christian population was deported to Istanbul, to an area that has since become known as the Belgrade forest. Belgrade was made the seat of the district (Sanjak), becoming the second largest Ottoman town in Europe at over 100,000 people, surpassed only by Constantinople. Ottoman rule also introduced Ottoman architecture, including numerous mosques, increasing the city's Oriental influences. In 1594, a major Serb rebellion was crushed by the Ottomans. Later, Grand vizier Sinan Pasha ordered the relics of Saint Sava to be publicly torched on the Vračar plateau; in the 20th century, the Temple of Saint Sava was built to commemorate this event. Occupied by the Habsburgs three times (1688–1690, 1717–1739, 1789–1791), headed by the Holy Roman Princes Maximilian of Bavaria and Eugene of Savoy, and field marshal Baron Ernst Gideon von Laudon respectively, Belgrade was quickly recaptured by the Ottomans and substantially razed each time. During this period, the city was affected by the two Great Serbian Migrations, in which hundreds of thousands of Serbs, led by two Serbian Patriarchs, retreated together with the Austrians into the Habsburg Empire, settling in today's Vojvodina and Slavonia.

== Modern period ==
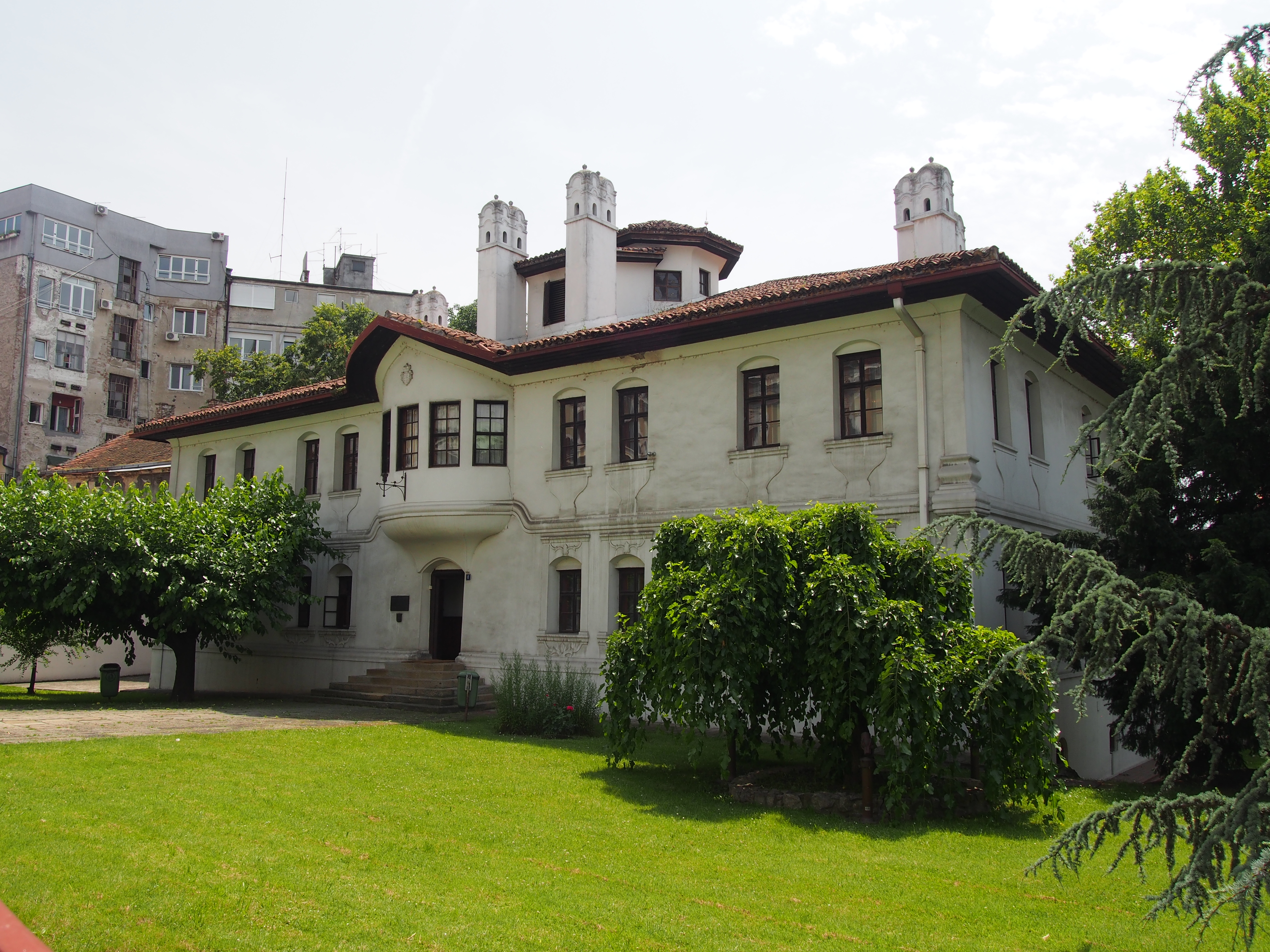
The Residence of Princess Ljubica by Hadži-Neimar, 1830

=== Capital of independent Serbia ===
During the First Serbian Uprising, the Serbian revolutionaries held the city from 8 January 1807 until 1813, when it was retaken by the Ottomans. After the Second Serbian Uprising in 1815, Serbia reached semi-independence, which was formally recognized by the Porte in 1830. In 1841, Prince Mihailo Obrenović moved the capital from Kragujevac to Belgrade. In May 1868, Prince Mihailo was assassinated with his cousin Anka Konstantinović while riding in a carriage through the park of his country residence.

With the Principality's full independence in 1878, and its transformation into the Kingdom of Serbia in 1882, Belgrade once again became a key city in the Balkans, and developed rapidly. Nevertheless, conditions in Serbia as a whole remained those of an overwhelmingly agrarian country, even with the opening of a railway to Niš, Serbia's second city, and in 1900 the capital had only 70,000 inhabitants (at the time Serbia numbered 1.5 million). Yet by 1905 the population had grown to more than 80,000, and by the outbreak of World War I in 1914, it had surpassed 100,000 citizens, not counting Zemun which then belonged to Austria-Hungary. At the time of independence, Belgrade looked like an Ottoman city, and the city planner Emilijan Josimović stated he wanted to rebuild Belgrade so that "the capital does not retain the form that barbarism gave it". Josimović's inspiration for rebuilding Belgrade was Vienna, right down to building grand boulevards inspired by the Ringstrasse. Josimović's design replaced the narrow, winding streets with a grid pattern full of wide streets intersected with parks. All that is left of Ottoman Belgrade today are one mosque, the citadel, and a fountain with Arabic inscriptions.

The first-ever projection of motion pictures in the Balkans and Central Europe was held in Belgrade, in June 1896 by Andre Carr, a representative of the Lumière brothers. He shot the first motion pictures of Belgrade in the next year; however, they have not been preserved.

=== World War I and the Interbellum ===
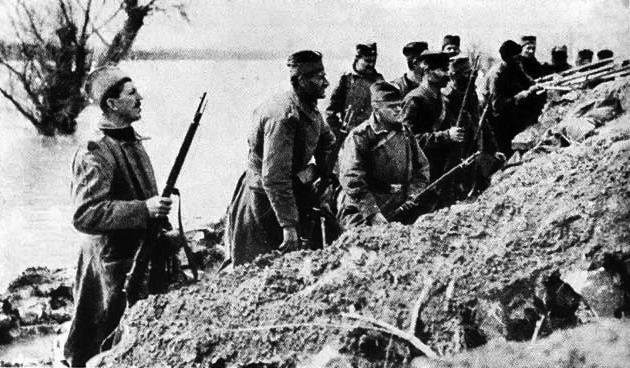
Serbian infantry positioned at Ada Ciganlija

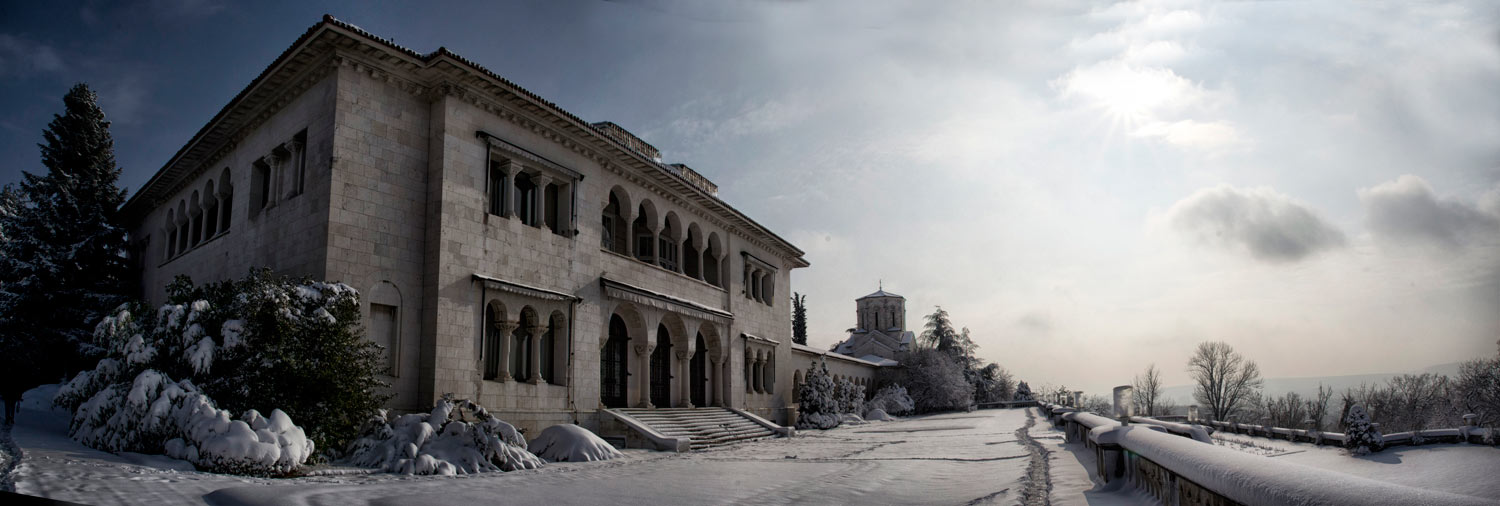
Royal Palace at Dedinje, 1929

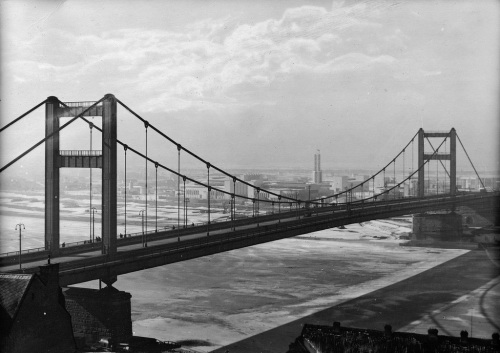
King Alexander Bridge, open 1934–41

The First World War began on 28 July 1914 when Austria-Hungary declared war on Serbia. Most of the subsequent Balkan offensives occurred near Belgrade. Austro-Hungarian monitors shelled Belgrade on 29 July 1914, and it was taken by the Austro-Hungarian Army under General Oskar Potiorek on 1 December. On 16 December, it was re-taken by Serbian troops under Marshal Radomir Putnik. After a prolonged battle which destroyed much of the city, between 6 and 9 October 1915, Belgrade fell to German and Austro-Hungarian troops commanded by Field Marshal August von Mackensen on 9 October 1915. The city was liberated by Serbian and French troops on 1 November 1918, under the command of Marshal Louis Franchet d'Espérey of France and Crown Prince Alexander of Serbia. Since Belgrade was decimated as the front-line city, Subotica overtook the title of the largest city in the Kingdom for a short while.

After the war, Belgrade became the capital of the new Kingdom of Serbs, Croats and Slovenes, renamed the Kingdom of Yugoslavia in 1929. The Kingdom was split into banovinas, and Belgrade, together with Zemun and Pančevo, formed a separate administrative unit.

During this period, the city experienced fast growth and significant modernisation. Belgrade's population grew to 239,000 by 1931 (incorporating the town of Zemun, formerly in Austria-Hungary), and 320,000 by 1940. In 1918, Belgrade had about 110,000 people and had about 350,000 people by 1941. The population growth rate between 1921 and 1948 averaged 4.08% a year. In 1927, Belgrade's first airport opened, and in 1929, its first radio station began broadcasting. The Pančevo Bridge, which crosses the Danube, was opened in 1935, while King Alexander Bridge over the Sava was opened in 1934. On 3 September 1939 the first Belgrade Grand Prix, the last Grand Prix motor racing race before the outbreak of World War II, was held around the Belgrade Fortress and was followed by 80,000 spectators. The winner was Tazio Nuvolari.

The majority of the new homes built in interwar Belgrade were made of wood together with scrap materials. One contemporary was not impressed with the new homes being built in Belgrade, writing: "Overnight they hauled timber beams, pounded them into the ground, built a roof with cheap scrap wood, and covered it with hole-punched till pitchers, porcelain pots, billboards, ... instead of walls, they wrapped the dwelling temporarily with tent canvases and carried in some battered oven". In 1930, a study revealed that 48% of working class houses in Belgrade were damp; 69% had no toilets and running water and 87% were structurally unsafe. One journalist wrote about the people living in these slums: "Hundreds of newspaper sellers, hawkers, washerwomen leave their filthy and gloomy dwellings while it is still dark. Handymen, workers of all trades, day laborers and the unskilled, the numerous doormen at law offices ... this entire army of workers move daily in an early morning wave into the city". Most homes and businesses in Belgrade did not have electricity. In 1934, the average electricity consumption in Belgrade was 90 kilowatts per hour compared to 253 kilowatts per hour in Budapest and 367 kilowatts per hour in Paris.

=== World War II ===
On 25 March 1941, the government of regent Crown Prince Paul signed the Tripartite Pact, joining the Axis powers in an effort to stay out of the Second World War and keep Yugoslavia neutral during the conflict. This was immediately followed by mass protests in Belgrade and a military coup d'état led by Air Force commander General Dušan Simović, who proclaimed King Peter II to be of age to rule the realm. Consequently, the city was heavily bombed by the Luftwaffe on 6 April 1941, which was Easter Sunday for the Eastern Orthodox. Knowing that most of the buildings in Belgrade were wooden, the Luftwaffe used incendiary bombs that started raging fires that devoured the makeshift, wooden homes of Belgrade and often the people living inside. Civilian casualties were significant, but sources vary widely from 1,500 to 17,000 killed. Yugoslavia was then invaded by German, Italian, Hungarian, and Bulgarian forces, Belgrade was occupied by the German Army on 13 April 1941 and suburbs as far east as Zemun, in the Belgrade metropolitan area, were incorporated into a Nazi state, the Independent State of Croatia. Belgrade became the seat of the Nedić regime, headed by General Milan Nedić.

During the summer and fall of 1941, in reprisal for guerrilla attacks, the Germans carried out several massacres of Belgrade citizens; in particular, members of the Jewish community were subject to mass shootings at the order of General Franz Böhme, the German Military Governor of Serbia. Böhme rigorously enforced the rule that for every German killed, 100 Serbs or Jews would be shot. The resistance movement in Belgrade was led by Major Žarko Todorović from 1941 until his arrest in 1943.

Belgrade was bombed by the Allies on 16 April 1944, killing about 1,100 people. This bombing fell on the Orthodox Christian Easter. Most of the city remained under German occupation until 20 October 1944, when it was liberated by the Red Army and the Communist Yugoslav Partisans. On 29 November 1945, Marshal Josip Broz Tito proclaimed the Federal People's Republic of Yugoslavia in Belgrade (later to be renamed to Socialist Federal Republic of Yugoslavia on 7 April 1963). Higher estimates from the former secret police place the victim count of political persecutions in Belgrade at 10,000.

=== After World War II ===
During the post-war period, Belgrade grew rapidly as the capital of the renewed Yugoslavia, developing as a major industrial center. In 1948, construction of New Belgrade started. In the late 1940s and 1950s, the Communist regime went out of its way to rebuild Belgrade in a futuristic style inspired by Le Corbusier to show that Yugoslavia was in the forefront of modernity and progress. In 1958, Belgrade's first television station began broadcasting. In 1961, the conference of Non-Aligned Countries was held in Belgrade under Tito's chairmanship. In 1962, Belgrade Nikola Tesla Airport was built.

In the 1960s, a number of prestige buildings were built, namely the new parliament building, the Ušće Towers which served as the headquarters for the Central Committee of the League of Communists, and the Hotel Jugoslavija. In 1964, Tito embarked upon the policy of "market socialism" that turned Yugoslavia into a mixed economy where communism co-existed with capitalism. Under "market socialism", small businesses were allowed and most of the price subsidies and controls were ended. A journalist from the Washington Post newspaper wrote in 1967: "Belgrade is a lively, frivolous, noisy, jam-packed city compared with the one I remember from twenty years ago". Western visitors to Belgrade in the late 1960s were astonished to see that the main streets were dominated by huge garish electric billboards promoting Western brands such as Coca-Cola, Volkswagen, Siemens and Pan Am, giving Belgrade the feel of a Western city. The huge posters of Karl Marx, Fredrich Engels and Tito that had dominated Belgrade before were overshadowed by the billboards promoting Western brands. The Belgradians in the 1960s were described by visitors as very fond of wearing fashionable Western clothing styles, with many noting that many women of Belgrade had an obsession with having their hair bleached blonde. The German historian Marie-Jannine Calic wrote that in the Belgrade of the 1960s "a vibrant hustle and bustle prevailed in the streets, squares, and numerous cafes." She also noted that the core of Belgrade had a very modern, futuristic look, but that "along the mighty boulevards huddled pathetic little stores selling cloth, metal goods and dishware next to the dingy workshops of shoemakers, silversmiths and candle makers". On the outer limits of Belgrade, there was a semi-rural feel as chickens and cows wandered about the streets while the people who lived there existed in dire poverty, making their living as peddlers, wandering musicians, rag pickers, panhandlers, shoe shiners, scissor grinders, casual laborers and other marginal occupations.

By 1969, the population of Belgrade passed the one million mark for the first time. The population increase was because of people moving from countryside to Belgrade as it was estimated in 1969 that every two of three Belgradians had been born in the rural areas. The population boom in the 1960s imposed serious social strains as the population was increasing faster than the pace of housing construction, which caused a housing crisis. The 1961 Yugoslav census showed that an average of 2.5 people lived per one room in Belgrade as against the average of 1.6 people per room in the rest of Yugoslavia. In 1965, it was estimated that there was a shortage of 50,000 housing units in Belgrade, which forced many people to make illegal makeshift homes in shops, basements, laundry rooms and even elevator shafts, while on the periphery of Belgrade people built wooden huts and cottages. The mayor of Belgrade, Branko Pešić, told a journalist in 1965: "In the last seven or eight years, 20,000 to 30,000 people have come to Belgrade each year. That equals an entire small town ... And all of these people find shelter somewhere, hole up someplace. Some get an apartment, but that is the smallest percentage of them. A great number are forced ... to house in basement, in unhygienic apartments and barracks. And whoever has not yet seen this should definitely see what this looks like ... Something like this doesn't even exist in Africa". Pešić during his time as mayor made a point of increasing the construction of apartments as fast as possible to solve the housing crisis. Quality was sacrificed for quantity, but the increased number of new apartments did much to solve the housing crisis.

In 1968, major student protests led to several street clashes between students and the police.

=== Breakup of Yugoslavia ===
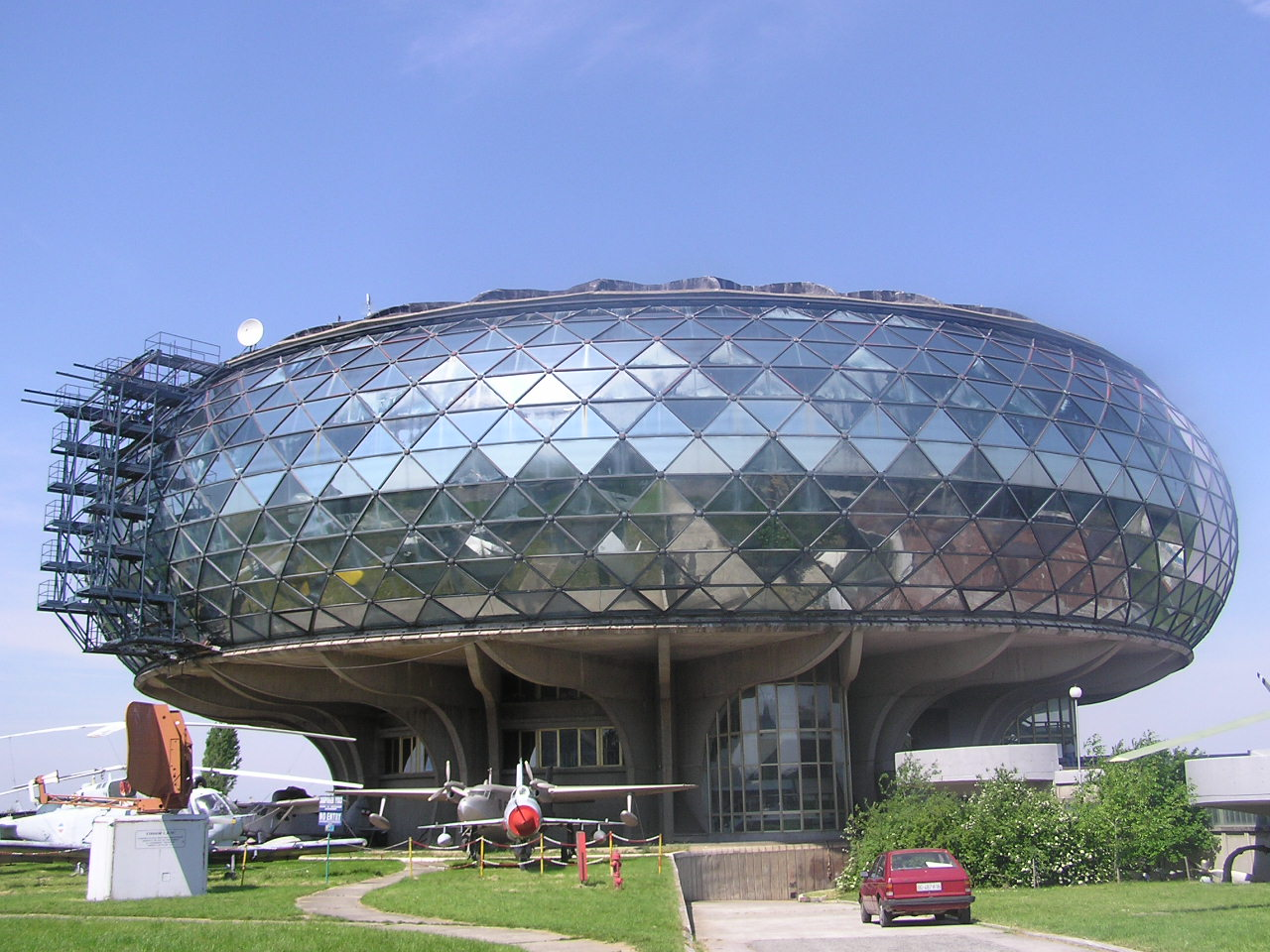
Museum of Aviation (Belgrade), by Ivan Štraus 1989

On 9 March 1991, massive demonstrations led by Vuk Drašković were held in the city against Slobodan Milošević. According to various media outlets, there were between 100,000 and 150,000 people on the streets. Two people were killed, 203 injured and 108 arrested during the protests, and later that day tanks were deployed onto the streets to restore order. Further protests were held in Belgrade from November 1996 to February 1997 against the same government after alleged electoral fraud at local elections. These protests brought Zoran Đinđić to power, the first mayor of Belgrade since World War II who did not belong to the League of Communists of Yugoslavia or its later offshoot, the Socialist Party of Serbia.

The Museum of Yugoslavia, the symbol of Yugo-nostalgia and a very popular tourist spot in Belgrade, was founded in 1996 as a replacement for two previous institutions: the “Josip Broz Tito” Memorial Center and the Museum of the Revolution of Yugoslav Peoples.

In 1999, during the Kosovo War, NATO bombings caused substantial damage to the city. Among the sites bombed were the buildings of several ministries, the RTS building, which killed 16 technicians, several hospitals, the Hotel Jugoslavija, the Central Committee building, the Avala Tower, and the Chinese embassy. Several of these buildings have been left in their bombed states to serve as a memorial for the bombings. According to the Humanitarian Law Center, 27 civilians and 16 soldiers were killed in Belgrade by NATO bombings.

Avala Tower, a very symbolic telecommunication and observation tower in Belgrade, was one of the 10 tallest towers in the world at the time it was completed in 1964. It was destroyed during the NATO bombing of Serbia, on the night of 29 April 1999. Building of the new Avala Tower, a replica of the old, started in 2007 and was completed in 2009. Including the antenna mast, it is 204,68 meters high (two meters higher than the original one). The new tower was opened for public on 21 April 2010. It is the tallest tower in the entire Balkan region.

After the 2000 presidential elections, Belgrade was the site of major public protests, with over half a million people on the streets. These demonstrations resulted in the ousting of president Milošević.

=== Contemporary period ===
On 1 January 2012, the new Ada Bridge over the Sava River in Belgrade was opened. The new bridge, funded by the European Bank for Reconstruction and Development (EBRD), considerably improved inner city transport.

In 2015, an agreement was reached with Eagle Hills (a UAE company) on the Belgrade Waterfront deal, for the construction of a new part of the city on currently undeveloped wasteland by the riverside. This project, officially started in 2015 and is one of the largest urban development projects in Europe, will cost at least 3.5 billion euros. According to Srdjan Garcevic, "Vaguely contemporary but somehow cheap-looking, it is planted illegally in the middle of the city on unstable soil – serving the interests of the anonymous lucky few."

In the summer of 2018 the main Belgrade train station closed its doors after 134 years in service as the new modern station opened a few miles away.

In June 2023, Serbia opened for traffic a new 9.74-km section of the Belgrade bypass, meaning reduction of truck traffic in the city centre. The construction was mainly carried out by China's Power Construction Corporation (PowerChina). Serbia financed 15% of the project, with the remaining 85% coming in the form of a loan from China’s Exim Bank.

Construction of a new suburban rail line, which will link Belgrade Airport both to the city and the EXPO 2027 site, is scheduled to begin in mid-2024.

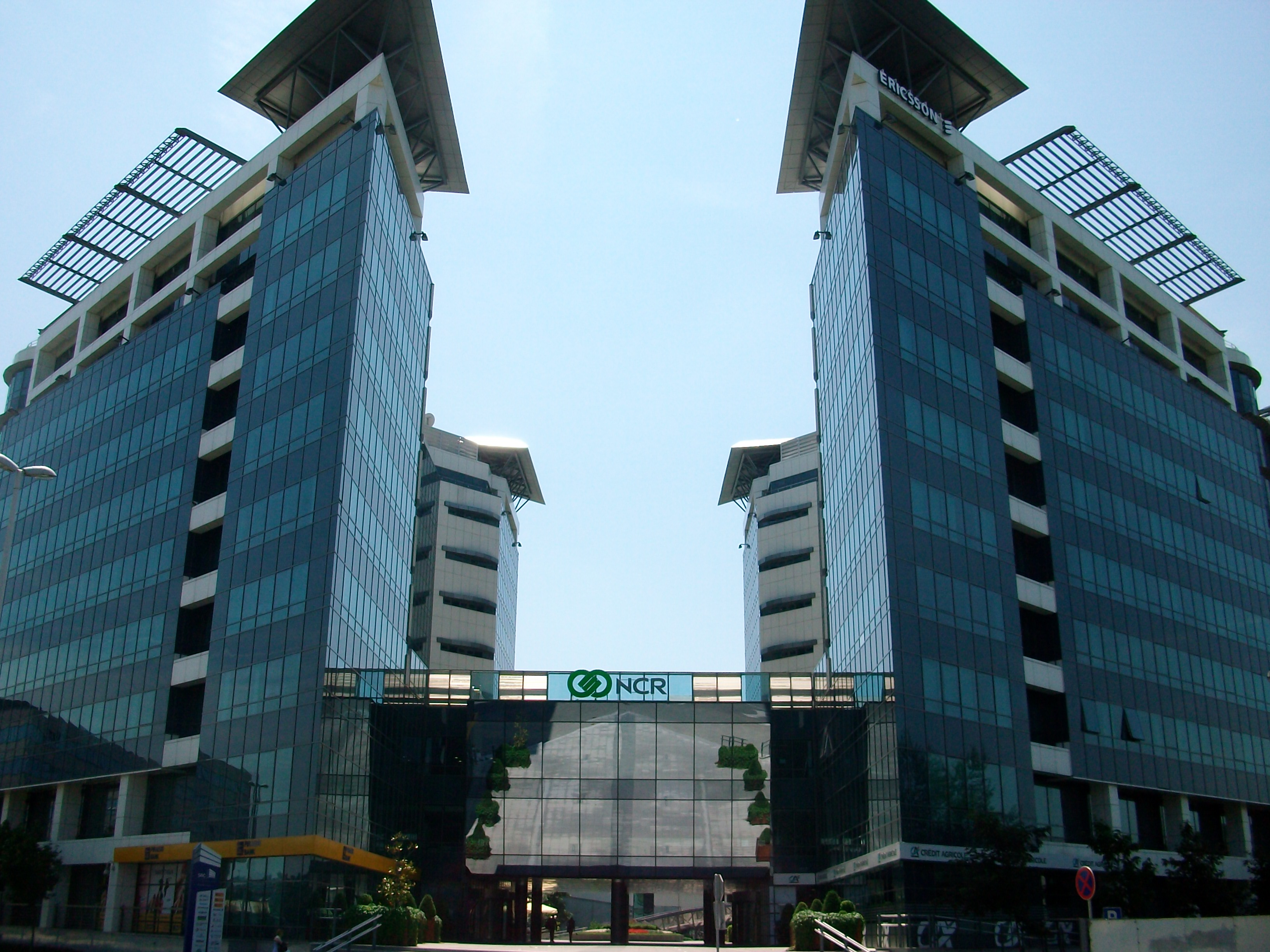
Sava City (Savograd), by Mario Jobst and Miodrag Trpković (2004–2010)

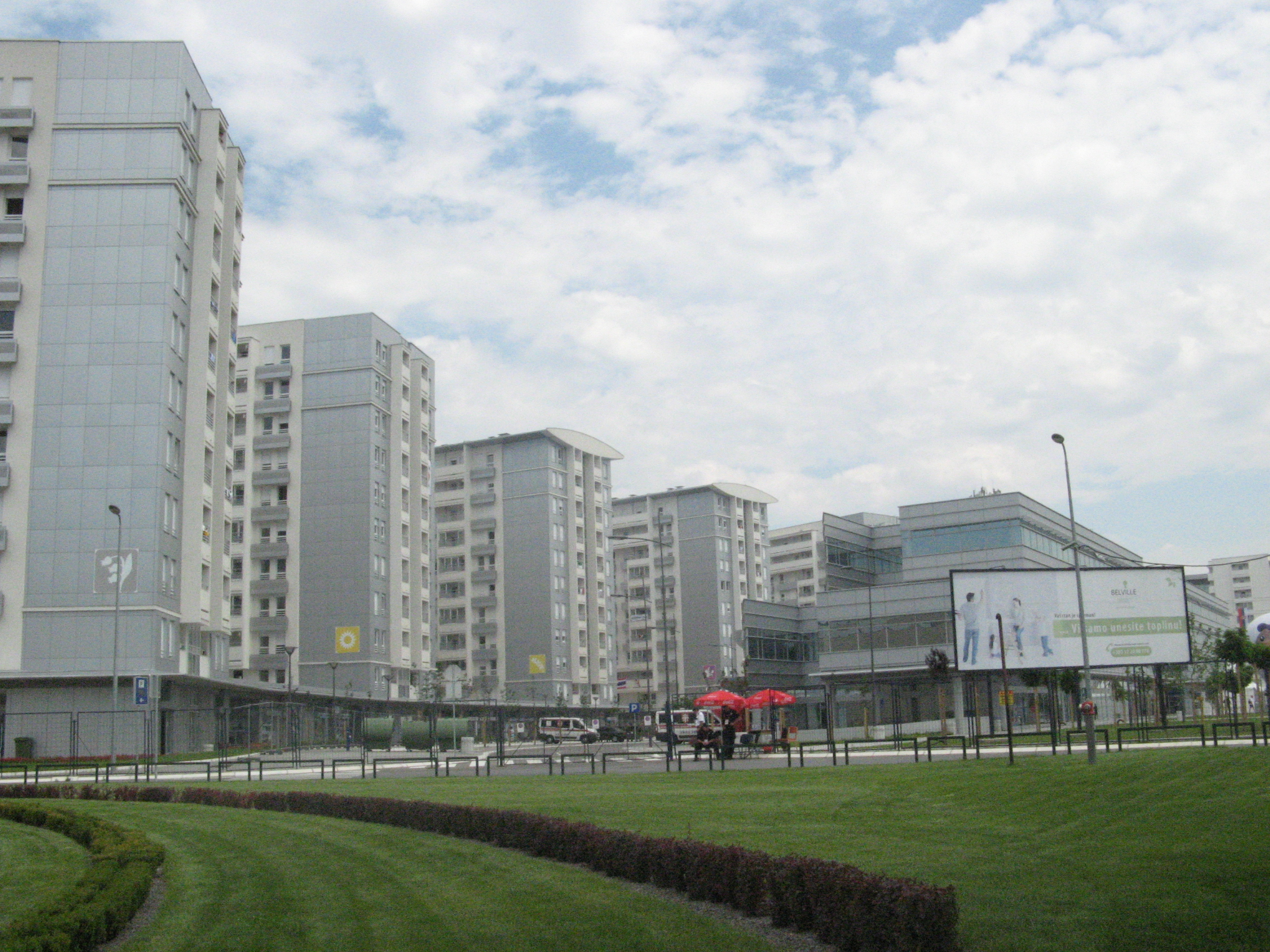
Belville, Belgrade (Block 67)

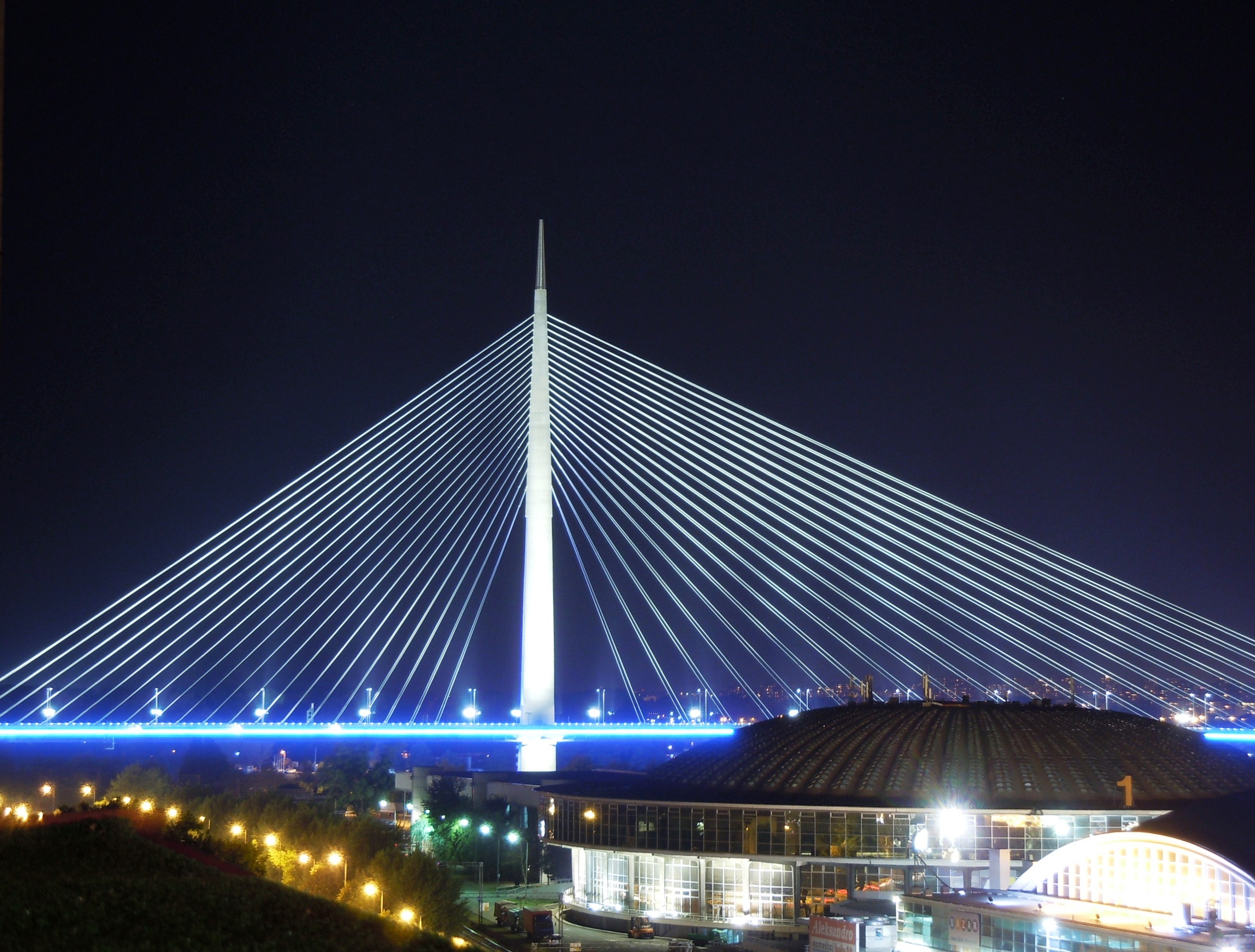
Ada Bridge (2008–2011)

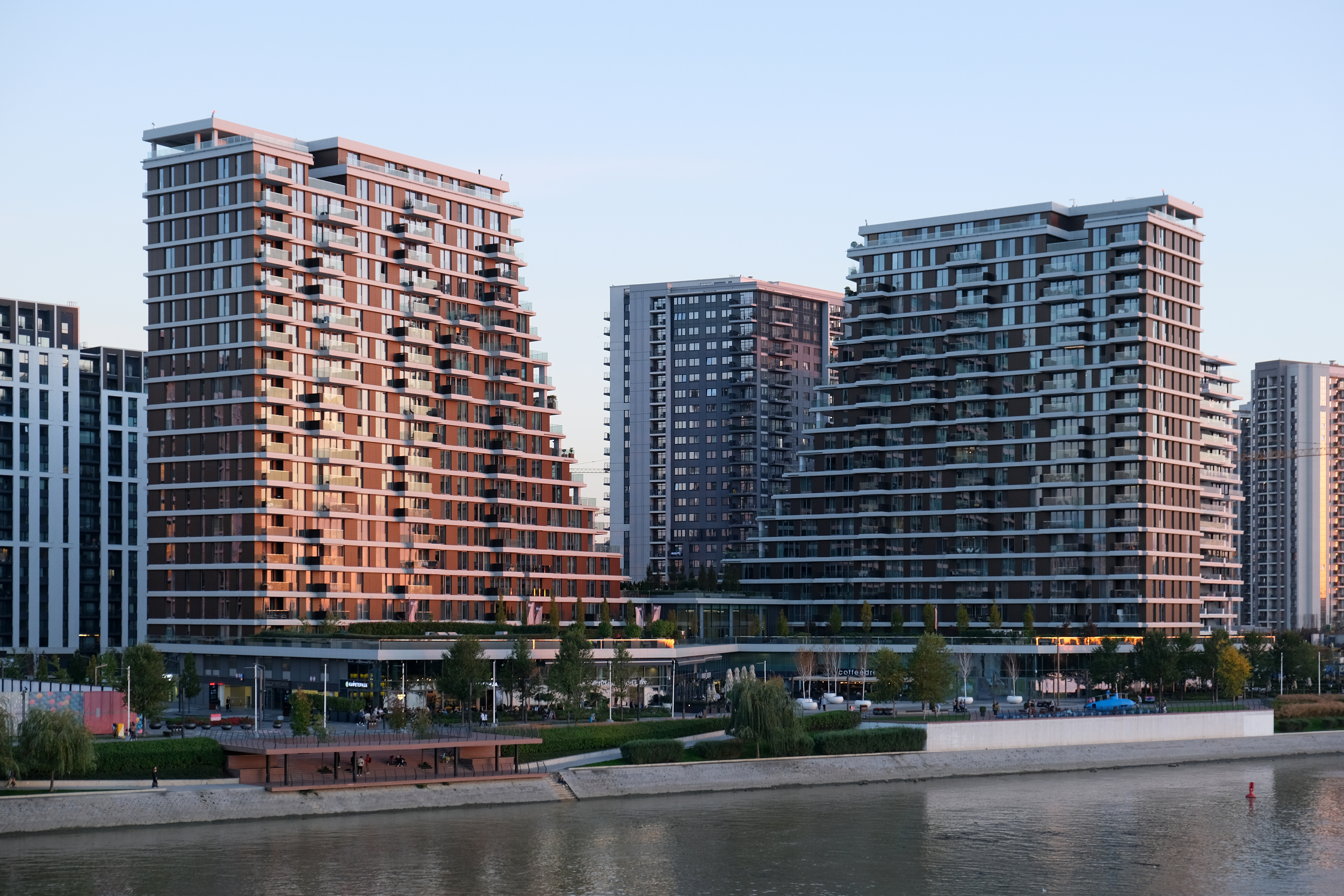
Beograd na vodi

== Names throughout history ==
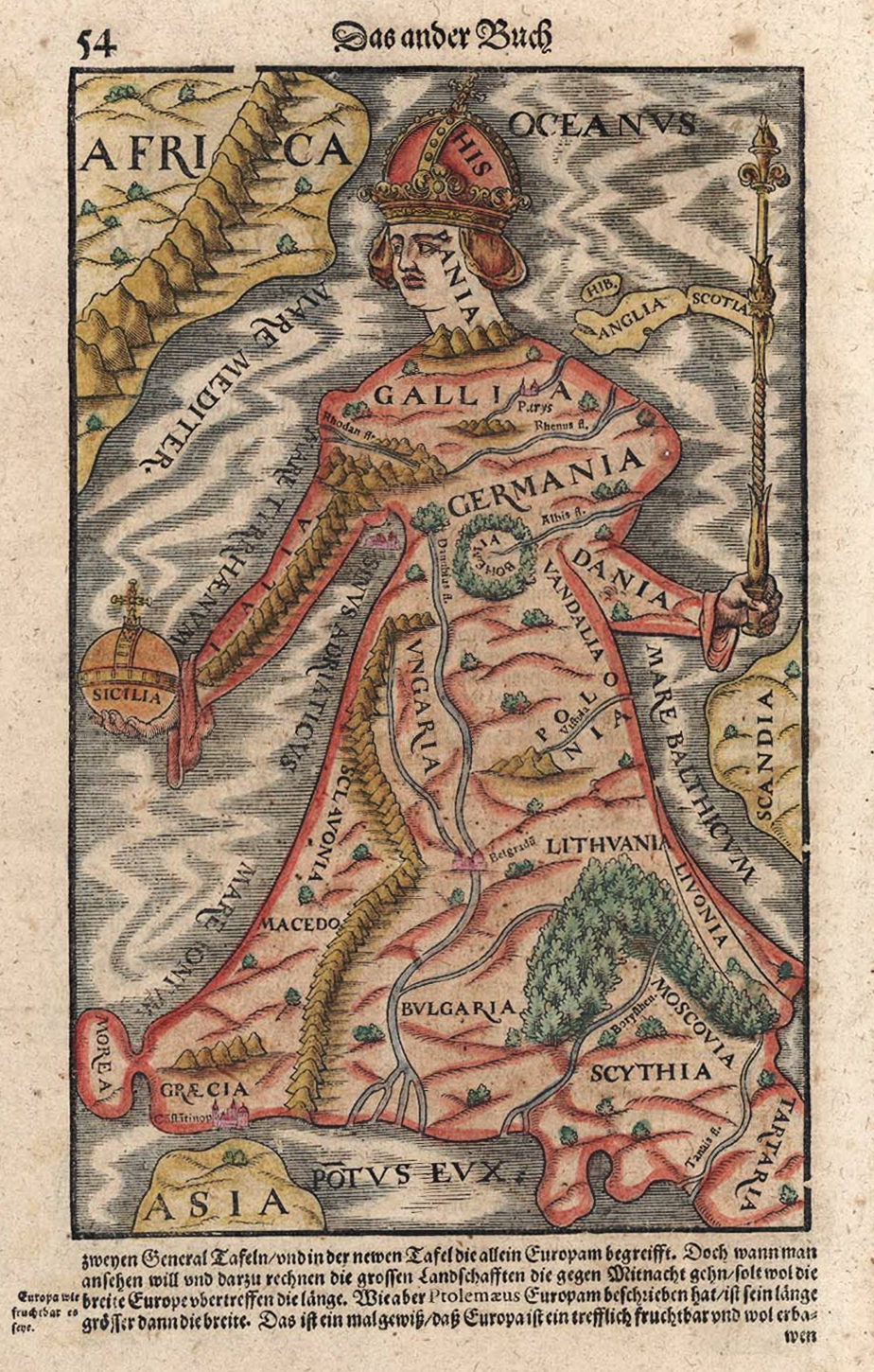
Europa regina map from Münster (1570). Belgrad is one of only 3 cities designated on the map.

Belgrade has had many names through history, and in nearly all languages the name translates as "the white city" or similar. Serbian name Beograd is a compound of beo ("white, light") and grad ("town, city"), and etymologically corresponds to several other city names spread throughout the Slavdom: Belgorod, Białogard, Biograd etc.

Name	Notes
Singidūn(o)-	Named by the Celtic tribe of the Scordisci; dūn(o)- means 'lodgment, enclosure, fort', and for word 'singi' there are 2 theories—one being that it is a Celtic word for circle, hence "round fort", and the other that the name is Paleo-Balkan and originated from the Singi, a Thracian tribe that occupied the area before the Scordisci arrived. Another theory suggests that the Celtic name bears its modern meaning—the White Fort (town).
Singidūnum	Romans conquered the city and Romanized the Celtic name of Singidūn (in turn derived from Paleo-Balkan languages of earlier rulers). Rendered Singidonon (Σιγγιδόνον) in Greek, along with the direct transliteration from Celtic Σιγγιδών.
Beograd, Београд	Slavic name first recorded in 878 as Beligrad in a letter of Pope John VIII to Boris of Bulgaria which translates to "White city/fortress".
Alba Graeca	"Alba" is Latin for "White" and "Graeca" is the possessive "Greek"
Alba Bulgarica	Latin name during the period of Bulgarian rule over the city
Griechisch-Weißenburg	German translation for "Greek White city". Modern German is Belgrad.
Castelbianco	Italian translation for "White castle". Modern Italian is Belgrado.
Nandoralba, Nándorfehérvár, Lándorfejérvár	In medieval Hungary. "Nandor" means Bulgarian and "fehérvár" means white castle in Hungarian. Modern Hungarian is Belgrád.
Velegradhon/Βελέγραδον or Velegradha/Βελέγραδα	Byzantine name. Modern Greek is Veligradhi (Βελιγράδι).
Dar Al Jihad	Arabic name during Ottoman Empire meaning "House of Struggle".
Prinz-Eugenstadt	Planned German name of the city after World War II, if it had remained a part of the Third Reich. The city was to be named after Prince Eugene of Savoy, the Austrian military commander who conquered the city from the Turks in 1717.

== See also ==
- Timeline of Belgrade history
- Military chronology of Belgrade
