= Siege of Belgrade =

Belgrade has been besieged numerous times in its history, Siege of Belgrade or Battle of Belgrade may refer to:

- Siege of Belgrade (1071), Belgrade captured by the Hungarians
- Siege of Belgrade (1440), failed Ottoman siege
- Siege of Belgrade (1456), failed Ottoman siege
- Siege of Belgrade (1521), Belgrade captured by the Ottomans
- Siege of Belgrade (1688), Belgrade captured by the Habsburgs
- Siege of Belgrade (1690), Belgrade captured by the Ottomans
- Siege of Belgrade (1693), failed Habsburg siege
- Siege of Belgrade (1717), Belgrade captured by the Habsburgs
- Siege of Belgrade (1739), Belgrade captured by the Ottomans
- Siege of Belgrade (1787–1788), failed Austrian siege
- Siege of Belgrade (1789), Belgrade captured by the Habsburgs, but returned in the Treaty of Sistova (1791)
  - The poem The Siege of Belgrade, about the 1789 siege, by Alaric Alexander Watts
  - The opera The Siege of Belgrade (1791) by Stephen Storace
- Blockade of Belgrade (1804–1806), by Serbian rebels
- Siege of Belgrade (1806), Belgrade captured by the Serbs
- Bombardment of Belgrade (1914), an attack carried out by Austria-Hungary on Belgrade
- Fall of Belgrade (1915), Belgrade captured by the Austro-Hungarians and Germans
- Belgrade offensive (1944), Belgrade captured by the Red Army and Yugoslav Partisans
