= Old Sava Bridge =

Bridge in Belgrade, Serbia

Old Sava Bridge Стари савски мост Stari savski most
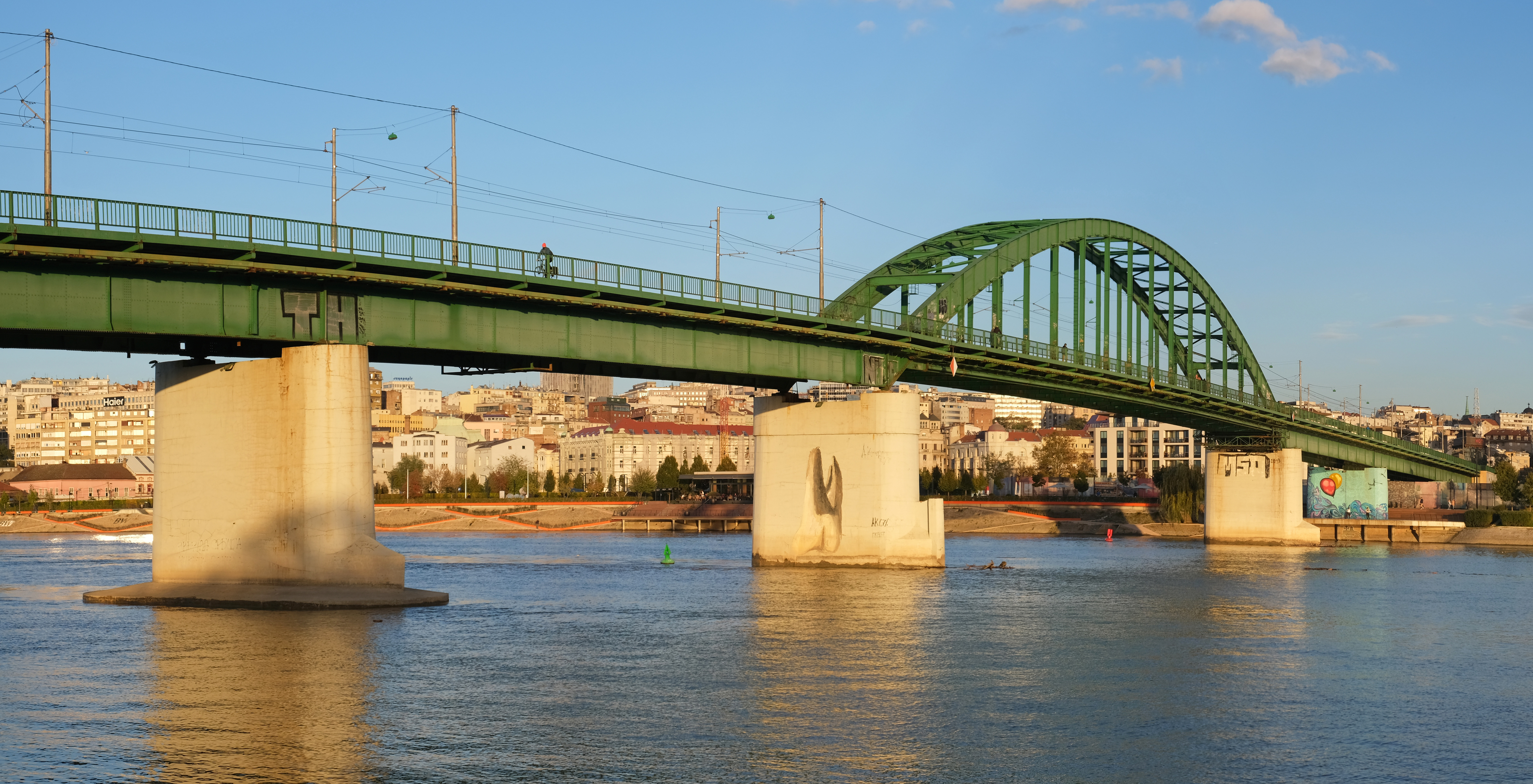
- Old Sava Bridge in 2023
- Coordinates: 44°48′39″N 20°26′52″E
- Crossed: Sava river
- Maintained by: Putevi Srbije

Characteristics
- Total length: 430 m (1,410 ft)
- Width: 40 m (130 ft)
- Longest span: 157 m (515 ft)

History
- Opened: 1942; 84 years ago
- Demolished: 2025; 1 year ago

Statistics
- Toll: No

Location
- Interactive map of Old Sava Bridge; Стари савски мост Stari savski most

The Old Sava Bridge (Serbian: Стари савски мост, romanized: Stari savski most) was a 430-metre-long (1,410 ft) and 40-metre-wide (130 ft) bridge, crossing the river Sava in Belgrade, Serbia. It was the smallest road bridge in the Serbian capital and was used both for car and tram traffic. The main span between the two pillars of this tied arch bridge was over 157 m (515 ft) in length. Two bus lines and three tram lines of Belgrade public transport used the bridge.

Due to its history, the bridge had an important place and role in Belgrade's skyline and memory, and was considered by many citizens as one of the city symbols. However, in 2016, the city administration decided to demolish it and build a more modern bridge, to complement the Belgrade Waterfront project nearby. Both the experts and the public opposed these plans, forcing the city to reconsider them several times (suggested options included an expansion, an upgrade, a demolition, and a relocation). Many citizens voted online to relocate the bridge onto dry land within the Ušće Park and keep it there as a tourist attraction. Many others claimed this vote was not representative of what most citizens desired. After all consultations were completed, the bridge was finally demolished in May 2025.

== Name ==
During the World War II, Germans called the bridge "Prince Eugen". After 1945, citizens called it simply "German bridge" or "Schwabian bridge" and, as other bridges were built across the Sava, the name "Old Sava bridge" replaced it. Today, after almost 35 years of tram traffic over it, many Belgraders colloquially call it the "Tram bridge". None of the names were official.

A citizens association called "Imamo plan" with the support of the Savski Venac municipality is collected signatures for the initiative of naming the bridge after Miladin Zarić, the brave teacher who saved it. City commission which names the city streets, squares and bridges, in early 2017 neither accepted nor rejected the proposal.

== History ==
=== Construction and World War II ===
The bridge was built in 1942, during the German occupation, because the only remaining bridge crossing the river Sava at that time was demolished. For that reason, the purpose of the bridge was transportation between the two river banks. The construction of the bridge was planned to be installed over the Tisa river near Žabalj, but the demolition of the King Aleksandar bridge by the Germans during the bombing of Belgrade on 6 April 1941, led to the installation of the construction over the eight pillars on the Sava river. It was cut in pieces and transferred to Belgrade. The bridge was projected and built by the de:C.H. Jucho company from Dortmund, Germany. The steel, half-parabolic, supporting construction was placed on temporary wooden sheet piles and the bridge was completely finished in six months. Due to the light construction, the bridge was still inadequate for the heavy machinery and vehicles, so Germans decided to repair the Old Railway Bridge.

It was the only big European bridge that was not demolished during the German withdrawals. The Ludendorff Bridge across the Rhine, famed "bridge at Remagen", Germans also failed to destroy, but it was so damaged, that it collapsed in March 1945, soon after being captured by the Allies.

In October 1944, the German Army started to retreat from Belgrade and on their way, they planned to mine the bridge. Miladin Zarić, a teacher who lived near the bridge, watched for several days where Germans placed the explosives. On 20 October, as the Red Army approached, he went to the bridge and decided to risk his life and save the only connection between Central Serbia and Syrmia. Under the third pillar he noticed wooden casings filled with explosives and the fuse was already burning. He grabbed the spade, but it wasn't enough to cut the wire. He then took bloody bayonet which was next to the dead German soldier nearby and repeatedly hit the fuse until he cut the wire.

Zarić then noticed three fires on the Zemun side of the bridge. As he couldn't extinguish the fire himself, he called Red Army soldiers and a group of 12 soldiers from the guard's firing regiment, headed by major Nikanor Kornyeyevich Tkachenko, responded. The Soviets fought through across the bridge, forming a bridgehead on the other side. German artillery was heavily shelling the bridge in an effort to destroy it. In a bit over one hour they fired some 350 105 mm (4.1 in) shells, but only three actually hit the bridge, not causing any major damage. German artillery batteries were then silenced by the incoming Soviet artillery and attack aviation. After this, the bridge remained as the only operational bridge in Belgrade.

Full demining of the bridge was also conducted by the Red Army. All accesses to the bridge were heavily fortified, so the only available approach was via the river. Soviet ships of the Danube Flotilla reached Belgrade at this time, sailing from the Black Sea upstream the Danube and demining the river in process. They were sent to the Sava bridge, and in the blitz operation, the sailors and deminers boarded under the bridge construction, overpowered the Wehrmacht soldiers on the bridge itself, and removed the explosive charges. This allowed for the Yugoslav and Soviet forces to cross to the Sava's left bank in the night of 20/21 October 1944. The operation was organized and conducted by Aleksey Alekseyevich Matushkin and Grigory Nikolayevich Okhirmenko.

=== Reconstructions ===
The bridge had a wooden driveway until 1964, when the planners suggested the reconstruction of the bridge to the mayor Branko Pešić. After a five-year reconstruction a new concrete panel was placed in 1969. After opting against the construction of metro, despite developing the project for over a decade, in 1984 the tramway tracks were laid over the bridge and the concrete panel was replaced with the steel one.

The traffic on the bridge has always been minor compared to the other bridges crossing the river, especially until the 1990s, due to the bad access to the bridge on the Novi Beograd side. It was one of the main reasons why the vast reconstruction of the bridge did not start until 13 October 2007 and was finished on 31 March 2008. The reconstruction included new traffic signals, poured asphalt, fences and decorative lighting. The capacity of the bridge was increased to 30,000 vehicles per day.

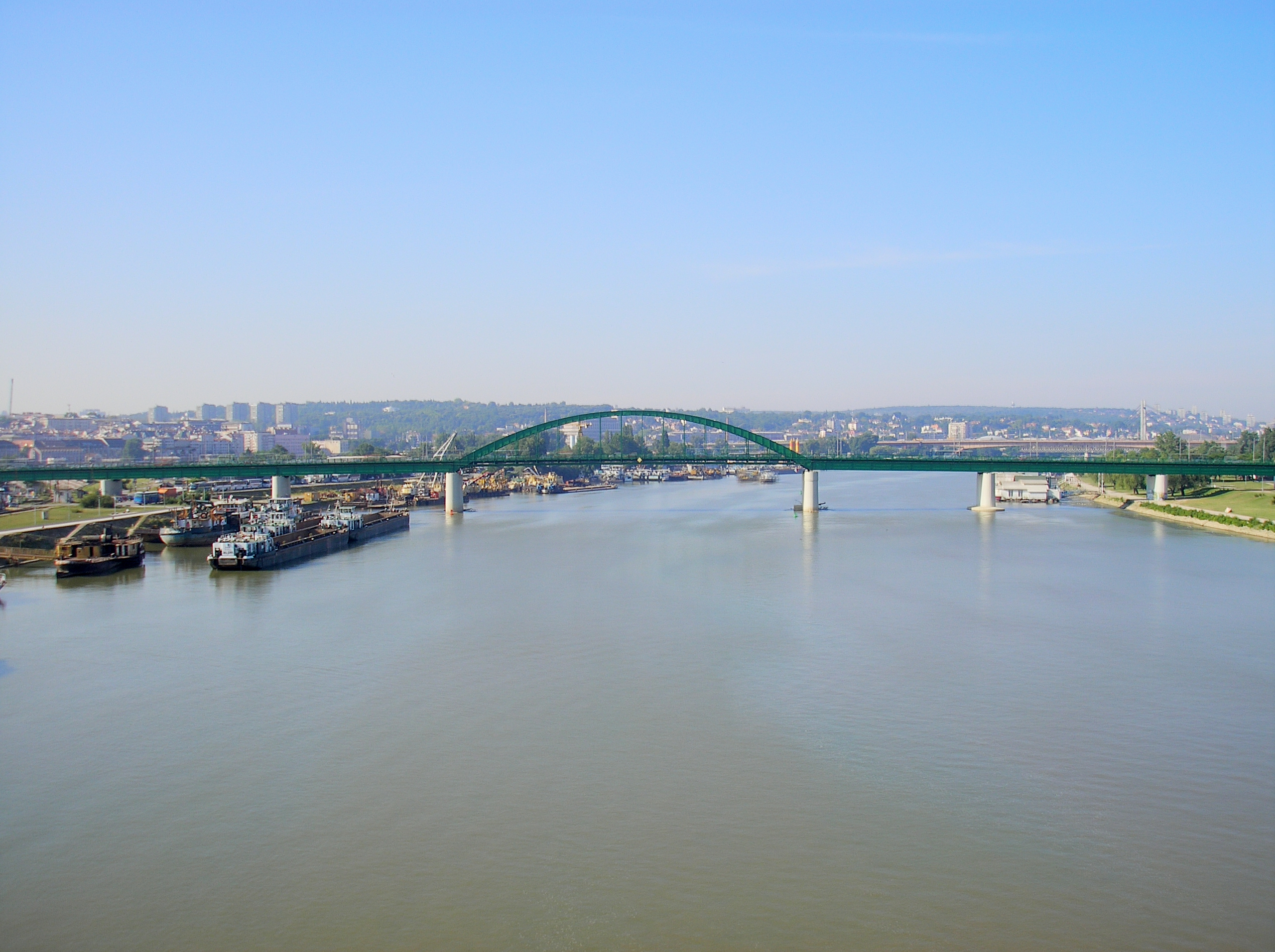
Old Sava Bridge seen from Branko's Bridge

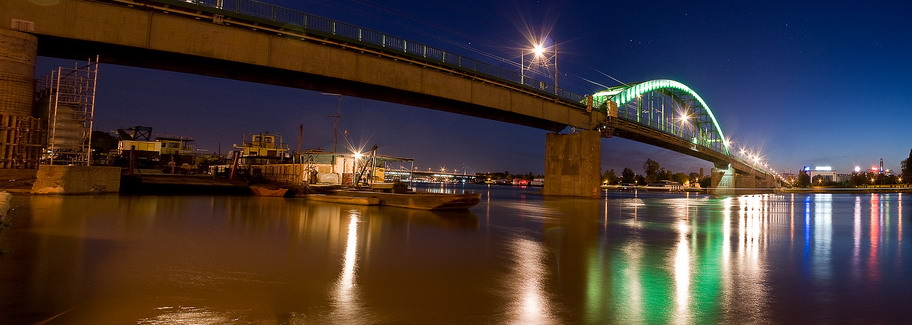
Bridge at night

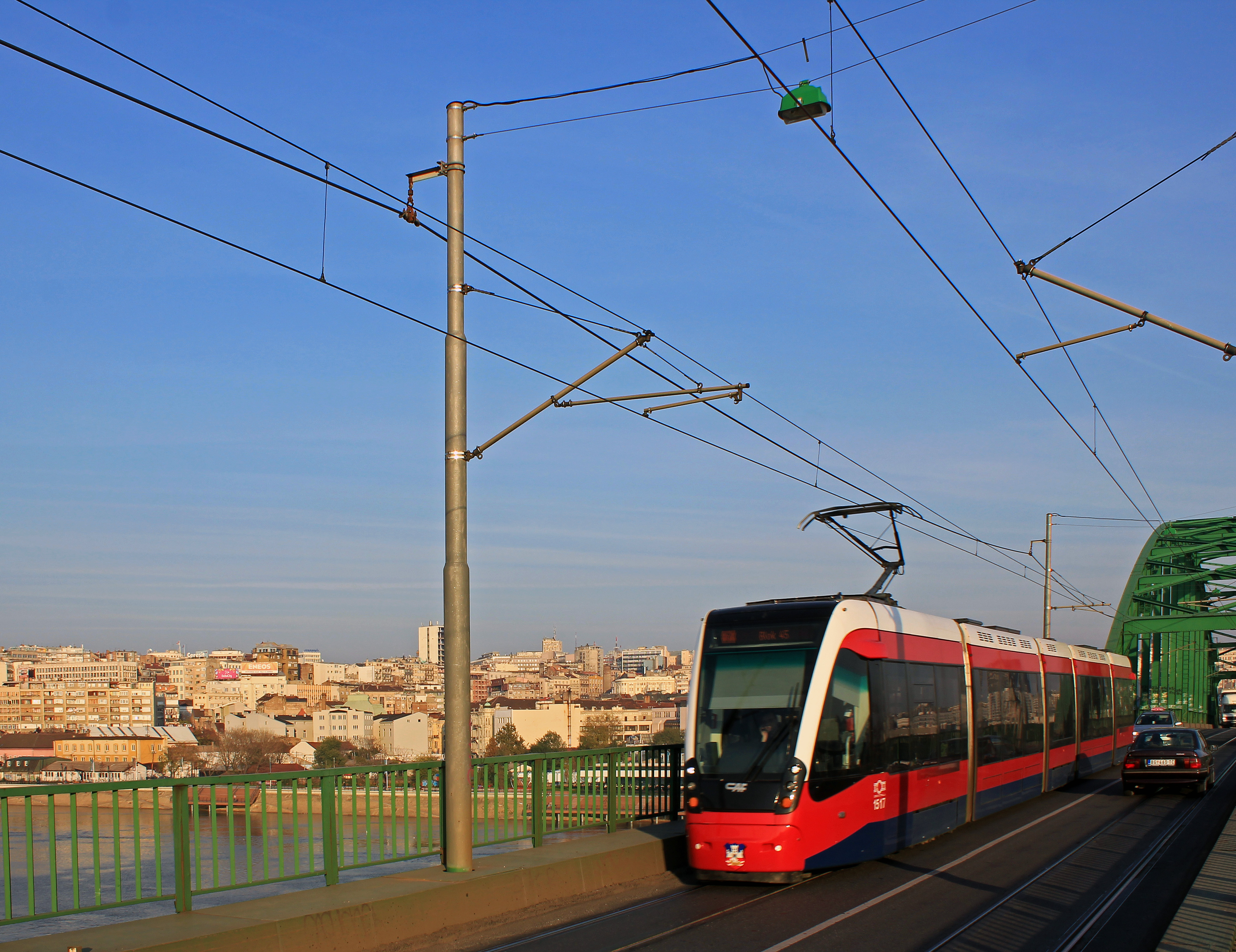
Tram crossing the bridge

=== Planned demolition ===
==== 2010s ====
In March 2016, mayor of Belgrade Siniša Mali announced the massive reconstruction of the bridge, slated to begin in the late 2017. In the next 15 months, both Mali and the city architect, Milutin Folić, explained that the project was to include the widening of the bridge with one extra car lane in each direction and separate tram tracks. The metallic arch construction was supposed to be cut and elevated above the traffic lanes, effectively making the bridge on two levels and the documentation asked for the bridge's specific metal arch to be preserved. Upper level was to be turned into the pedestrian and bicycle paths with lush vegetation. Ending constructions were to be replaced and instead of the main bridge span one pillar with the joint beam was projected. Width of the navigation path on the Sava river at the bridge's main span was to remain the same. They named the Tehran's Tabiat Bridge as an inspiration, as Mali just returned from the official visit to Tehran.

However, in May 2017, after the city publicized the project papers, it was obvious that all the time they wanted to demolish the bridge completely and build a new one, even though they publicly talked about the reconstruction. Mali and Folić now claimed that the bridge was obsolete, unsuitable for traffic, with rotten wooden piles and obstructing the river traffic. Former condition, that the arch must be preserved was watered down into the suggestion that the new bridge should resemble the old one, but a day later Folić said that it is just a recommendation and that city doesn't have to follow it, also trivializing the bridge itself labeling it "just one of many generic German bridges". Citizens objected immediately, organizing a petition and claiming that the bridge has a traditional and historic value, as the only bridge that Germans wanted to destroy during the war, but failed to do so.

Engineer Ljuba Kostić, who constructed several bridges, including the Pavlovića Ćuprija on the Drina, criticized the project. He said that if the bridge didn't obstruct the river traffic for 75 years, it will not start now, plus, the other bridges in Belgrade area, in Obrenovac, Ostružnica (both on the Sava) and Pupin Bridge (on the Danube), all have pylons in the river and none of them prevents the traffic. He also addressed the wooden piles, saying that they are made of oak wood which is protected and can last almost forever. Plus, there are techniques to preserve them anyway, citing the example of Venice in Italy, which is mostly built on wooden piles. He also considers that the steel construction is an advantage, as the bridge can easily be widened, like the Branko's Bridge was in the 1950s, plus the bridge has a historic value. Architect Branislav Jovin, who projected and reconstructed many of the Belgrade's landmark features (original Belgrade Metro project, Mostar interchange, Autokomanda, Knez Mihailova) considers that the bridge is not important for the traffic anyway, but it could be a pedestrian one. They both agreed that the city government is throwing money on unnecessary projects.

In another confusing statement by the city architect Folić, he said that the bridge will not be removed, that it will remain at the same place, but it will get a new shape, repeating what he was saying previous year and a half. A commission will decide whether they will keep the existing arch or the bridge would look completely different. Folić admitted that the city's Institute for the culture monuments protection suggested for the original arch to be preserved, but he personally is confident that the commission will take in account that it is an architecturally unimportant German military bridge which, Folić is sure, will soon become unsafe. A new project of the futuristic white bridge was unveiled on 15 June 2017. Mayor Mali stated that the old bridge will not be demolished, but moved to another location which is still not chosen, as a pedestrian bridge. However, engineer Aleksandar Bojović, who was a member of the jury which chose to demolish to old bridge and selected the new one, said that comprehensive analysis is needed to see how it will be dismantled and moved, that a new location has to be selected and whether it will be profitable.

Kostić, also president of the citizens association "Our bridges", pointed out that the original idea of widening the bridge would cost half of what the chosen project will cost in the end. In her essay, Aleksandra Pavićević from the Institute of Ethnography of the Serbian Academy of Sciences and Arts called the planned demolition "autodestructive" and "deranged, dissipating idea". Architect Dragoljub Bakić noted that, while the expansion of the bridge would be the most expensive and complicated solution, why is the problem building the twin bridge next to it. Based on what some of the city officials said, Bakić concludes they don't want to have clinking, noisy trams passing next to their luxurious pet project, Belgrade Waterfront.

Mali announced that the citizens will decide where to move the bridge, but his idea was to move it to Zemun, as the pedestrian bridge to the protected area of the Great War Island. Aleksandar Milenković, member of the Academy of Architecture of Serbia, opposed the motion, expressing fear of "synchronous ad hoc decisions of the administration", and that seemingly benign idea is actually a strategically disastrous enterprise concerning the protected wildlife on the island. He suspected that the administration in this case, just as in all previous ones, will neglect the numerous theoretical and empirical guidelines. In December 2017, the works on the bridge were pushed from 2018 to the spring of 2019. As the contract for the conceptual design was signed only in February 2018 and the deadline is set in 10 months, the construction was pushed to the second half of 2019, despite the continuing criticism of the entire idea of demolishing and relocating the old bridge. Only then the cost will be known, too. Also, the project was described as a blatant copy of the Sheikh Zayed Bridge in Abu Dhabi.

Deputy mayor Goran Vesić announced in August 2018 that the removal of the bridge will start on 1 June 2019, after the installation of the tram tracks across the Ada Bridge is finished. In March 2019, city urbanist Marko Stojčić said that the bridge will be placed as an extension of the Omladinskih Brigada Street, in the New Belgrade's Block 70-A, and that it will connect it with Ada Ciganlija. Deadline for the completion of the works was set to 2021. In May 2019 the demolition was postponed for 2020. The new location was also chosen by the citizens on a partial popular vote in 2017.

In July 2019, however, Stojčić said that the citizens will again vote for the new location, as the city administration finally admitted the original concerns that the relocation will be complicated and pricey. It would include cutting of the bridge in three parts, thorough reconstruction and elevation on the higher post. It was estimated that this entire operation would cost more than a construction of a completely new pedestrian bridge on that location. Stojčić then pushed the idea of just dragging the bridge on dry land in the neighborhood of Ušće, where it would be embellished with greenery while the shops will be built under the "dry bridge". He described the location as the "green area without useful value", so that no one would complain. It was estimated that, if everything went well, the new bridge won't be finished before 2022.

In August 2019 it was announced that the new bridge will be built next to the existing one, and that Old Sava Bridge will remain in place until the new bridge is completed. A series of contradictory statements from Vesić and Stojčić ensued. They variously claimed that citizens already voted for the bridge to relocate to Ušće, that citizens will vote in the future, that previous vote was long time ago so the citizens should vote again, etc. Experts continued to oppose the project, especially since the bridge is fully functional. The voting was debunked as being rigged and missing the option of leaving the bridge where it is, while the opposition parties claimed they will physically prevent demolition of the bridge. In December 2019 city announced that, with 3,454 votes (or 0.2% of total Belgrade population) against 2,836, the more expensive idea of relocation on dry land was chosen.

==== 2020s ====
In December 2019, though not having a jurisdiction over the issue, State Institute for the Protection of Cultural Monuments supported the initiative for placing the bridge under the legal protection. In April 2020, during the outbreak of the coronavirus, Stojčić said that the project is moved to 2021–2022, not just because of the pandemic, but because the construction is not ready anyway. In October 2020 he added that the new bridge will be built concurrently, while the old bridge will be cut in three pieces and transported by the river to "some lot in Palilula", temporarily. On the other side, legal process for the protection of the bridge began. In September 2021 Stojčić said the bridge will be demolished in 2022, when the construction of new bridge starts.

By August 2022, city proposed that the new bridge should be constructed concurrently with the roundabout and the Savamala-Palilula tunnel, a massive project which should be in the extension of the bridge's thoroughfare. However, this project includes demolition of the Savamala section at the tunnel's entry point, and relocation of, by the mid-2022 still unknown, number of residents. In November 2022, the government took a loan for demolition of the old bridge, and construction of the new one. The cost of the entire project was said to be €94 million, of which €80 million will come from this credit. Construction works were awarded to the Power China International Group Limited, without any transparent or legally mandatory procedure. Former mayor Dragan Đilas (2008-2012) and city chief architect Đorđe Bobić defended the old bridge, but the new mayor, Aleksandar Šapić, was adamant to demolish it. Also, when the project was announced in 2017, the price was set to much lesser €58 million. Šapić caused further backlash saying he doesn't care what will happen with the old bridge after the demolition and called it a valueless "Nazi bridge", while activists reacted by painting a mural on bridge's pilar on the New Belgrade side, representing Miladin Zarić, who prevented Nazis from demolishing the bridge in 1944.

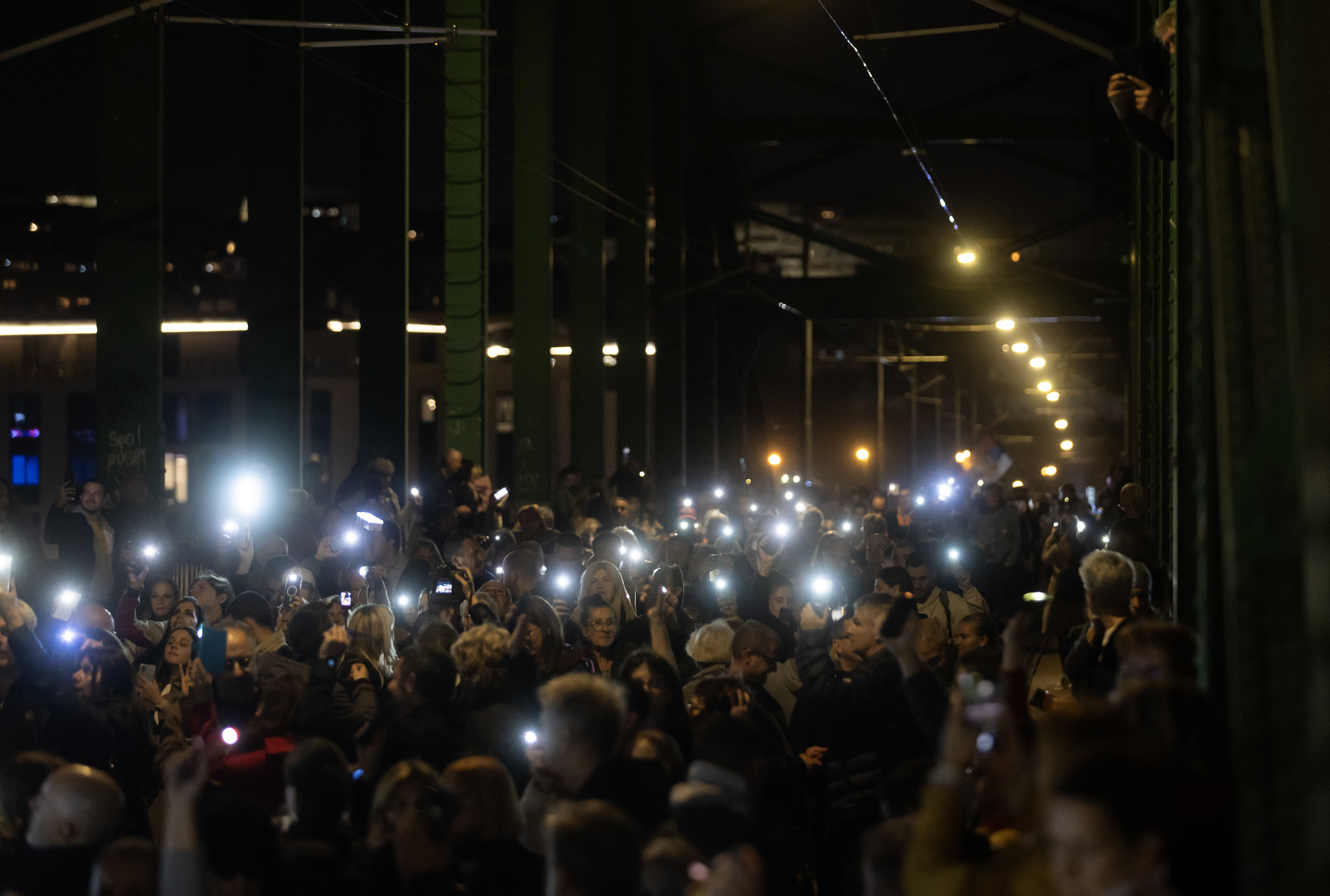
People protesting against the removal of the bridge on 31 October 2024

Šapić, who during the election campaign adamantly called Zarić a hero who deserves a monument, now claimed that "he thinks we should make it up to this man and erect some monument or maybe to name something after him". Former deputy mayor Vesić authored a piece, essentially denouncing Zarić. He claimed that Zarić done nothing, and that Soviets demined the bridge, despite Zarić never claimed he demined the entire bridge, and openly admitted that he noticed Soviet soldiers on the bridge and asked for their help. Vesić also claimed that Belgraders hated the bridge as a symbol of Nazi occupation. He dismissed the fact that Zarić was awarded medals for his action, and not only Yugoslav ones, as Josip Broz Tito's regime propaganda, praising medals awarded to the Soviet soldiers and complaining that "no one asks to name the bridge after them". Vesić added that Zarić's action was suppressed during Yugoslavia because "everyone knew a real story" and that "Zarić myth" developed after the 1978 episode of the popular Povratak otpisanih series, which treated the event.

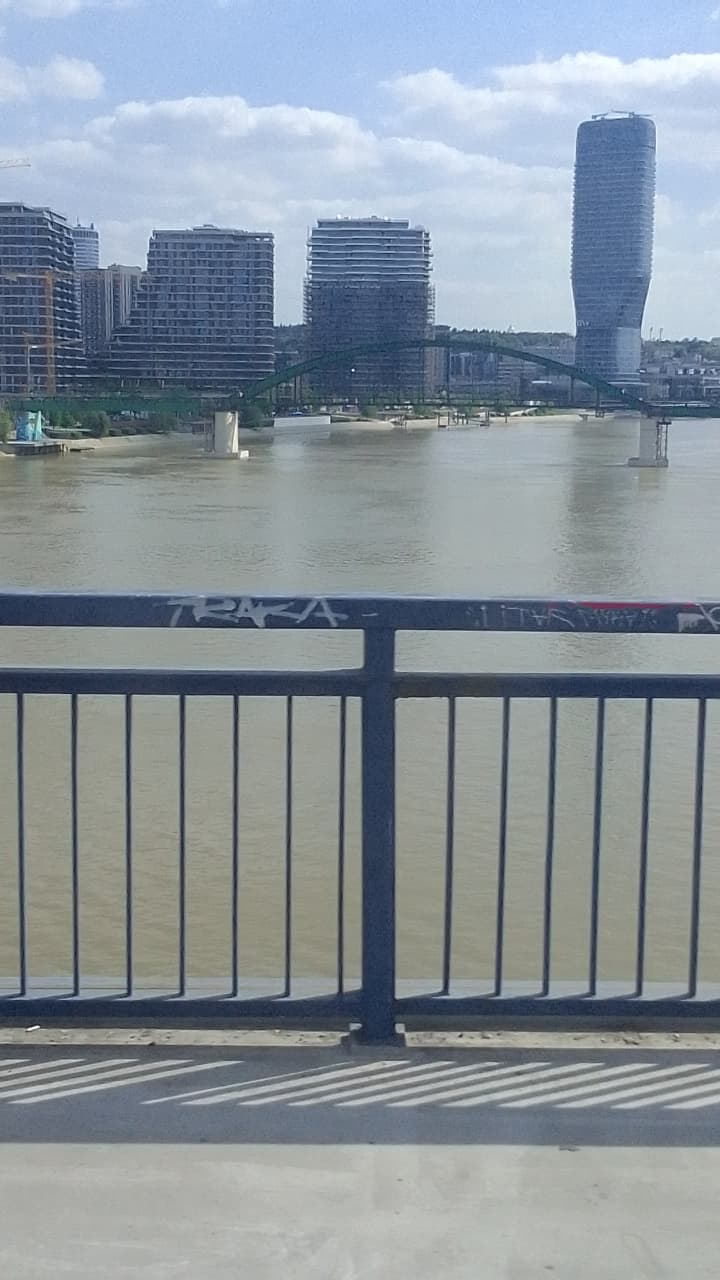
Old Sava Bridge being demolished

On 9 December 2022, Belgrade's new city manager Miroslav Čučković said that the bridge will not be demolished. Instead, the pillars will be expanded, and additional constructions, "two twin brothers", will be added on both sides of the old bridge. In February 2023 Šapić said the bridge will be demolished, cause it is "preventing development of Belgrade", now claiming that it is not safe cause it is cracking due to shaking, and said he is not worried about the citizens protests. Opposition in city parliament asked the BNP Paribas to stop crediting the bridge's demolition. Šapić announced demolition for June 2023, but then postponed it claiming the new bridge will have no purpose without the tunnel. The demolition was then postponed for the spring or summer of 2024, with long preparatory works added as the reason for delay.

Icarus, a group of 300 Russian architects and designers proposed the revitalization of the bridge as the Half-Bridge of Memories, a memorial of the bridge's legacy. Vitaly Stadnikov headed the team which envisioned the bridge as an integral part of the Staro Sajmište memorial complex. It would be indented into the bank (thus not reaching the other bank, and remaining "unfinished"), placed in the axis with the existing monument, and adapted as a glazed passage with 39,000 chimes, representing casualties in the camp Sajmište. In August 2023, President of Serbia Aleksandar Vučić said the "place for the bridge has been already found", connecting Zemun and the Great War Island, and that he will "nominate" the idea to citizens.

The bridge was closed to traffic in November 2024 in preparation for its demolition.

== In popular culture ==
Painter Kosta Hakman painted the bridge in 1948. The painting was simply titled "Bridge in Belgrade", and remained in Hakman's family collection. In May 2021, his daughter Milica Hakman donated the painting to the City Assembly of Belgrade to be exhibited in Stari dvor. Hakman's condition is that the painting must be exhibited in some of the representative quarters of the building, as the bridge is a "symbol of the historical continuity of the capital, but also [a symbol] of love felt by the citizens for their city".

The events of 1944 were dramatized in the TV series Povratak otpisanih, part of the extremely popular Otpisani franchise on underground guerrilla fighters in Belgrade. The story was told in the 12th episode, titled Most ("Bridge"). The episode was aired on 19 March 1978. Miladin Zarić's name was changed to Zaharije S. Jovanović, and he was portrayed by Nikola Milić.

== See also ==
- Belgrade
- Tied-arch bridge
