= Siege of Belgrade (1787–1788) =

There were attempts by the Austrian army to besiege Belgrade, a strategically important city on the Habsburg–Ottoman border, on 2–3 December 1787 and 18 January 1788 that failed. Austria planned to take Belgrade by surprise, before a declaration of war. The operation of taking Belgrade without a fight was always part of Austrian tactics throughout the 18th century.

Emperor Joseph II tasked major general József Alvinczi with taking Belgrade without battle. Alvinczi went to Zemun (opposite Belgrade, Habsburg territory) and conspired with Orthodox priest Nikola Radomirović, Živko Milenković and Jovan Novaković Čardaklija to open the Nebojša Gate, Dizdar Gate in the lower fort and Defterdar Gate between the forts, which they did, on the night of 2–3 December 1787. Serbian Free Corps commander Radič Petrović and Austrian captain Mack with 200 Serb volunteers arrived at the fort foundations with boats on the Sava. The planned 12 Austrian battalions with artillery at Zemun, who were to disarm the Ottoman soldiers sleeping in the barracks and capture the Vizier, never reached due to heavy winds stopping their chaikas. The trio at the gates waited until morning and then saw Austrian signals for aborting the mission. They fled to Syrmia after sabotaging the nearby bastion cannons. Vizier Abdi Pasha investigated and imprisoned defterdar Hüsnü Yusuf, Deli Ahmed and the dizdar of the lower fort.

The second attempt on the night of 18 January that was to dispatch from Syrmia and Ada Ciganlija on the Sava failed as well, due to very bad weather. After declaring war on 9 February, Joseph II allowed Alvinczi to discuss a handover with Deli Ahmed, who was banished to Šumadija. When Deli Ahmed was returned to Belgrade he called a meeting with Alvinczi but instead attacked and nearly killed him in an ambush. Plans to take Belgrade were put on a halt, while the Serbs fought in the interior.

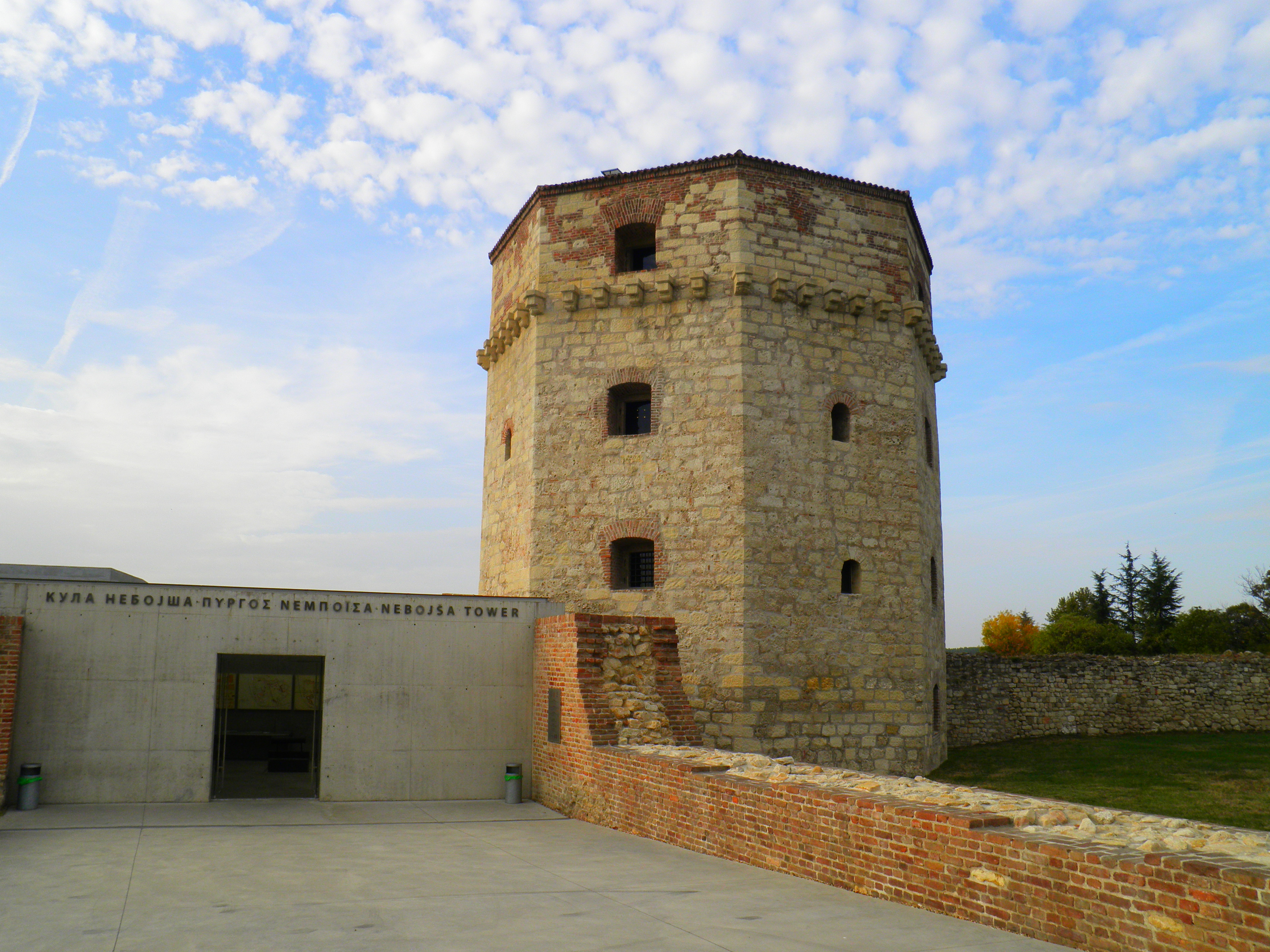
Nebojša Tower

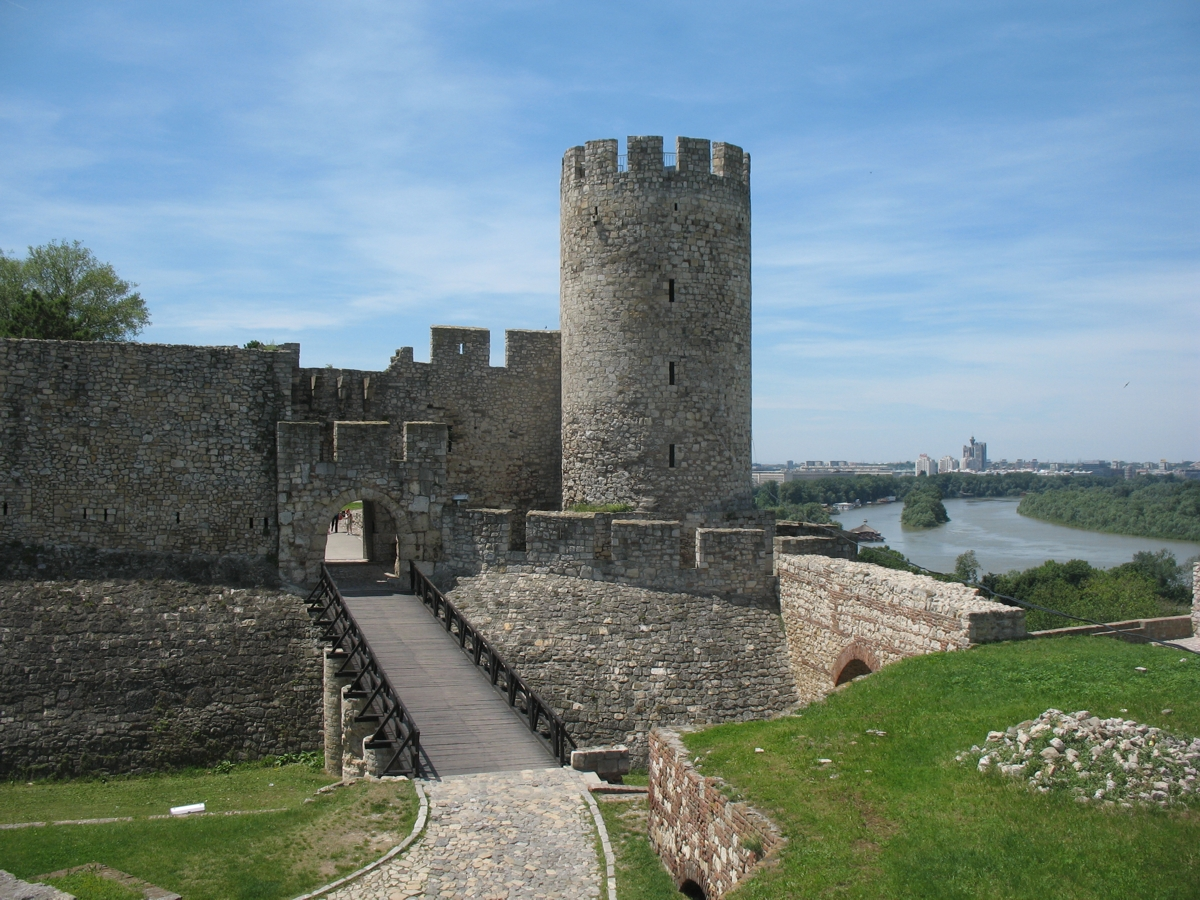
Dizdar/Despot's Gate

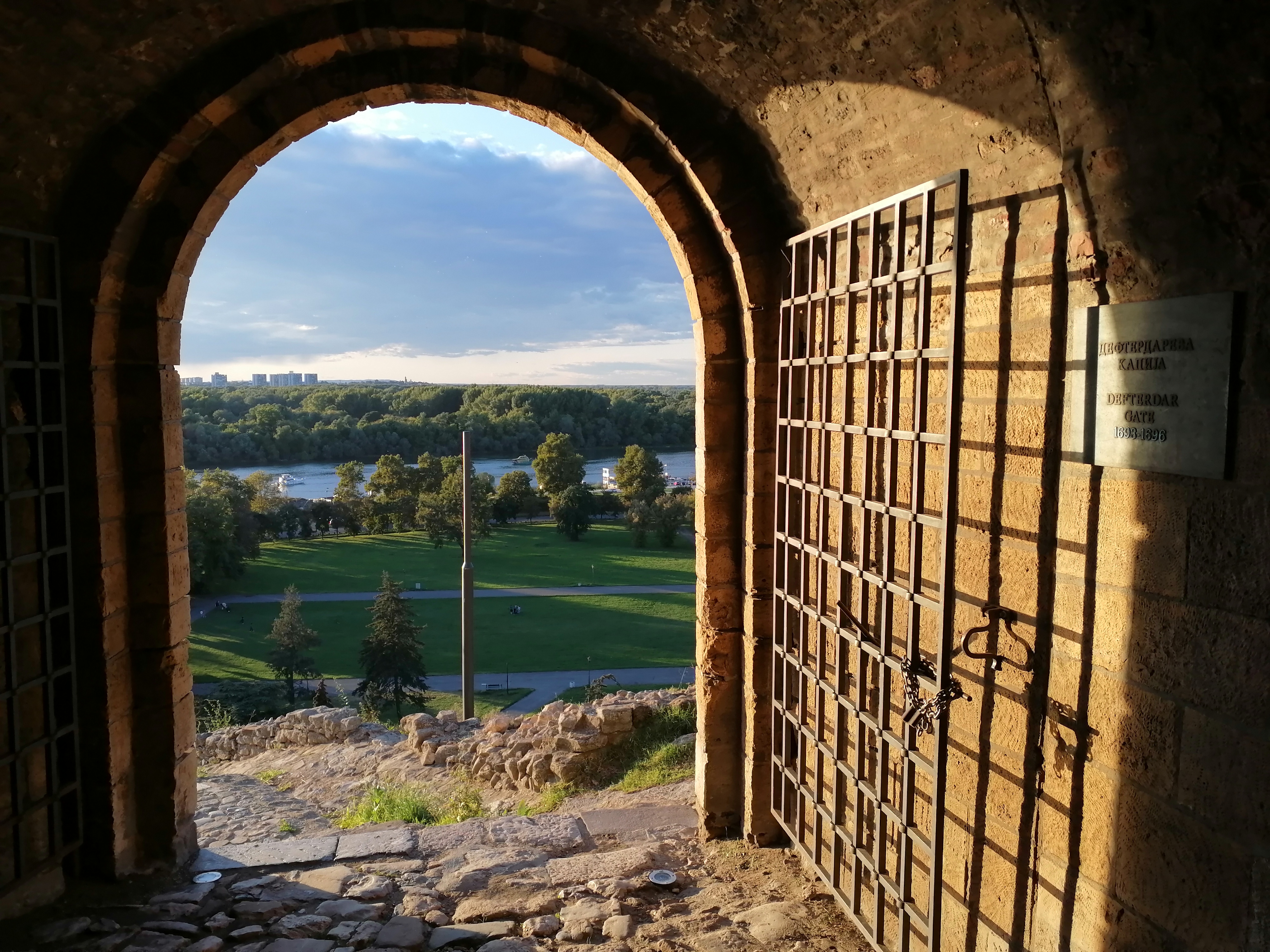
Defterdar Gate

== See also ==
- Belgrade Fortress
- Gates of Belgrade

== Sources ==
- Antonić, Z., ed. (1995). "БЕОГРАД ПРЕД СРПСКУ РЕВОЛУЦИЈУ 1804. ГОДИНЕ: Последњн аустро-турски рат 1788-1791: Кочина крајина". Историја Београда. Beograd: САНУ. pp. 134–137.
- Gavanski, Đorđe (1979). "Непознати извор о покушају заузимања Београда почетком 1788. године" (PDF). ГОДИШЊАК. XXVI. Музеј града Београда: 65-.
- Pantelić, Dušan (1921). "Аустријски покушаји за освајање Београда 1787 и 1788". Глас Српске краљевске академије. ХСVIII.
