= Miladin Zarić =

- Born: Miladin Zarić; 1889; Kosjerić, Serbia
- Died: 1976 (age 87); Belgrade, SFR Yugoslavia
- Other names: Mišo
- Occupation: Teacher
- Known for: Saved the Old Sava Bridge in Belgrade from demolition by Nazis

Miladin Zarić (1889–1976) was a Serbian and later, Yugoslavian teacher. At the end of World War II and liberation of Belgrade, the capital of Yugoslavia on 20 October 1944, during their retreat, the Nazis have mined the Old Sava Bridge, in order to stop the progress of the Soviet Red Army and the People's Liberation Army of Yugoslavia that were chasing them. They would have got away with it if there was not Miladin Zarić, a school teacher and a plain civilian with a considerable experience in demining gained previously during Balkan Wars and First World War. He saved the bridge from demolition, by cutting the detonator wires, making it the only large bridge in Europe, beside Ludendorff Bridge that the Germans didn't succeed in demolishing while retreating. The importance of his act is even bigger considering that the next bridge connecting Belgrade and Syrmia was in Šabac, 90 kilometers away.

== Life ==
Zarić was born in Seča Reka near Kosjerić, in 1889. He enrolled at the Theological Faculty in Prizren, but because disagreement with Nikolaj Velimirović leaves priesthood and became a teacher. He participated as a reserve officer in the Balkan Wars, when cleared the bridge on the river Šemnica near Bitola, as well as in the First World War, during which he survived the retreat through Albania. For his service in the war, Zarić received gold and a silver medal for bravery "Miloš Obilić" Cross of King Peter I and Memorial medal for the withdrawal of Serbian army through Albania. After the war, he was a teacher in Kovilj and Užice, and later became a head of the primary school in his native Kosjerić, then moved to Žarkovo, the village near Belgrade, and then in elementary school, "Janko Veselinović", in which he worked during World War II. According to the testimony of his disciples, Zarić was a virtuous and noble man, also a dedicated teacher who tried pass his knowledge and positive life values even during the war, regardless of the time of war and the difficulties which are all facing.
