= Milišić's brickyard =

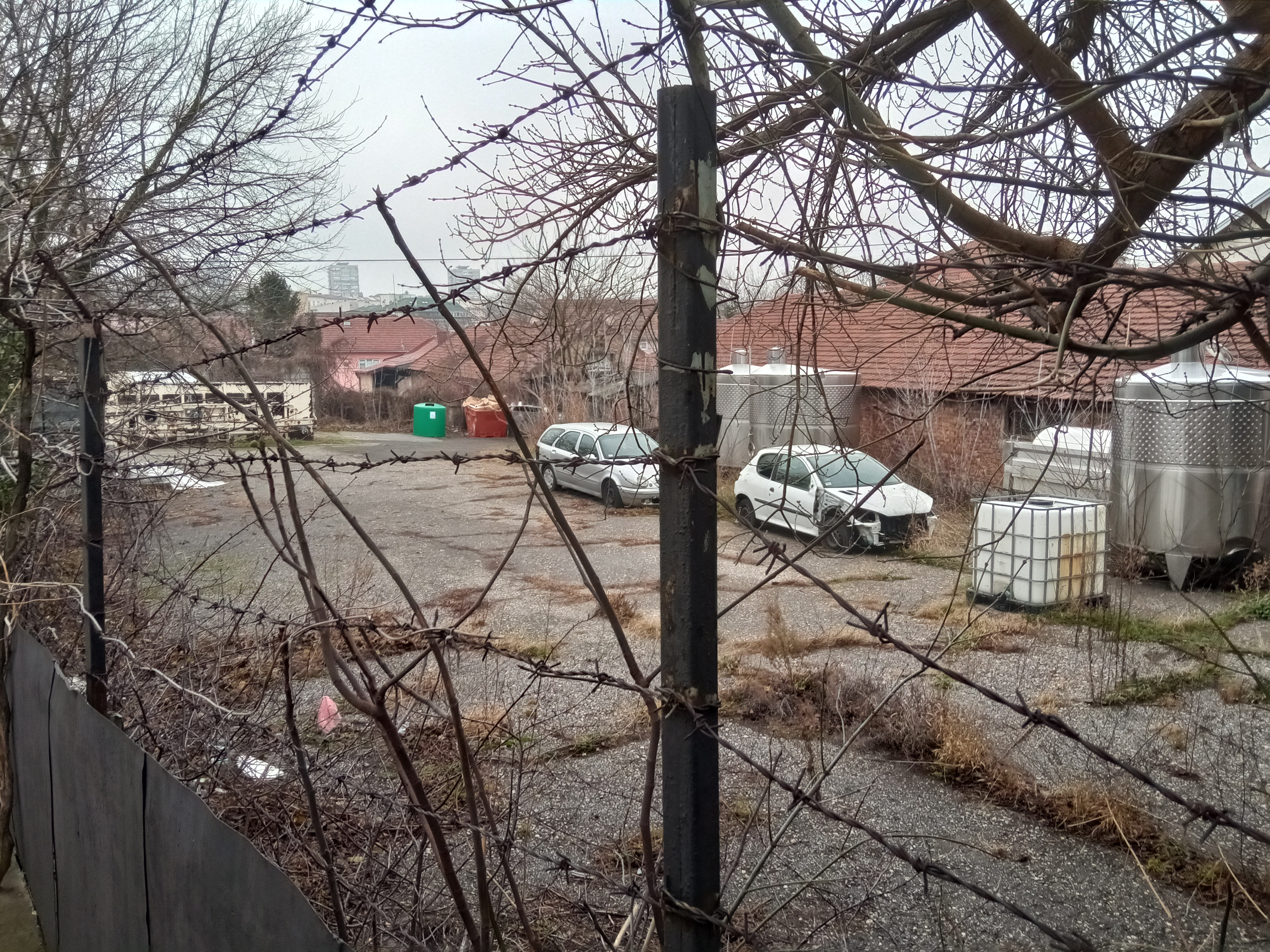
View of the camp's location

Milišić's brickyard (Serbian: Milišićeva ciglana, Милишићева циглана) was one of four concentration camps in Belgrade in occupied Serbia during World War II. Several thousand people were imprisoned in Milišić's brickyard, mostly partisans from Dalmatia and Bosnia, and around 500 of them died in this concentration camp.
