= Military chronology of Belgrade =

Conflicts that took place in Belgrade is a timeline of events that includes wars, battles, skirmishes, major riots and other related items that have occurred on the territory of today's city of Belgrade and resulted in large loss of life or large social political changes

== 21st century ==
No wars.

== 20th century ==
- 5 October 2000 Overthrow of Slobodan Milošević
- 1999 NATO bombing of Yugoslavia
- 1991 1991 protests in Belgrade
- 1944 Belgrade Offensive
- 6–7/8 April 1941 Operation Retribution (1941)
- 27 March 1941 Yugoslav coup d'état
- 1 November 1918 Serbian Campaign of World War I - The Serbs, with help of allies, recapture Belgrade
- 6–9 October 1915: German and Austrian troops capture Belgrade
- 15 December 1914 The Serbs recapture Belgrade
- 2 December 1914 Austrians bombard and capture Belgrade

== 18th century ==
- 15 September – 8 October 1789 Siege of Belgrade (1789)
- 1739 Capture of Belgrade (1739)
- July 22, 1739 Battle of Grocka
- July 16, 1717 – August 17, 1717 Siege of Belgrade (1717)

== 17th century ==
- 1690 Siege of Belgrade (1690)
- 30 July 1688 - 6 September 1688 Siege of Belgrade (1688)

== 16th century ==
- 25 June - 29 August 1521 Siege of Belgrade (1521)

== 15th century ==
- July 4–22, 1456 Siege of Belgrade (1456)

== BC ==
- 34–33 BC the Roman army came to Belgrade and renamed it to Singidunum
- 279 BC Celts conquered the city and named it Singidun
