= Belgrade Tower =

Skyscraper in Belgrade, Serbia

- Кула Београд; Kula Beograd
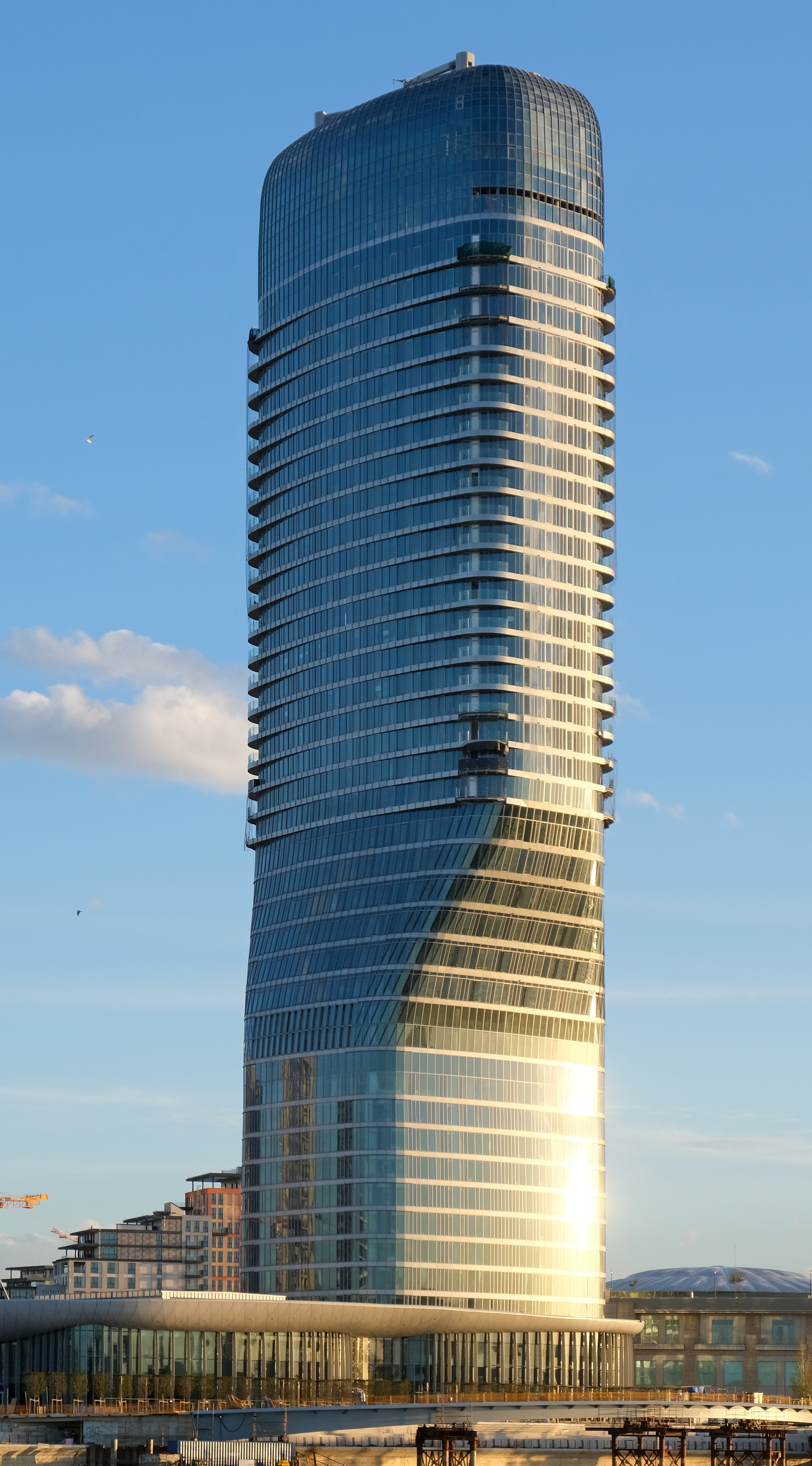
- Alternative names: Kula Belgrade

General information
- Status: Completed in 2024; occupancy-permit application pending as of July 2026
- Type: Mixed-use: hotel, residences and observation deck
- Location: Belgrade Waterfront, Savski Venac, Belgrade, Serbia, Nikolaja Kravcova 1a, 11000 Belgrade
- Groundbreaking: 15 April 2016
- Construction started: February 2019 (main structural works)
- Topped-out: July 2021
- Completed: October 2024 (ceremony only)
- Client: Belgrade Waterfront (BW Kula d.o.o. Beograd)

Height
- Height: 168 m (551 ft)
- Observatory: 41st floor

Technical details
- Structural system: Reinforced-concrete core and frame on a piled raft foundation
- Material: Reinforced and post-tensioned concrete
- Floor count: 42 levels, plus two basement levels
- Floor area: Over 66,700 m^{2} (718,000 sq ft), including the podium and basements

Design and construction
- Architect: Skidmore, Owings & Merrill
- Developer: Eagle Hills
- Engineer: DNEC (FIDIC engineer and site-supervision consultant)
- Structural engineer: Skidmore, Owings & Merrill (foundation design); AECOM (tower structure); DNEC (engineer of record)
- Main contractor: Impresa Pizzarotti-Millennium Team joint venture

Belgrade Tower (Serbian: Кула Београд, romanized: Kula Beograd), officially known as Kula Belgrade, is a 42-floor, 168-meter (551 ft) tall skyscraper as part of the Belgrade Waterfront project in Belgrade, Serbia. It was topped out in 2021 and ceremonially opened in 2024. It is the tallest building in Serbia.

Its lower and upper floor plans are rotated by approximately 90 degrees relative to each other, with the geometric transition occurring between levels 12 and 20 through inclined and branching columns and post-tensioned transfer beams and slabs. The tower is supported by a piled-raft foundation necessitated by the mechanical properties of the upper soil layers; the piling works, performed by Novkol under the supervision of Mace, included 1,200 mm (47 in)-diameter piles beneath the tower and an extensive testing programme that included Osterberg-cell, static, dynamic and pile-integrity tests. The approximately 4,750 m^{3} (168,000 cu ft) concrete raft beneath the tower was poured continuously over about 60 hours in August 2019, after which the central core was raised using hydraulically operated jump-formwork, while post-tensioning was used for most hotel and residential floor slabs. Skidmore, Owings & Merrill developed the architectural concept and initial foundation and structural scheme, while AECOM prepared the second-stage structural design. A local joint venture comprising Energoprojekt Urbanizam i Arhitektura, Energoprojekt Entel and DNEC adapted and checked the design for Serbian approval requirements. The main construction works were carried out by a joint venture of Impresa Pizzarotti and Millennium Team, with DNEC acting as the engineer under the FIDIC contract and BG&E providing structural value-engineering consultancy during construction.

Upon topping out in 2021, it remained the tallest building in the Balkans outside of Turkey by roof height for two years before being surpassed by the 202-meter (663 ft) Sky Fort in Sofia, Bulgaria, in 2023. It remains the second-tallest building in the former Yugoslavia after the 172-meter (564 ft) Avaz Twist Tower in Sarajevo, Bosnia and Herzegovina.

== Overview ==
The Belgrade Tower is located on the bank of the Sava River in the Savamala neighbourhood of Belgrade, within the Belgrade Waterfront development. It stands near the confluence of the Sava and Danube rivers and in proximity to the Belgrade Fortress, with access to the adjacent waterfront promenade.

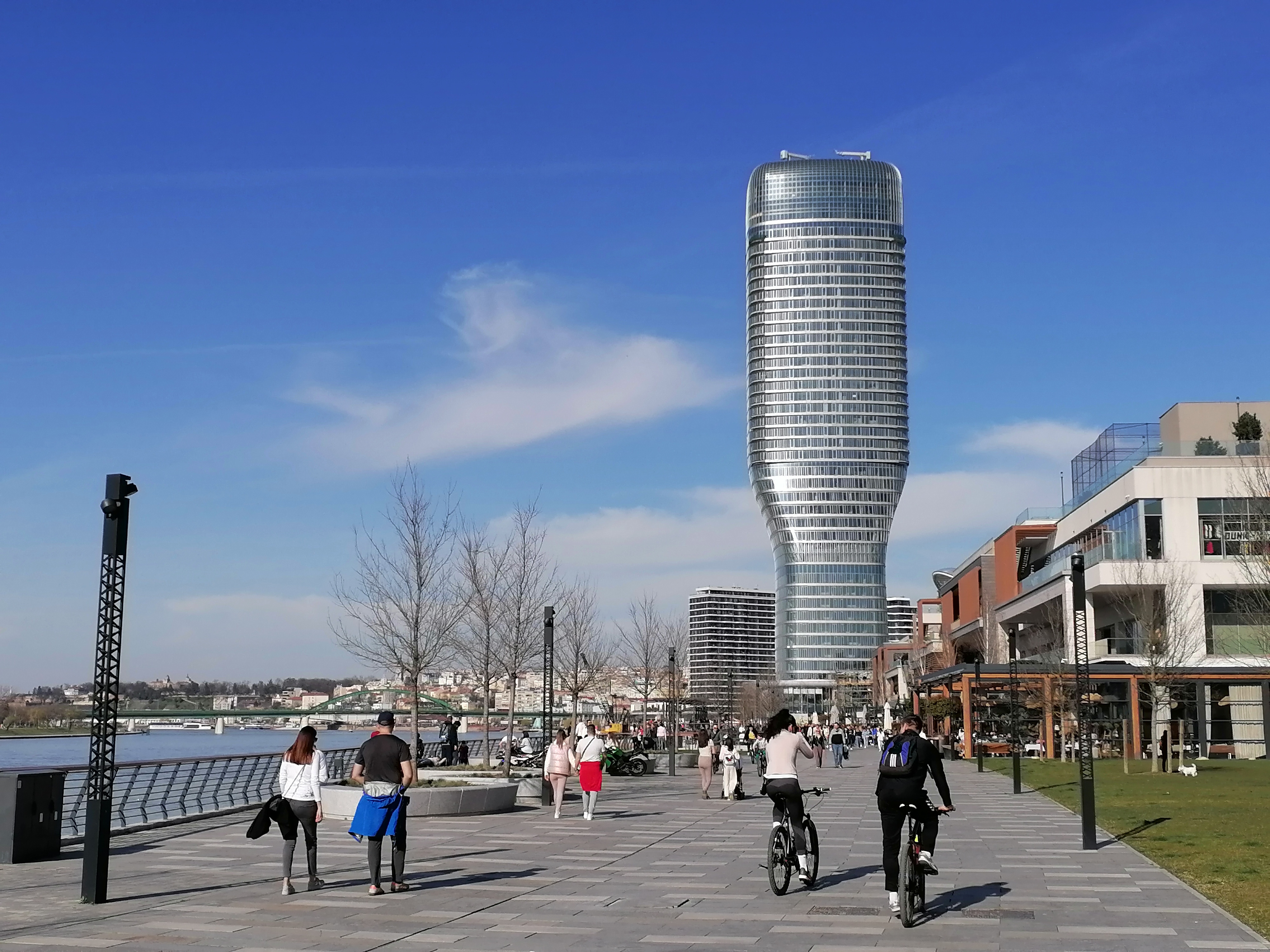

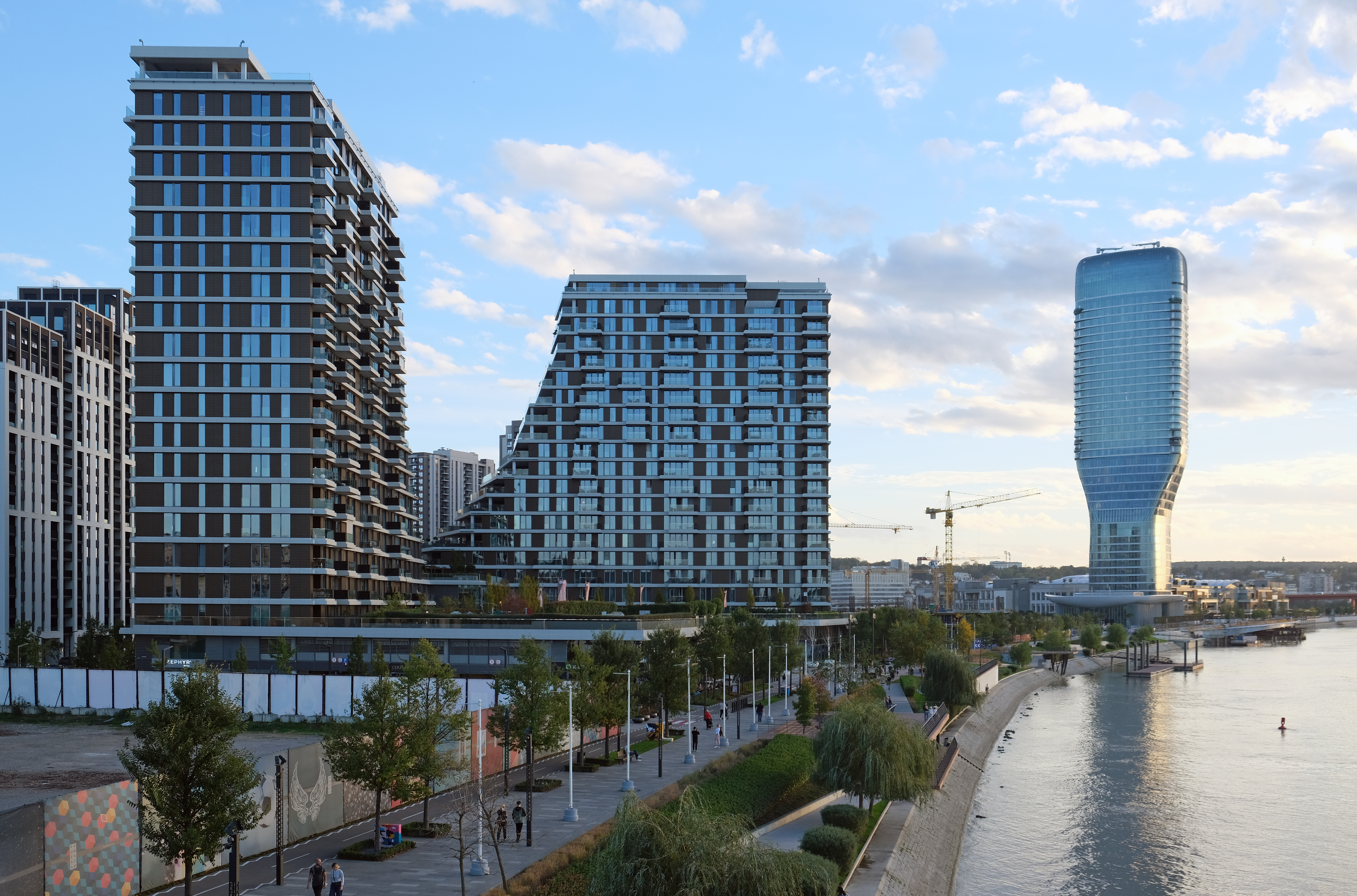

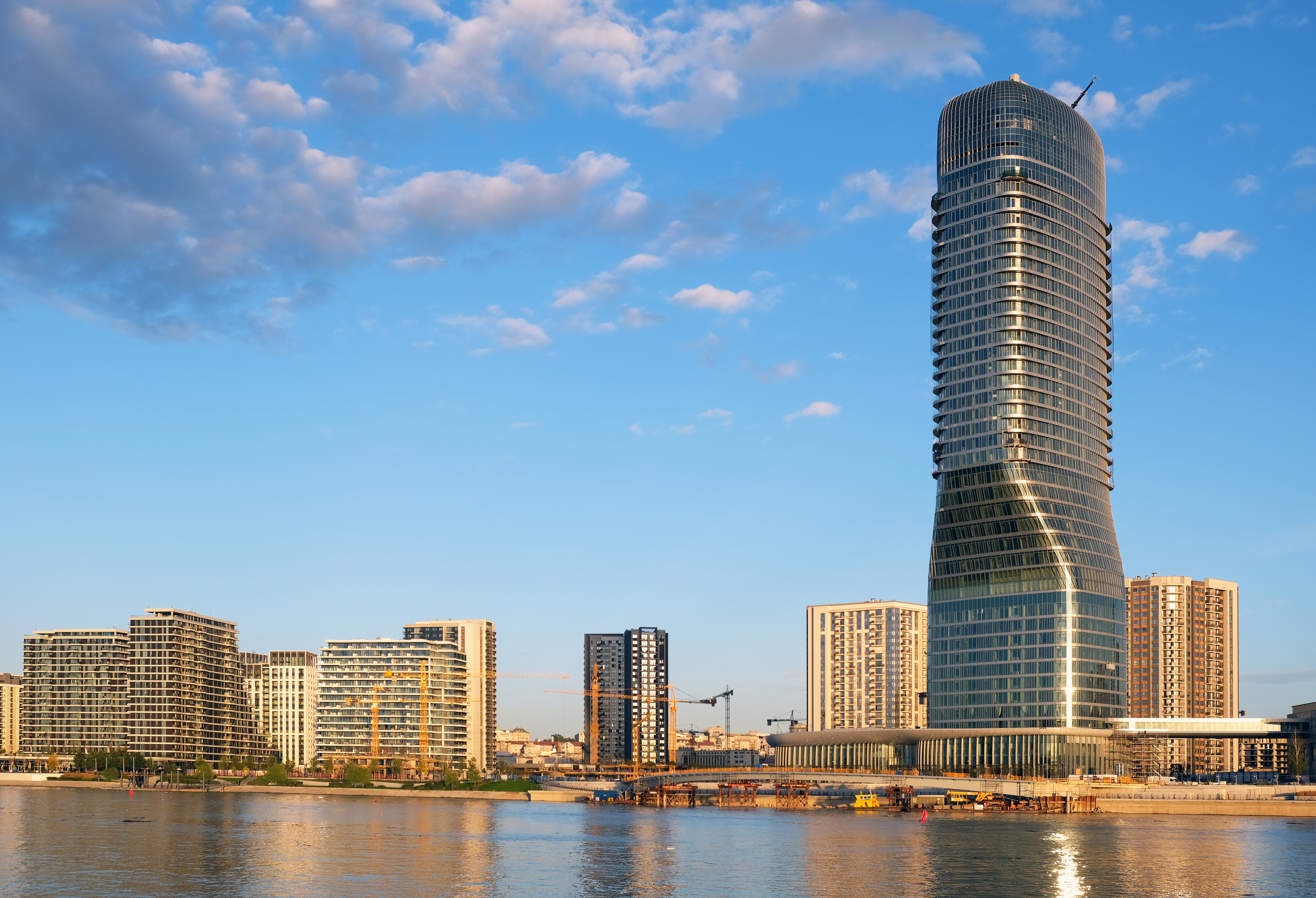

The tower was designed by the architectural firm Skidmore, Owings & Merrill (SOM). Its form rotates approximately 90 degrees as it rises, a feature intended to respond to surrounding contexts, improve structural performance by reducing wind loads, and whose silhouette has been described as referencing the nearby river confluence. At 168 m (551 ft) tall with 42 floors, it is the tallest building in Belgrade and Serbia. The taller Avala Tower is a telecommunications structure rather than a building.

== Construction ==
=== Design ===
Kula Belgrade was designed by the internationally recognized firm Skidmore, Owings and Merrill.

The building changes shape at the height of the 14th floor, where the building "twists".

The facade is composed of nearly 14,000 glass panels. Up to the ninth floor, the front also has a special "birds first" glass with lines visible only to birds, which helps them not to "collide" with the building. Another distinct feature of front glasses is that they are spectrally selective, i.e. they let in as much light as possible while reducing energy loss.

The skyscraper is connected to the Galerija shopping center by a pedestrian bridge, from where you can take an elevator directly to the observation deck. The building also has an underground garage on two levels with 305 parking spaces, while the second underground floor is planned for residential storerooms and accompanying technical rooms.

=== 13th floor ===
Kula Belgrade is the first building in Serbia with no 13th floor. Instead, the 12th floor will have a double level. The number 13 is not on the control panel of any of the 15 elevators in the building.

== Technical issues affecting use permit issuance ==
Kula Belgrade was ceremonially opened in autumn 2024. As of mid-2026, the building lacked an occupancy and use permit, according to records in Serbia's Central Registry of Unified Procedures (CEOP). The investor, had not submitted a formal request for the permit until around April 2026 in some reported cases, and the structure remained only partially occupied, with the hotel operating on lower floors and an observation deck opened later. Critics, described the tower as operating without formal verification of safety and readiness for use, with only mortgages registered on the land plot rather than full cadastral records of the completed structure.

An occupancy permit in Serbia confirms that a building complies with the approved design and regulations, that installations function properly, and that it is connected to required infrastructure, rendering it eligible for full use. Reports indicated delays and repeated submissions related to fire protection measures documentation, some involving BW Kula alone or jointly with Elektrodistribucija Srbije, as well as earlier issues with approvals for connection to communal infrastructure.

Two primary technical issues have been publicly cited as obstacles. First, the building's heating, ventilation, and air conditioning (HVAC) system was designed around a river-water cooling (and heating) system drawing from the Sava River, a feature highlighted in the original design by Skidmore, Owings & Merrill (SOM) to reduce energy needs. According to media reports, the system's effectiveness was compromised by the site's proximity to the Sava-Danube confluence, where high silt and mud content rendered the water unsuitable as a medium. The desilting subsystem was reportedly inadequately dimensioned, making the installed equipment largely unusable for cooling or heating and necessitating dismantling of significant portions, redesign, and replacement with air-based systems. Separate CEOP procedures related to intake and discharge of technical water from the Sava for the tower's thermo-technical installations faced repeated location condition requests and approvals over several years.

Second, fire protection systems were designed primarily according to the standards used in the United States. Serbian fire safety regulations were described by critics as stricter; obtaining final approvals from Ministry of Interior fire safety experts (part of the technical inspection process preceding an occupancy permit) proved difficult. This reluctance was reportedly heightened following the Novi Sad railway station canopy collapse tragedy. Multiple fire protection documentation requests were submitted, rejected, and later accepted in CEOP over preceding years.

The project operated under a special law adopted for Belgrade Waterfront allowing certain foreign standards, later reinforced by amendments to the Law on Planning and Construction and the Rulebook on the Implementation of the Unified Procedure. These changes, including provisions for special reports demonstrating compliance via foreign regulations and calculation methods when obtaining occupancy permits, were enacted or updated in the period leading up to 2026 and have been linked by observers to facilitating approval for such buildings. Additional reports noted that the hotel operator required reconstructions of certain levels to meet its standards prior to opening.

Investors did not publicly respond to media inquiries regarding the specific reasons for the permit delay or the status of technical remedies as of the latest reports. The building has continued limited operations and public use of facilities such as the observation deck amid the unresolved issues, while apartments remain unoccupied.

== St. Regis ==
In April 2016, it was announced that the Marriott hotel chain had chosen Kula Belgrade as the home of its luxury hotel franchise St. Regis. The Belgrade hotel is 6th in Europe and 61st in the world. In 2017, was announced that the building would also host "The Residences at The St. Regis Belgrade", the first branded St. Regis apartments in Europe.

Hotel St. Regis Belgrade occupies the first 11 floors of the building, offers 119 rooms and suites with a view of the city or the Sava River, and has a well-known St. Regis bar. The second floor has a swimming pool, spa, gym and meeting rooms.

== Observation deck ==
As the tallest building in Serbia, Kula Belgrade will have an observation deck at the top, on the 41st floor.

== Media facade ==
Since the beginning of 2022, important dates and events have been regularly marked on the media facade of Kula Belgrade. In January 2022, Orthodox New Year was celebrated with a three-and-a-half-minute light show and the colors of the Serbian flag. The projection of the message "Long live Serbia" marked the Sretenje holiday and Statehood Day of the Republic of Serbia in February 2022. In November 2022, the Kula Belgrade facade displayed an animation in honor of the Cyrillic alphabet and reformer of the Serbian language, Vuk Karadžić. In the same month, a message of support was sent to Serbian football players before the World Cup in Qatar 2022. In February 2023, several dozens of love messages were broadcast to mark Valentine's Day. In June 2023, the facade commemorated the success of Serbian tennis player Novak Djokovic, who won a record 23rd Grand Slam title. In June 2023, a special animation was shown in honor of Nikola Jokić, the Serbian basketball player who led his team to the first championship NBA title in history.

== Kula Plaza ==
The modernly designed plateau - Kula Plaza, located at the foot of the Kula Belgrade - will be the new place for city events and the most important cultural and artistic events, including concerts, festivals, various manifestations, performances and seasonal events. Kula Plaza was designed by SWA Group.
