= Trump Tower Belgrade =

- Alternative names: Belgrade Centrum

General information
- Type: Luxury hotel and condominiums
- Location: Savski Venac, Belgrade, Serbia
- Cost: US$500 million
- Owner: Affinity Partners; Trump Organization

Technical details
- Floor count: 30
- Grounds: 820,000 ft^{2} (76,000 m^{2})

Design and construction
- Architecture firm: Studio Genesis
- Developer: Eagle Hills Properties

Other information
- Number of rooms: 175 hotel rooms

Website
- trumpbelgrade.com

Trump Tower Belgrade, also known as Belgrade Centrum, was a proposed mixed-use luxury hotel and condominium apartment building on the site of the General Staff Building in Savski Venac, Belgrade, Serbia.

The real-estate developer Donald Trump, who later served as the 45th and 47th president of the United States, devised several plans to construct a property in Serbia. The Yugoslav Ministry of Defence Building, which was destroyed in the NATO bombing of Yugoslavia, received renewed attention from Richard Grenell, the special envoy to the Balkans in Trump's first presidency. According to Aleksandar Jovanović Ćuta, a Serbian environmental activist, a memorandum of understanding was signed in December 2022, offering the site to Kushner Realty and Atlantic Incubation Partners.

== Site ==
Trump Tower Belgrade was set to be constructed at the site of the General Staff Building, which was destroyed in the NATO bombing of Yugoslavia in 1999.

== Architecture ==
Trump Tower Belgrade was designed as a 175-room luxury hotel with commercial space and 1,500 residences. The tower is designed to have thirty floors and be 820,000 ft^{2} (76,000 m^{2}). It will include a museum and memorial in honor of the victims of the bombing of Yugoslavia, which will be managed by the government of Serbia and designed by Serbian architects. The complex will include a Trump International Hotel, the first in Europe. Renders of Trump Tower Belgrade were created by Studio Genesis.

== History ==
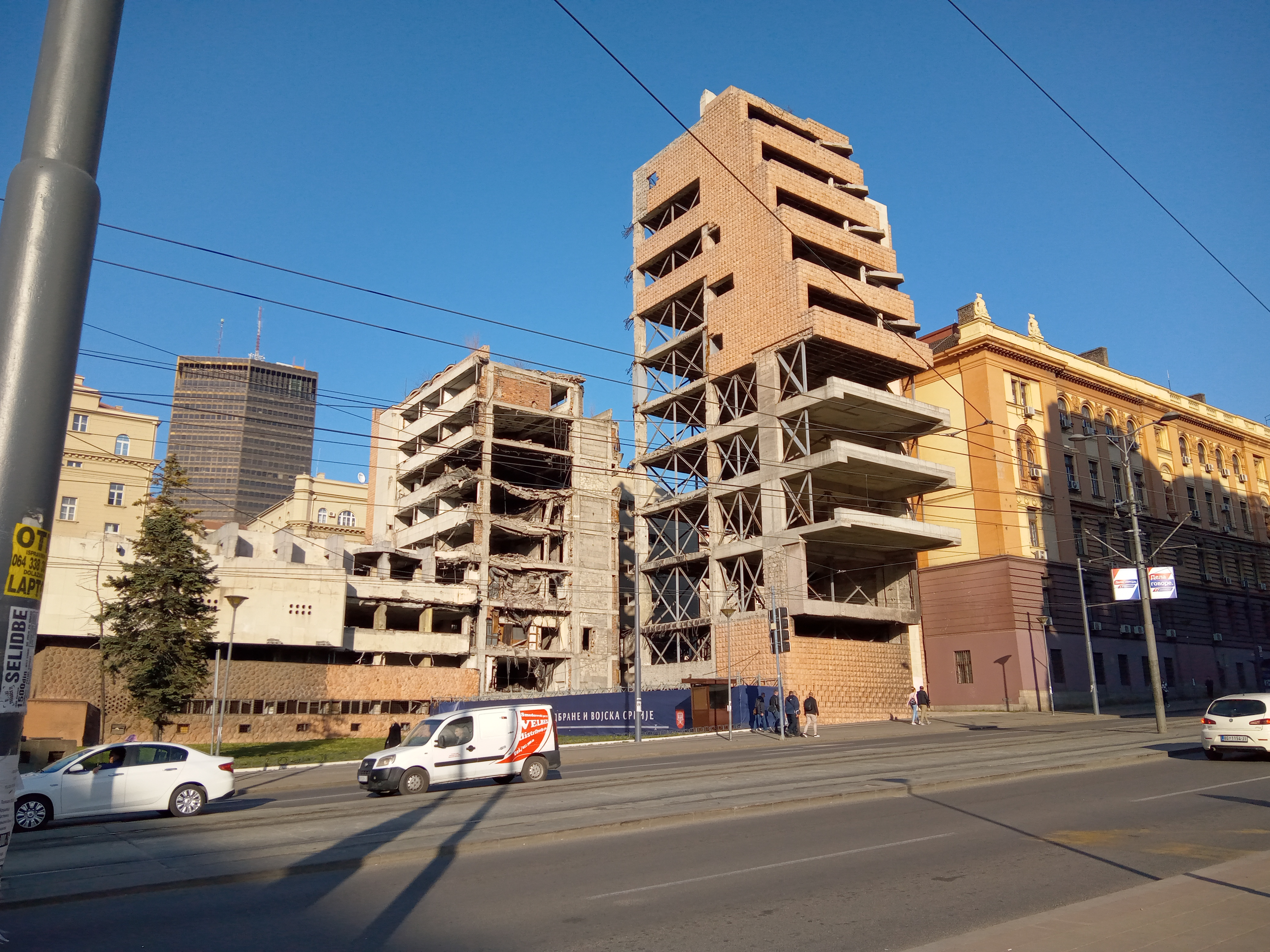
The General Staff Building in 2022

Several attempts at constructing a Serbian property branded with Donald Trump's name had been established prior to Trump Tower Belgrade, and multiple governments have attempted to restore the Yugoslav Ministry of Defence Building, according to Goran Vasić, the minister of construction, transport and infrastructure. In 2013, Trump told then-prime minister Ivica Dačić that he intended to construct a luxury hotel at the site of the Yugoslav Ministry of Defence Building and several Trump Organization associates had visited the site, though it did not yield in any discussions before Trump was elected president of the United States in 2016. During Trump's first presidency, Richard Grenell, the special envoy to the Balkans, advocated for having Serbia and the United States rebuild the Yugoslav Ministry of Defence Building, including after Serbian president Aleksandar Vučić met Trump at the White House in 2020. The New York Times wrote in April 2024 that Trump Tower Belgrade "benefited from relationships built in part during the Trump administration".

In March 2024, Aleksandar Jovanović Ćuta, a Serbian environmental activist, alleged that a memorandum of understanding had been signed in December 2022, offering the site of the Yugoslav Ministry of Defense Building to Kushner Realty and Atlantic Incubation Partners. Bloomberg News and The New York Times later disclosed that Jared Kushner was pursuing a real estate development in Belgrade; Kushner later confirmed the reports. The project would be funded by Affinity Partners, an investment company that had secured US$2 billion from the Public Investment Fund and hundreds of millions from the Emirates Investment Authority and the Qatar Investment Authority, though the money was largely uninvested by then. According to Kushner, Grenell encouraged him to seek the Belgrade deal. The outline of the agreement would give Affinity Partners a ninety-nine year lease at no cost. Kushner later told the Times that the parties of the deal had tentatively agreed to give the government of Serbia twenty-two percent of the profits from Trump Tower Belgrade. The agreement also includes the option of transferring the property to Affinity Partners after its construction. Trump Tower Belgrade was estimated to cost US$500 million.

The government of Serbia approved the contract with Kushner in May. The terms of the agreement gave Affinity Partners a set period of time to complete the project. By that month, Kushner had agreed to work with Asher Abehsera, who was designated to oversee development; he had also enlisted Grenell on the project. The site of Trump Tower Belgrade was leased from the government of Serbia. In January 2025, the Trump Organization announced that it would partner with Kushner on the complex. Kushner had also formed a partnership with Emirati property developer Mohamed Alabbar's company, Eagle Hills Properties. Construction of the tower faced a setback in May after Vasić, the acting director of the Republican Institute for the Protection of Cultural Monuments, was arrested for allegedly fabricating a document justifying removing the Yugoslav Ministry of Defence Building's cultural status. Vučić later stated that the project would continue, comparing criticism to the arguments raised against Belgrade Waterfront.

In December 2025, Kushner was reported to have withdrawn "hours after Serbian prosecutors charged four senior government officials there with corruption in connection with the half-billion-dollar project".

== Reception ==
Trump Tower Belgrade has garnered controversy over the involvement of Jared Kushner, the son-in-law of U.S. president Donald Trump. Robert Weissman, the president of Public Citizen, criticized the planned development and additional deals in Albania, stating that the properties appear to "involve the worst of every corrupt tendency of the Trump administration and Trump family." Kathleen Clark, a government ethics professor at the Washington University School of Law, postulated that the project would be a conflict of interest if Trump were to be elected president. Serbian representative Danijela Nestorović and other members of Together condemned Trump Tower Belgrade as a "mockery to the citizens of Serbia". Serbian president Aleksandar Vučić dismissed concerns at a rally, stating that he "died laughing" at the suggestion he was influencing Trump. Kushner and Richard Grenell have rejected claims of impropriety, stating that they are acting as private citizens.

The project also elicited ethics concerns from Democrats in the United States House of Representatives, who called for an investigation from Republicans on the House Foreign Affairs Subcommittee on Oversight and Accountability. Senator Ron Wyden and general Wesley Clark, who commanded NATO during the Kosovo War, have criticized the concept of a memorial to victims of the bombing of Yugoslavia constructed by an American company. Wyden and representative Jamie Raskin urged attorney general Merrick Garland to investigate the property in a letter sent in October 2024.

Protests have been held in Serbia against Trump Tower Belgrade. In March 2025, thousands of students protested at the site of the Yugoslav Ministry of Defence Building as part of broader anti-corruption protests.

== See also ==
- Sarona Hotel

== Works cited ==
- Bartenstein, Ben (15 March 2024). "Jared Kushner's Firm Eyes Billion-Dollar Property Deals in the Balkans". Bloomberg News.
- Bartenstein, Ben; Perlberg, Heather (16 January 2025). "Jared Kushner Bets on a Trump Hotel With Emirati Billionaire". Bloomberg News.
- Brown, Eliot; Salama, Vivian; Acosta, Deborah (4 October 2024). "Jared and Ivanka's Excellent Adventure". The Wall Street Journal.
- "Bušatlija: Zgradu Generalštaba ne poklanjati" [Bušatlija: Do not give away the General Staff building]. Danas (in Serbian). 15 March 2024.
- "Kakva je sudbina oštećenog Generalštaba u Kneza Miloša" [What is the fate of the damaged General Staff in Knez Miloš]. Politika (in Serbian). 14 March 2024.
- Kraja, Gresa (16 May 2025). "Trump Project Is Still on in Belgrade, Serbian President Says". Bloomberg News.
- Kuzmanovic, Jasmina (24 March 2025). "Students Protest at Belgrade Site Earmarked for Trump Hotel". Bloomberg News.
- Lipton, Eric; Swan, Jonathan; Haberman, Maggie (15 March 2024). "Kushner Developing Deals Overseas Even as His Father-in-Law Runs for President". The New York Times.
- Lipton, Eric; Haberman, Maggie; Swan, Jonathan (17 March 2024). "Kushner Deal in Serbia Follows Earlier Interest by Trump". The New York Times.
- Lipton, Eric (18 March 2024). "Serbian Leader Says Kushner Deal Is Not an Effort to Influence Trump". The New York Times.
- Lipton, Eric; Swan, Jonathan; Haberman, Maggie (9 April 2024). "As Kushner's Investment Firm Steps Out, the Potential Conflicts Are Growing". The New York Times.
- Lipton, Eric (16 May 2024). "Serbia Approves Contract With Jared Kushner for Hotel Complex". The New York Times.
- Lipton, Eric; Karaj, Vladimir (3 September 2024). "Trump Family's Land Deals in Albania Stir Up Lingering Resentments". The New York Times.
- Lipton, Eric (24 January 2025). "New Luxury Hotel in Serbia Will Be a Trump-Kushner Joint Project". The New York Times.
- Lipton, Eric (14 May 2025). "Trump-Kushner Hotel Project in Serbia Hits a Snag: Alleged Forgery". The New York Times.
- Mayes-Osterman, Cybele (25 March 2025). "Why a luxury compound funded by Trump son-in-law Jared Kushner is drawing protests". USA Today.
- Russell, Alec; Dunai, Marton (8 July 2024). "The European country playing off the US, Russia, China and Europe". Financial Times.
