= Church of Our Lady of Health, Split =

Church of Our Lady of Health
- Crkva Gospe od Zdravlja
- Church of Our Lady of Health
- Location: Split
- Country: Croatia
- Denomination: Roman Catholic
- Website: gospa-od-zdravlja.com

History
- Founded: 18th century
- Dedication: Our Lady of Health

Architecture
- Style: Modern

Specifications
- Materials: stone

The Church of Our Lady of Health is a modernistic Roman Catholic church in Split, Croatia. The present-day church was built and consecrated in 1937, standing on the site of two older 18th-century churches. It is located on the northern side of Gajo Bulat Square, east of the Croatian National Theatre building in Split.

== History ==
The history of the Franciscan presence in the Dobri district of Split dates back to the early 18th century. Following the Ottoman Empire defeat at the Siege of Vienna, a group of Franciscans left Rama in Bosnia in 1687 and moved to the Cetina region around Sinj at the encouragement of Venetian diplomats. A smaller group crossed the Klis area and settled in Split, initially staying in a house near the Church of St. Philip. They soon moved to a rented house in the Dobri district, as their original accommodation proved unsuitable.

In 1717, the Franciscans moved to a hospice near the Church of Our Lady of Pojišan, where they began constructing a monastery in 1718. However, following a dispute with the Split Cathedral Chapter over the construction, they abandoned the project and returned to Sinj. Only three friars remained in Dobri.

The Franciscan community was formally established in November 1723 as a hospice dedicated to the Annunciation of Mary. In 1729, the friars purchased two houses and a garden in the Dobri district, where they established a monastery and church the following year.

The first church was built between 1731 and 1732, following approval by the Venetian authorities in 1730. It was a modest, single-nave building located within the southeastern part of the monastery complex.

The monastery became a centre of Marian devotion after the district was reportedly spared from the plague outbreaks that struck Split in 1731, 1763 and 1784. The faithful attributed their protection to the Virgin Mary's intercession, establishing the veneration of Our Lady of Health. The monastery was renamed Our Lady of Health in 1757.

As the number of worshippers increased, a larger church was planned. An initial Baroque design by architect Luposignoli, dating from 1738, was never realized due to financial difficulties. Instead, a new church was constructed between 1759 and 1771 by Split-based builder Peter Manger, and dedicated by Archbishop Ivan Luka Garanjin on 21 November 1771.

A bell tower designed by architect and conservator Vicko Andrić was added in 1846.

During the early 20th century, growing devotion to Our Lady of Health and the increasing number of visitors made the existing church inadequate. Plans for its expansion or replacement were therefore considered. In 1930, a public architectural competition was organized, attracting seven proposals from architects based in Split, Zagreb, Sušak and Ljubljana. The winning design by engineer Silvio Sponza was ultimately rejected by the city's architectural authorities, leading the administration to seek another architect.

The foundation stone for the new church was blessed on November 21, 1931, by the Archbishop of Belgrade, Friar Rafael Rodić. The commission was given to Lavoslav Horvat, who prepared several designs between 1932 and 1935. His initial proposal envisaged a large, three-nave church, while later plans focused on expanding the existing building with a transept and an apse, partly preserving the older structure. These proposals were influenced by the financial difficulties of the period and the administration's desire to carry out construction in stages. Although a building permit was granted in September 1935, the expansion project was eventually abandoned in favour of demolishing the old church.

Horvat completed the final design in 1936, and the new Church of Our Lady of Health was constructed in 1937. It was consecrated in April 1937 by bishop Kvirin Klement Bonefačić.

The building serves as a monastic and a parish church. Rectangular in plan and supported by 18 columns, it is designed in a "hall church" style, in which the presbytery and three naves merge into a unified space.

The building represents an important example of modern religious architecture in Croatia. Its design reflected emerging architectural and liturgical ideas of the early 20th century, including spatial unity, simplicity of form, geometric clarity and a stronger emphasis on the relationship between the congregation and the liturgical space. In this respect, Horvat's work anticipated certain principles later formally emphasized by the Second Vatican Council.

== Christ the King mural ==
Ivo Dulčić: Christ the King (detail)

In 1958, the monastery's superior, fra Stanko Romac, commissioned Croatian painter Ivo Dulčić to create a large fresco for the church's northern wall. Although Dulčić initially proposed a depiction of the crucified Christ, Romac requested an image of the resurrected Christ rising from Croatian soil towards heaven.

Romac accepted the opinion of the esteemed Croatian painter Ljubo Babić, as confirmation of the artistic merit and validity of Dulčić's concept. The fresco also received approval from the Archbishop of Split-Makarska, Frane Franić.

Following the creation of the fresco sketch, certain detractors filed a complaint against Romac with the Congregation for the Doctrine of the Faith in Rome. Romac gathered favorable expert opinions from prominent art authorities and submitted them to Rome in response to the accusations. Once permission was granted, Dulčić began the painting process in April 1959 and completed the fresco titled "Christ the King" within three months. He was assisted by Đuro Pulitika and Josip Pavlović. In August 1959, during a visit to the monastery, the sculptor Ivan Meštrović remarked on the finished work: "It is good; it is beautiful!" This brought great relief to Dulčić, who understood how much Meštrović's endorsement meant to a divided community.

It became a central feature of the church's interior, complementing Lavoslav Horvat's architectural concept and adding a strong symbolic and spiritual dimension to the space. The work is regarded as an important achievement of Croatian religious art.

=== Description ===
The painter's mystical vision of Christ, which covers the entire northern wall above the main altar, measures 19.5 m × 9.5 m. Due to the presence of columns, the fresco cannot be viewed in its entirety from within the church. At its center stands a 6.5-meter-tall figure of Christ, rising from the Earth toward the heavens and clad in luminous white robes. His body is elongated, gaunt, and angular; his feet rest upon the Earth, while his massive arms reach out into the cosmos, in a posture that alludes to Christ on the Cross.

Surrounding Christ, the heavens are filled with the symbols of the Evangelists—John (the eagle), Luke (the ox), Matthew (the angel), and Mark (the winged lion)—as well as constellations that evoke the cosmic dimension of his kingship and the connection between the Earth and the heavenly kingdom.

To Christ's right, Dulčić depicts the brothers Cyril and Methodius, while to his left are St. Nikola Tavelić and St. Marko Križevčanin. St. Cyril holds a sheet bearing four Glagolitic letters.

The lower section of the composition depicts the Earth, featuring the white outlines of the coastline and the Croatian islands, populated by a multitude of people dressed in traditional folk costumes.
