= List of architectural projects in Belgrade =

There are many architectural projects under construction in Belgrade, Serbia. Since 2002, Belgrade has experienced a major construction boom. These are only some of the projects under construction in Belgrade:

== Under construction ==
Residential, office and retail projects:

=== New Belgrade ===
- Airport City Belgrade Under construction is one 14-story building with underground garages. Three new buildings including one Crowne Plaza hotel will start in 2020. Airport Garden residential buildings started in 2019.
- Wellport Belgrade Condominium project started in 2018. Estimated cost is 130 million Euros.
- Savada 3 New residential project in New Belgrade.
- Zep Terra Mixed use project by Zepter International. It will have 75k sqm of residential and 20k sqm of office space.
- Sakura Park Belgrade 228 apartments
- New Minel Project will have 120.000 sq meters of residential space. Investment estimated apx 100 million euros.
- Exing Home 65 Residential project of 24.000 sq meters.
- Park 11 Residential project by Energoprojekt.
- BLOK 23 Office Project of 50.000 sqm of premium office space in Block 23. After 8 years on hold, new owner finishing project.
- Tempo Tower business and residential project of 112,000 sq meters and 120 meters tall.

=== Old City Belgrade ===
- Belgrade Waterfront One of the biggest construction projects in Europe with an estimated investment of 3,5 billion Euros.
- Belgrade Skyline 200 million euro project. three towers with height of 132m,120m and 102m. Started in 2017.
- Dorcol Centar New residential project in Cara Dusana street.
- K-District New Office-RESIDENTIAL project in oldest part of the city. Next to city Zoo and Kalemegden fortress. Investment 90 million Euros.
- Kneza Milosa Residence 150 million Euros for new residential block in Kneza Milosa st, on the place of former US Embassy.
- New Dorcol Residential project of 100.000 sq meters in Lower Dorcol.

=== Other parts of the city ===
- Vila Banjica 280,000 sqm new gated residential project.
- Vozdova Kapija Residential Condo Project of 170 million euros. Project started in 2017.
- Zemunske Kapije Business and residential Project.
- East Side Complex 34.000 sqm residential project.
- Big Residences Total investment of 200 million euros under construction next to the Big shopping mall. Almost 1100 apartments will be constructed with 2200 parking spots. First phase of shopping area is opened in December 2019.
- IKEA Retail Center Additional Center next to the IKEA Istok. Will have 40.000 sq.m and will cost 70 million Euros.

=== Transportation, medical and infrastructural projects ===
- Belgrade Metro Two lines of total 42 km under construction. First line will be open in 2028, second in 2030. Total cost 9bn Euros.
- Belgrade bypass New Orlovaca, Batajnica interchange and connection to Bubanj Potok bypass with new interchange is under construction.
- Belgrade Centre railway station a mega-project that's scheduled to begin in September 2020, resulting in relocation of the main railway station and its railway tracks, which will consequently free up building space in Belgrade's inner centre. The entire project is worth an estimated 2 billion US dollars, and is scheduled to be completed within a decade. The Serbian company Energoproject will invest €200 million. Already invested over a billion dollars.
- Makis 2 Water production facility.
- Tirsova 2 New children hospital under constriction next to Tirsova 1 hospital. Construction scheduled for 2020. 75 million Euros.
- Interceptor Collector Sewer system collector under construction. Estimate cost 500 million $.
- Belgrade-Budapest High speed railroad Construction started in 2017.
- Vinca Waste Management and Bioenergy Plant Construction started in 2017. Project worth 300 million Euros and managed by Vinci SA.
- Heating System Pipe Connection between Nikola Tesla Power Plant and Heating Plant New BelgradeInvestment 190 million Euros from Power Construction Corporation of China. Starts in 2018.
- Cleaning Sewer Water Plant Veliko Selo with additional interceptor. Power Construction Corporation of China is contractor. Investment 385 million euros in Phase 1. Started in 2018.
- Belgrade Nikola Tesla Airport expansion by Vinci SA worth of 770 million Euros.
- Clinical Centre of Serbia Upgrade and expansion of main building. Started in late 2018. Project cost 110 million Euros.
- Belgrade Bus Station New BAS station is under construction in New Belgrade. Construction started in 2019. Old main station is demolished in Old town.
- New Belgrade Railway Station is under expanding reconstruction.

== Planned projects ==
- The Old Airport Congress center New Belgrade with 35-storey tower (144 m).
- Kopernikus Residential Towers in New Belgrade. Twin towers of 156 meters.
- Merin Tower Mixed use tower will be next to the NCR Campus in Block 42. It will have 28th floors and 100m height.
- Alta Tower 28 floor residential tower in New Belgrade.
- Delta Center Block 20 Twin towers of 100m height in Block 20 New Belgrade. One tower will be Hotel Intercontinental. Planned in 2021.
- Kempinski Hotel (reconstruction of Hotel Jugoslavija): in New Belgrade on the banks of the Danube. Expansion will add two twin 144 m tall 33-story skyscrapers. Casino Austria already invested about €60 million.
- Novak Tennis Center will be built in New Belgrade's in Blok 45. The complex will consist of 20–30 smaller tennis courts, and one main court with 5000 seats. The center will also have a tennis academy, a hotel, a hostel and other facilities. One of the owners will be ace Novak Djokovic, after whom it is named.
- IKEA Zapad Another IKEA store will be located close to the airport.
- Belgrade - Zrenjanin Expressway New 57 km new expressway worth of 300 million Euros.
- Ada Huja Bridge New bridge across river Danube. Construction starts in 2020 and worth it 120 million Euros.
- National Stadium will be constructed in Municipality of Surcin. It will have 65.000 seats and it will cost around 250 million Euros.

== Recently finished projects ==
- GTC X New office building in New Belgrade. Opened in 2022.
- NCR Corporation Campus will employ 5.000 employees and cost 90 million dollars. Opened in 2022.
- Chinese Cultural Center Belgrade Chinese Cultural Center will be one of the biggest in the world with a total of 32.000 sq meters. It will be located where the bombed Chinese Embassy in 1999 stood. When done, will be the largest Chinese Cultural Center in Europe. Total investment 45 million Euros. Opened in 2022.
- West 65 Project of 152.000 sq m and a 40-storey tower (155 m) in New Belgrade. Tallest residential skyscraper in Belgrade opened in 2022.
- Dedinje 2 New Cardic Surgery hospital next to Dedinje 1 Hospital. Opened in 2021.
- Batajnica Hospital is new 18.000 sqm hospital in Batajnica suburb. Construction done in just four months. Opened in 12/2020.
- Sirius Business Center Last phase finished in December 2020.
- GTC Green Heart Business complex of 87.000 square meters in New Belgrade. Opened in October 2020.
- MPC Navigator 2 Office building which will be next to the recently finished Navigator 1 in New Belgrade. Opened in September 2020.
- Ostružnica Bridge Second half of three lanes is opened in June 2020 as part of Belgrade beltway ring.
- Usce Tower 2 Twin tower next to Usce Tower in New Belgrade. Opened in June 2020.
- BEO Shopping Mall 130.000 sqm in Zvezdara municipality. Opened in June 2020.
- A Block 200,000 sq m office and residential spaces. Investment 200 million euros. Finished in 2019.
- Expressway Surcin-Obrenovac 17 km new expressway with new Obrenovac-Surčin Bridge (A2 motorway), as part of new expressway toward Montenegro. Opened in December 2019.
- Meita Baric Car part factory of investment of 200 million Euros. Opened in Barič in 2019.
- Ada Mall Project consists of 34,000 sg m and cost 100 million Euros. Opened in 2019.
- Central Garden: 200 million euros project started 2015. Project ended in 2019.
- Big Fashion Karaburma Big CEE invested 70 million Euros. Opened in 2017.
- Rajiceva Shopping Mall with Mama Shelter hotel. Opened in 2017, investment €80 million. Knez Mihajlova street.
- IKEA Istok One of the biggest IKEA stores in Europe. Second phase will include additional mall. Opened in 2017.
