= Millennium Team =

Serbian construction company

- Native name: Миленијум Тим
- Type: d.o.o.
- Industry: Construction
- Founded: 4 September 2003; 23 years ago
- Headquarters: Belgrade, Serbia
- Key people: Stojan Vujko (Director)
- Revenue: ▲€328.57 million (2025)
- Net income: ▲€21.82 million (2025)
- Total assets: ▲€454.22 million (2025)
- Total equity: ▲€85.71 million (2025)
- Owner: Ivan Bošnjak (50%); Stojan Vujko (50%)
- Number of employees: ▼783 (2025)
- Website: millenniumteam.rs

Millennium Team (Serbian: Миленијум Тим) is a Serbian construction company, with the headquarters in Belgrade, Serbia. It was founded in 2003.

== History ==
The company was founded on 4 September 2003. Founded and formally owned by Ivan Bošnjak and Stojan Vujko, Millennium Team has had many links with ruling party structures in Serbia since 2007. From 2007 to 2012, it was involved in pipeline construction projects run by the Serbian state-owned company Srbijagas. When the Serbian Progressive Party became the ruling party after 2012 elections, Millennium Team was involved in numerous construction projects which have political background and are closely related to the ruling party. Among them are construction projects around Belgrade Waterfront, silent takeover of once large construction company Mostogradnja, and takeover of NAVIP winery.

In January 2022, Millennium Team bought "Institut za vodoprivredu Jaroslav Černi" for 2.56 million euros. In March 2024, Millennium Team won the auction to take over indebted owner of Hotel Jugoslavija.
