= Sarona Hotel =

- Interactive map of the Sarona Hotel area

General information
- Type: Luxury hotel
- Location: Sarona, Tel Aviv, Israel
- Owner: Nitsba Group

Technical details
- Floor count: 47
- Grounds: 6 dunams

Design and construction
- Developer: Danya Cebus; Electra Construction

Other information
- Number of rooms: 880 hotel rooms

The Sarona Hotel is a proposed luxury hotel building in South Kirya, a section of Sarona, a neighborhood in Tel Aviv, Israel.

== Site ==
The Sarona Hotel is set to be constructed south of the Azrieli Sarona Tower, the tallest building in Israel, at the corner of Harbaa Street and Begin Road in South Kirya, a section of Sarona, a neighborhood in Tel Aviv, Israel. In June 2025, Sarona was hit by an Iranian airstrike in the Twelve-Day War.

== Architecture ==
The Sarona Hotel is designed as a 880-room—the most of any hotel in Israel—luxury hotel. It is set to be the tallest hotel in Israel upon its completion. Forty thousand square meters of land have been allocated for hotel space, with an additional two thousand square meters of commercial space, twenty thousand square meters of above-ground service space, and thirty-nine thousand square meters of underground service space. The underground areas were constructed by Danya Cebus, while the above-ground areas are being constructed by Electra Construction. Renderings of the hotel depict features restaurants, a spa, indoor and outdoor pools, a ballroom, and hundreds of rooms and suites on the first floor, with the second floor containing an exclusive lobby, lounge, suite, and a corner presidential suite. The hotel features a sky lobby and roof garden. It is planned to have forty-seven floors, though Eric Trump has urged Nitsba Group to add twelve floors; a request would require approval from the Civil Aviation Authority as the hotel is in the flight path of Ben Gurion Airport.

== History ==
The Israel Land Authority began promoting the site of the Sarona Hotel in 2009. In September 2011, Nitsba Group purchased the site for NIS 30.6 million, in addition to NIS 24.2 million in development costs, from the Israel Land Authority, beating only one competing bid amid a contentious land bidding environment. Three years later, the company received a building permit and began construction in 2015. After the Knesset approved a law giving municipalities the authority to approve forty percent of building rights for hotels, Nitsba submitted an unsuccessful request to add sixteen thousand square meters that would partially be used to construct over one hundred apartments. By 2020, much of the hotel's interior had been constructed; the hotel's construction was affected by the COVID-19 pandemic. In December 2020, the Israel Land Authority fined Nitsba NIS 14 million for not constructing the hotel within five years.

By October 2022, Nitsba was involved in a dispute with Electra Construction that had been referred to arbitration, delaying the project further. The Tel Aviv-Yafo Municipality continued to review Nitsba's plan for the hotel in compliance with Tel Aviv's master plan by that month. Construction continued until the 7 October attacks and the Gaza war, leading to a smaller workforce. A report from Airport City, Nitsba's parent company, indicated that "five basement floors and five foundation floors" had been cast, in addition to the areas from the ground floor to the thirty-sixth floor. Airport City invested NIS 47 million in the hotel in 2022 and an unspecified amount of NIS 44 million the following year. Airport City attributed work on Tel Aviv Light Rail to delays.

Prior to the Gaza war, the Trump Organization expressed interest in the Sarona Hotel. In 2025, after the second inauguration of U.S. president Donald Trump, the organization's executive vice president and Trump's son, Eric, began negotiations to partner with Nitsba Group, allowing the Trump Organization to manage the property. According to The New York Times, a potential partnership would pose "ethical and security perils" and complicate the elder Trump's foreign policy initiatives. Peter Bazeli, the managing director of Weitzman, a real estate advisory firm, told the Times that a Trump-branded property would risk becoming a military target.

== See also ==
- Trump Tower Belgrade

== Works cited ==
- גזית, אמיתי (16 December 2020). "נצבא שילמה 14 מיליון שקל קנס על עיכוב בהקמת מלון בשרונה - וזה לא מזיז לה" [Netsba paid a 14 million shekel fine for delaying the construction of a hotel in Sarona — and it doesn't bother them]. Calcalist (in Hebrew).
- Kamin, Debra; Eder, Steve; Protess, Ben (9 October 2024). "Trump Family Business Eyes Hotel Deals in Israel". The New York Times.
- Kamin, Debra; Protess, Ben; Eder, Steve (25 June 2025). "Trump's Name Could Adorn Tel Aviv Hotel, Becoming a Symbol or a Target". The New York Times.
- לוי, דותן (12 December 2022). "נצבא שוב תקועה: בניית מלון שרונה בת״א הופסקה" [Nitsba stuck again: Construction of the Sarona Hotel in Tel Aviv has been halted]. Calcalist (in Hebrew).
- ניסני, יובל (3 March 2025). "13 שנה אחרי שיצא לדרך: למה נתקעה בניית מלון הענק של תל אביב?" [13 years after it began: Why has construction of Tel Aviv's giant hotel stalled?]. Globes (in Hebrew).
