= Americana Group =

Emirati food company

Americana Restaurants International PLC
- Type: Public
- Traded as: ADX: AMR; Tadawul: 6015
- Industry: Restaurant chain franchising packaged goods manufacturing
- Founded: 1964; 62 years ago
- Headquarters: Sharjah, United Arab Emirates
- Key people: Mohamed Alabbar (chairman); Kesri Kapur (CEO)
- Products: QSR, casual & fine dining, frozen and canned food, dairy products, snacks, bottled water
- Parent: Public Investment Fund (50 percent); Adeptio AD Investments
- Website: www.americanarestaurants.com

Americana Restaurants International PLC is a food company headquartered in Sharjah City. It operates food products throughout the Middle East and North Africa region, Americana Group is the largest integrated food company in Middle East. Its shares are listed on the Abu Dhabi Securities Exchange and the Saudi Exchange.

== History ==
In 1970, Americana first opened Wimpy in Kuwait. During the 1970s, Americana Meat was introduced in the market which included chicken nuggets, hamburgers, chicken fillets and more.

In October 2016 a subsidiary of Adeptio bought a 67 per cent stake in Americana from the Kuwaiti Al-Kharafi family for about $2.35 billion. In the same year the Public Investment Fund of Saudi Arabia bought 50 per cent of Adeptio from Mohamed Alabbar. Adeptio owned 93.4 per cent of Americana when the company voluntarily delisted its shares from the Kuwait Stock Exchange on 23 April 2018.

On 12 December 2022 shares of Americana Restaurants International began trading on the Abu Dhabi Securities Exchange and the Saudi Exchange. It was the first company to be listed in both Saudi Arabia and the United Arab Emirates. The Public Investment Fund and Alabbar sold a 30 per cent stake in the initial public offering, which raised $1.8 billion.

Americana Group's main lines of business are operating food and beverage outlets, and manufacturing of food products. It has a network of over 2,465 outlets. The group’s network encompasses several brands in the quick service, casual dining and fine dining categories, some of which are KFC, Pizza Hut, Hardee's, T.G.I. Friday's, Costa Coffee, Baskin Robbins, Krispy Kreme, Olive Garden, Red Lobster, and LongHorn Steakhouse.

In 2025, Americana announced plans to diversify away from US brands after full year net profits at the company fell by nearly 40 per cent to $159mn in 2024, due to local boycotts of brands like KFC and Krispy Kreme over the US support for Israel during Gaza war.

== Operating countries ==
Americana currently has 23 restaurant chains in 13 countries.

Africa

- Egypt
- Morocco

Asia

- Bahrain
- Iraq
- Jordan
- Kazakhstan
- Kuwait
- Lebanon
- Oman
- Qatar
- Saudi Arabia
- UAE
- Iran (plan to open)
- (Syrian opposition) Syria (plan to open)
