= Bed and breakfast =

Small lodging establishment

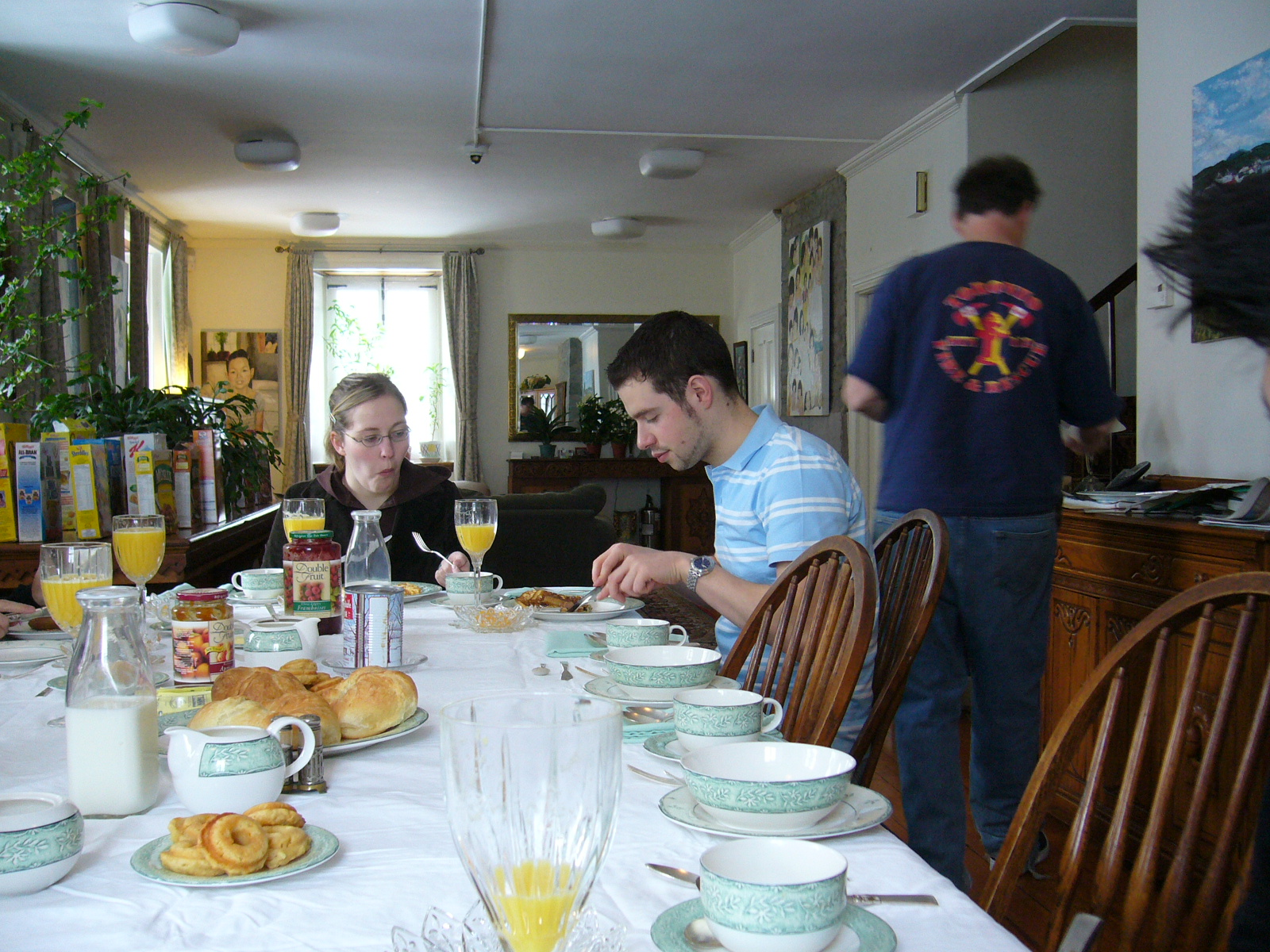
Breakfast at a B&B in Quebec City, Canada

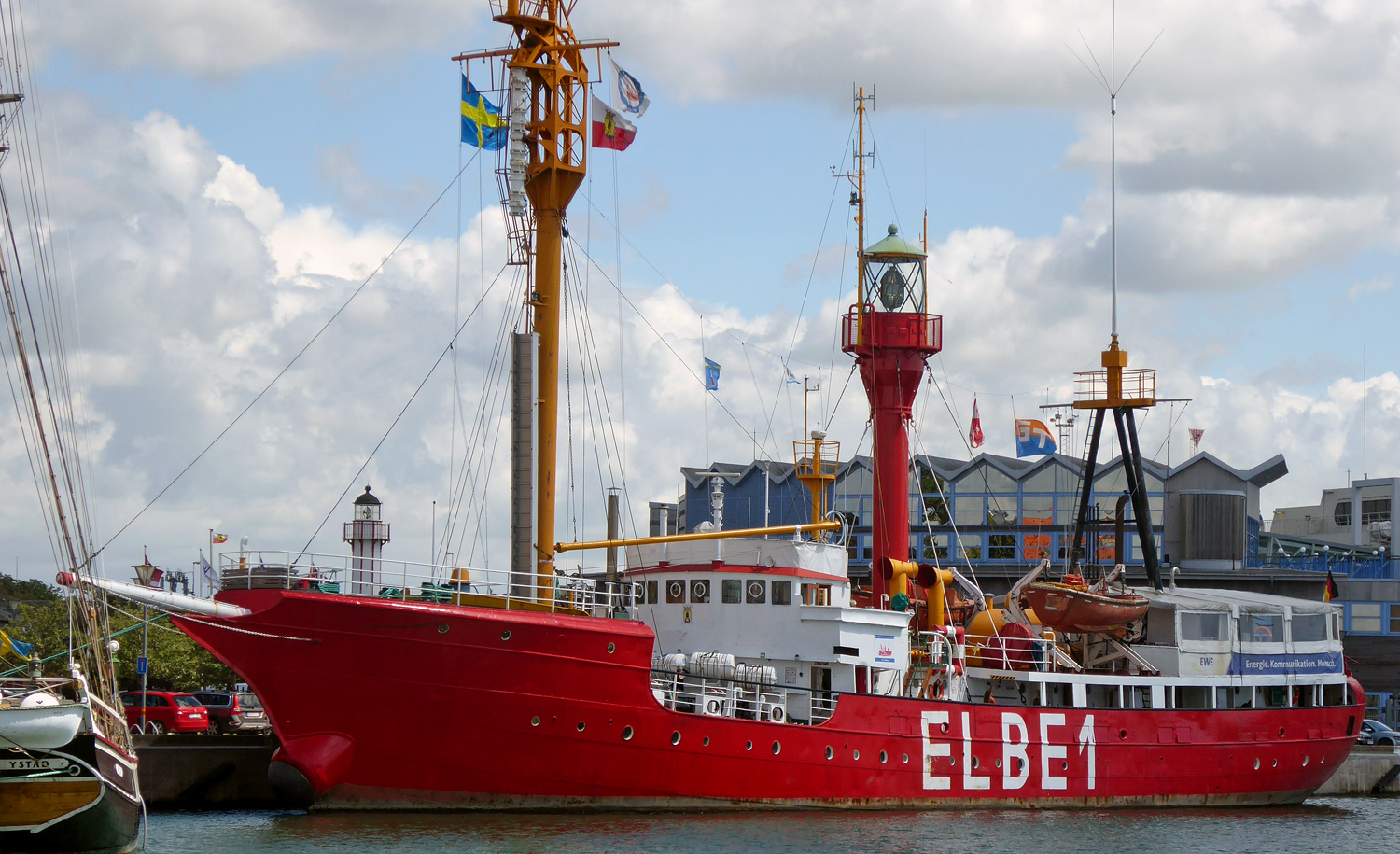
The ship Bürgermeister O´Swald II is now a B&B in the port of Cuxhaven.

A bed and breakfast (typically shortened to B&B or BnB) is a small lodging establishment that offers overnight accommodation and breakfast. A B&B generally has the hosts living in the same house.

Bed and breakfast is also used to describe the level of catering included in a hotel's room prices, as opposed to room-only, half-board, or full-board.

== International differences ==
=== Australia ===
There are approximately 7,000 B&Bs in Australia.

The B&B industry in Australia generates about $132 million in annual revenue.

=== China ===
In China, immigrants have remodeled traditional structures in quiet picturesque rural areas and opened a few rustic boutique hotels with minimum amenities. Most patrons are foreign tourists but they are growing in popularity among Chinese domestic tourists.

=== France ===
Bed and Breakfast accommodation in France is called a Chambre d'hôtes.

=== India ===
In the lead-up to the 2010 Commonwealth Games in Delhi, the government of India promoted the concept of bed & breakfast as an effort to increase tourism, especially keeping in view the demand for hotels. All B&Bs must be approved by the Ministry of Tourism, which will then categorize them as Gold or Silver based on a list of predefined criteria.

=== Ireland ===
In Ireland, B&Bs can be townhouses, farmhouses, or country houses. There are about 3,000 B&Bs spread throughout the country, 750 of which are certified for meeting quality standards by Fáilte Ireland.

=== Israel ===
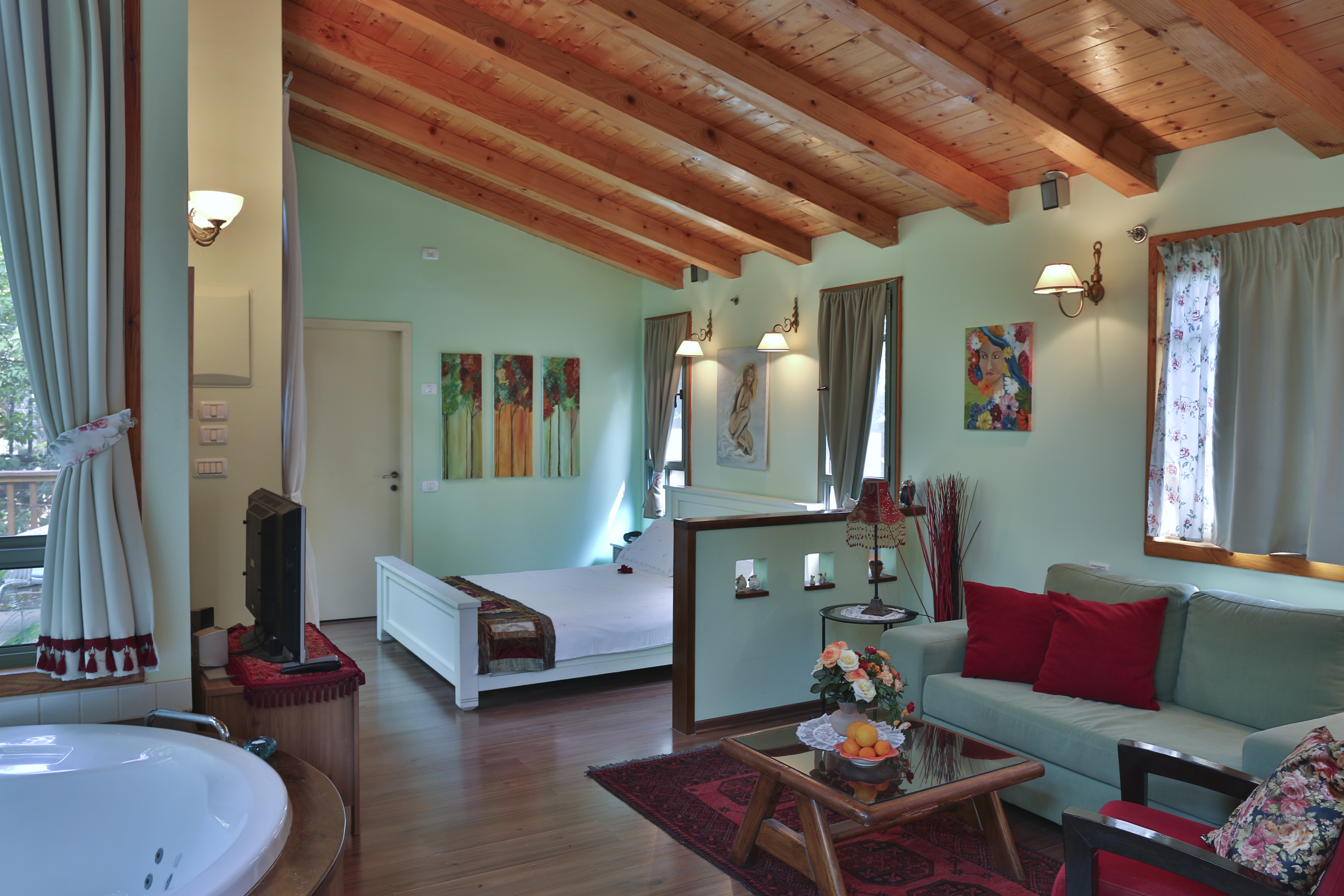
Rural tourism in Israel includes accommodations ranging from basic converted buildings to luxurious log cabins (Zimmers) equipped with modern amenities.

The Israeli B&B is known as a zimmer (German for 'room'). All over the country, but especially in northern Israel (Galilee and Upper Galilee), the zimmer has developed into an extensive industry. This industry began to develop in the 1990s, when agriculture became less profitable, and many families with farms in moshavim, kibbutzim, farms, and even in cities decided to try their luck in the business of hospitality. In the last decade, bed and breakfasts have also emerged in southern Israel's Negev region.

=== Italy ===
In Italy, regional law regulates B&Bs. There is a national law "Legge 29 marzo 2001, n. 135" but each region maintains a specific regulation. Each region can adopt different regulations but they must observe the national law on Tourism (Law N° 135 /2001).

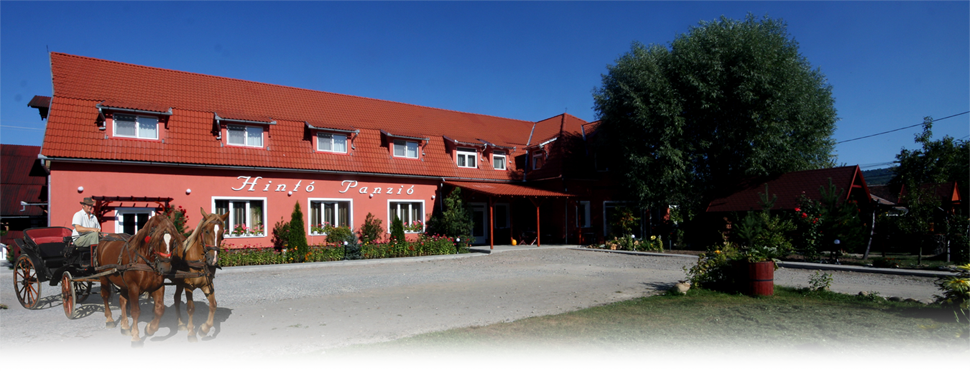
Carriage B&B Hinto Panzio in Transylvania, Odorheiu Secuiesc, Romania

=== Japan ===
The Japanese equivalent of this sort of hospitality business is the minshuku, which offers dinner as well as bed & breakfast in the tradition of the ryokan.

=== United Kingdom ===
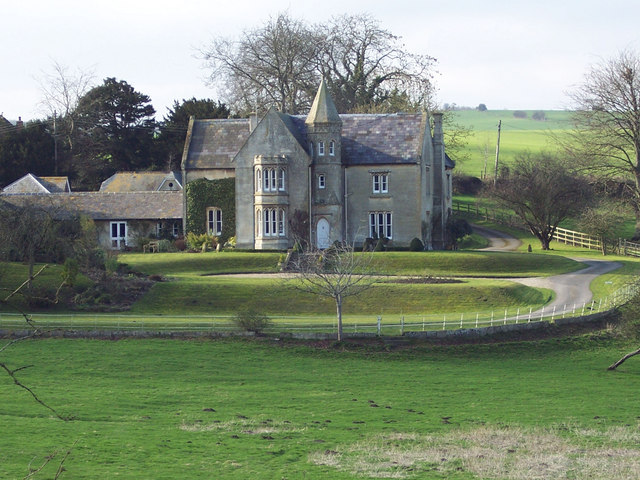
Little Langford Farmhouse, Salisbury, Wiltshire

There are different styles of B&Bs and they are often found in seaside towns, the countryside and city centres.

B&Bs are graded by VisitBritain and the AA on a star system. 3-, 4- and 5-star establishments have a higher standard. A majority of B&Bs in the UK have en suite facilities.

=== United States ===
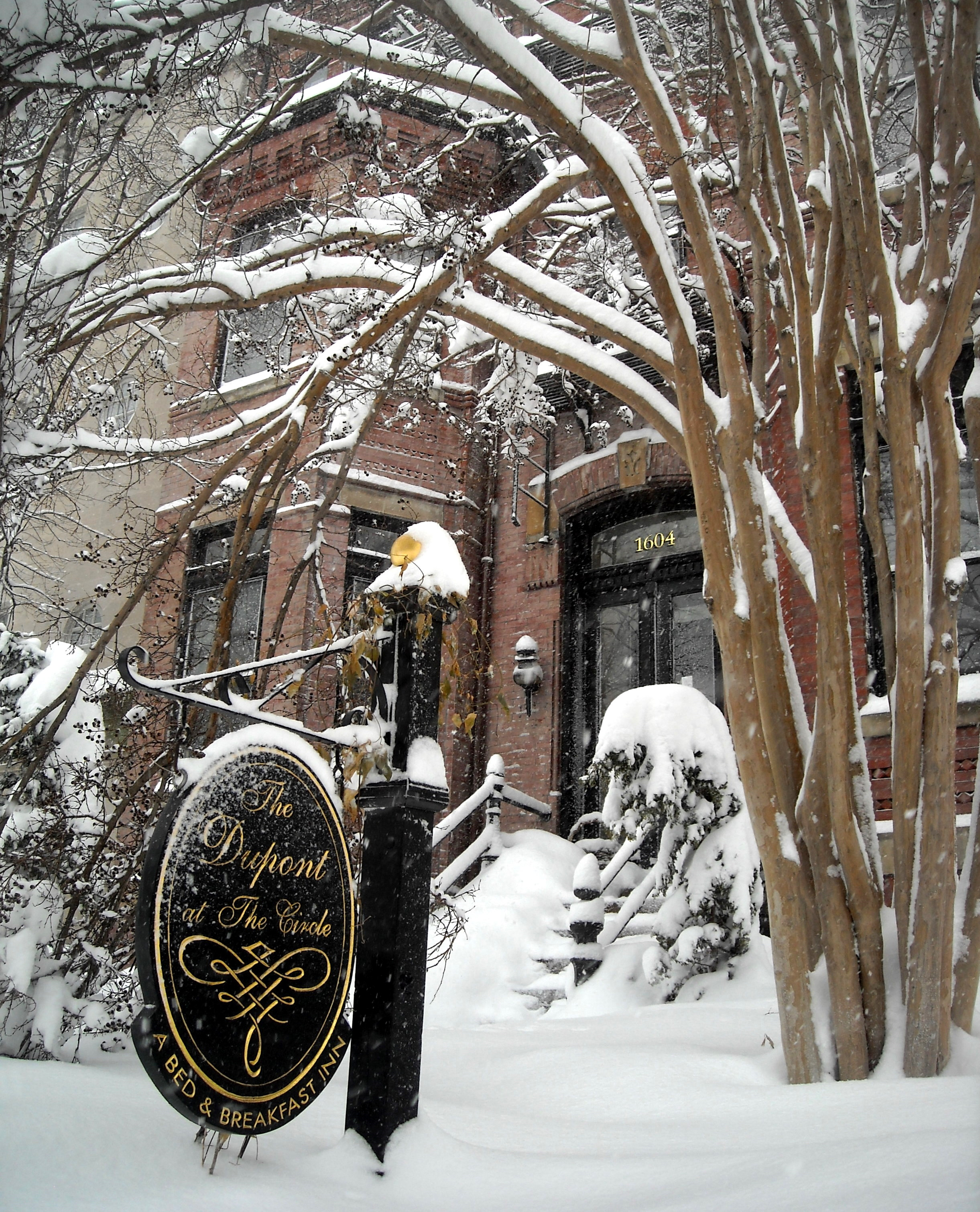
Front yard of a B&B in the Dupont Circle neighborhood of Washington, D.C.

There are approximately 17,000 B&Bs in the United States. Bed and breakfasts are often private family homes and typically have between four and eleven rooms, with six being the average.

== See also ==
- Airbnb
- Inn
- Hostel
- Hotel garni
