= Hotel Jugoslavija =

Hotel in Belgrade, Serbia

- Хотел Југославија
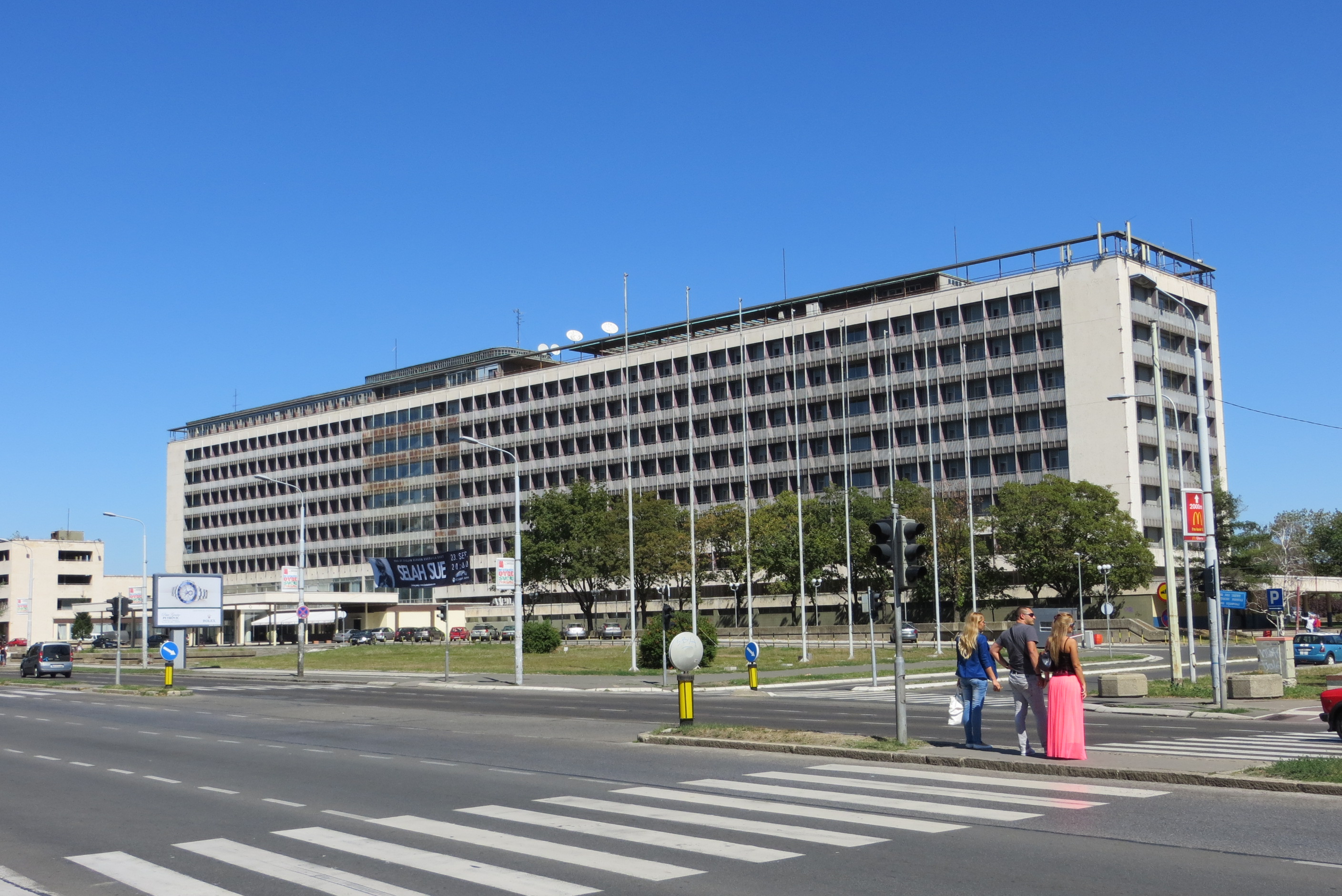
- The hotel as of 2013

- Location within Belgrade
- Hotel chain: None

General information
- Location: Bulevar Nikole Tesle 3, Belgrade, Serbia
- Coordinates: 44.8297°N 20.4200°E
- Opened: 31 July 1969
- Demolished: January 2025
- Owner: Millennium Team d.o.o.

Technical details
- Floor count: 8
- Floor area: 50,000 m2
- Lifts/elevators: 8

Design and construction
- Architect: Lavoslav Horvat

Other information
- Number of rooms: 258

Hotel Jugoslavija (Serbian Cyrillic: Хотел Југославија) in Belgrade was one of the oldest luxurious Serbian hotels. It was located in the Zemun municipality. The hotel was opened in 1969 as "one of the most comfortable and most luxurious" hotels in Yugoslavia, and "among top 5 largest and most beautiful hotels in Europe." It closed in 2006, but one half of the hotel was reopened in 2013 as a three-star hotel garni, which operated until 2024, when the entire structure was closed. It was demolished in January 2025.

== History ==
=== Zemun railway station ===
The Zemun railway station was located next to where the modern hotel is. It was built in 1883 during the rule of Austria-Hungary, when the railway connecting Zemun to Novi Sad was completed. In 1884, the railway was extended across the Sava into the Kingdom of Serbia as the first railway in the country. The first train from Serbia, carrying passengers including King Milan, Queen Natalija, and Crown Prince Alexander, stopped at this station on its way to Vienna.

The station was operational until 1970. To commemorate it, architect Milun Stambolić designed a memorial complex consisting of five pillars, which used to hold the station's overhang, and several meters of railroad tracks. The complex is located on the plateau next to the hotel, on a small elevation above the promenade along the Danube. The memorial complex was installed in the 1980s.

=== Hotel ===
According to the original concept, the hotel was to be named "Belgrade". Famous architects Mladen Kauzlarić, Lavoslav Horvat and Kazimir Ostrogović, followers of the Zagreb school of modernism won the first prize at the original tender in 1947. The hotel was built according to the modified project of the architect Lavoslav Horvat. Distinguished creators and builders, architects Milorad Pantović, Vladeta Maksimović, Miroslav Janković and academic Ivan Antić took part in designing of the hotel and the interior. The design was described as both "simple and monumental".

Construction plans were put on hold after the Tito–Stalin split in 1948, and during the ensuing Informbiro period. During the 1st Summit of the Non-Aligned Movement in Belgrade in 1961, Ethiopian emperor Haile Selassie noted to Yugoslav president Josip Broz Tito that Belgrade lacks a representative hotel, and unofficially suggested the name Jugoslavija. After the summit ended, old project of the "hotel-city" on the Danube's bank was revitalized.

Planned and built for two decades, it was nicknamed "Belgrade Babylon". The hotel was ceremonially opened on 31 July 1969 by Rudi Kolak, president of the Yugoslav Chamber of Commerce. "Jugoslavija" became a symbol of luxurious hotel, with pricey, artistic paintings, and gold and silver plated cutlery and plates. Hotel had the biggest chandelier in the world until 2010, designed and made by Swarovski in 1969. It has 40.000 crystals, 5.000 bulbs and weight of 14 tonnes. Rectangularly shaped chandelier measures 30 by 9 metres (98 ft × 30 ft).

It was used as an accommodation for celebrities and high officials visiting Belgrade, as president Tito included the hotel in his official protocol. Some of the famous people who stayed in the Hotel Jugoslavija include Queen Elizabeth II, Richard Nixon, Jimmy Carter, U Thant, Willy Brandt, Neil Armstrong, Michael Collins, Buzz Aldrin, Belgian and Dutch royals, Luis Echeverría, athletes, artists, Maharishi Mahesh Yogi, Tina Turner and others.

The Apollo 11 astronauts visited in October 1969. In 1972, queen of the Netherlands Juliana and her consort Bernhard organized a reception in honor of president Tito. The queen described the hotel as impressive and enchanting. That same year, Queen Elizabeth II organized a reception for diplomatic representatives of the Commonwealth nations in Yugoslavia. Another major event was the 1975 conference of 40 workers' parties from 29 European countries. After staying at the hotel, founder of the Elle magazine Hélène Gordon-Lazareff, stated: "Even Paris has no hotel beautiful like this one".

During the 1999 NATO bombings of Yugoslavia, the hotel was hit and damaged during the night of 7/8 May 1999. Two attacks, two missiles in the first and one more in the second, left the building unusable. The west wing was damaged, while the annex and the north wing were thoroughly demolished. Reconstruction began in October 1999. Only parts were fully renovated, while other parts were only fixed enough to stop further collapse. The hotel was reopened on 31 December 1999, with the New Year's Eve party.

Grand Casino company purchased the first casino license in Serbia for €18 million from the State Lottery, and, claiming a total investment of €60 million, opened Grand Casino Beograd in the section of the hotel on 30 June 2007. Part of the hotel was owned by Arkan, and had been used as a barracks for his paramilitary forces.

=== Quay ===
Former logo of the hotel

In the early 1970s, architect Branislav Jovin designed the plateau and the quay in front of the hotel. Generally considered beautiful and elegant, the project allows the cascade descent from the hotel to the Danube's bank. Early 1990s saw the expansion of the splavovi (singular, splav), barge-clubs on the rivers. They originated along the banks of the Sava and expanded in the nearby Ušće neighborhood. After 1996, they spread along the quay in front of the hotel.

The location was favorable as it was one of the rare point at the time, where there was enough parking space and the quay was arranged and concreted, while many other parts of the banks were the barges were located were still muddy and inaccessible. In the 1996–2000 period, the splavovi were swiftly anchored in front of the hotel and in such numbers, that they became so close to each other that guests from one splav were able to talk to the guests from another one. In this period, barges at Hotel Jugoslavija became one of the most popular hangouts, as the barges became the central point of Belgrade's nightlife, but were also connected with criminals and numerous incidents. The entire section of the bank in front of the hotel has since then been colloquially known as "Chez Juga" (Kod Juge), after the shortened name of the hotel.

Majority of the barges placed in the last part of the 1990s are still operational, even under the same names, but are being replaced with much larger and modernized versions, unlike the other locations where splavovi appeared and disappeared, or changed names.

The first planned bicycle path in Belgrade was built from Hotel Jugoslavija to Ušće. Designed by Mirko Radovanac, it was finished in 1979.

=== Closing ===
In 2006 the hotel was privatized and closed. It was purchased by the "Alpe Adrija hoteli" (renamed "Danube Riverside" in 2013) for €31.3 million. Croatian businessman from Split who was behind the company, later that year sold 25% of the ownership to the international investment fund "QS Investments" and "Danube Riverside" continued as its local offshoot, in charge with obtaining all the permits. They wanted to build two 147 m (482 ft) tall towers and a shopping mall. One tower should be residential and the other one was to be a combination of business area and apartments. However, the permits were denied because of the ownership of the land itself, which remained owned by the state. Though they are not obliged to do so, the investors announced international design competition for the towers, but dropped the idea later. Architect Goran Vojvodić was in charge of the project which was estimated to €130-150 million.

In 2008 the "Alpe Adrija hoteli" obtained the location permit, while the "QS Investments" obtained additional 25% of the ownership. They applied to the city government for the construction permit in 2009, but were rejected in 2010 due to the incomplete documentation. The investor filed a complaint, the court returned the procedure back to the city, but the investor asked for the procedure to be halted until the documentation is ready, so the process was archived. By the end of 2010, city administration headed by the mayor Dragan Đilas adopted a new Belgrade Highrise Study, which was forbidding construction of the objects higher than 100 m (330 ft) on the hotel's location, while the "QS Investments" becomes the sole owner of the hotel.

In 2011, the city approved the drafting of detailed regulatory plans for this location and in 2012 the investor announced the opening of the hotel in 2015. In 2013 parts of the hotel were opened for the first time after 7 years, but not for guests. Several floors were leased as business offices. The summer restaurant patio was also opened. Also in 2013, 132 rooms were adapted and the hotel was partially reopened as hotel garni.

=== Final years and demolition ===
In February 2014, the "Danube Riverside" announced new plans regarding "Jugoslavija". The hotel was to be renovated as a five-star Kempinski by 2019. The complex was to be expanded with two 33-story towers, with a total floor area of 190,000 m^{2} (2,000,000 sq ft) on 5 ha (12 acres). New city administration, headed by Siniša Mali abolished the Highrise Study allowing tall buildings all over the city. In 2015 the detailed regulatory plan which encompassed this project was adopted, despite fierce opposition from experts and the public to the construction of skyscrapers on this location. The projected value of the works was €300 million. The detailed regulatory plan adopted by the city in 2015 confirmed this design, with a shopping mall and two 140 m (460 ft) tall towers.

By August 2019, nothing had been done regarding the project. The head of the "Hotel Jugoslavija Project", Iva Petrović, said they would have "more information" in October 2019. In February 2023, the architectural company Bureau Cube Partners was charged with drafting the plan of detailed regulation for the entire Block 11 (where "Jugoslavija" is located) and part of Block 10, which would replace the 2015 plan. In September 2023, it was announced that the works "may begin" in 2024, but this time on a larger scale, with 240,000 m^{2} (2,600,000 sq ft). They will include the 155 m (509 ft) tall tower (or two towers) with 500 apartments and commercial areas. The project was described as "inevitable and urgent" in the elaborate for the development of the location, this time funded by the Millenium Team company, notorious for its connections with the governing structures.

In March 2024, it was announced that the hotel would become part of the Marriott International group and would operate under The Ritz-Carlton branch of hotels. A new plan was done by the Dutch architectural company UNStudio, featuring two towers (one residential, the other business) with heights of 155 m (509 ft). More detailed renders for that plan were released in April 2024.

In September 2024, it was reported that the historic 1969 structure would be demolished as part of the redevelopment plans.

The structure was demolished in January 2025.

== Gallery ==
Project Riverside - West birds-eye view

Project Riverside - East birds-eye view

Project Riverside - East façade
