= Belgrade Waterfront =

Urban development project in Belgrade, Serbia

- Београд на води Beograd na vodi
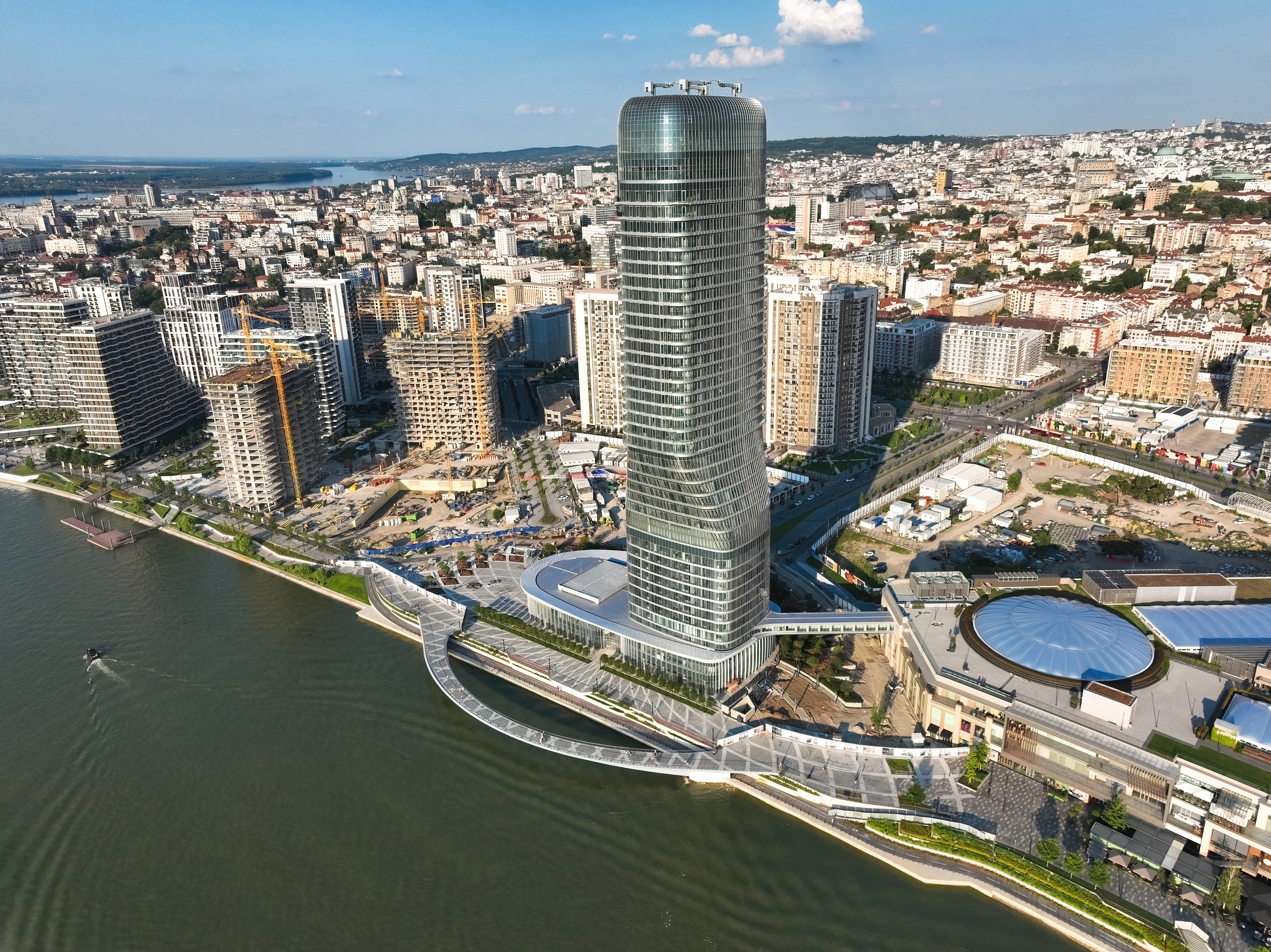
- Belgrade Waterfront in 2024

- Location within Belgrade

General information
- Location: Belgrade, Serbia
- Coordinates: 44°48′33.2″N 20°26′56.8″E
- Construction started: 2014

Website
- www.belgradewaterfront.com/en/

Belgrade Waterfront (Serbian: Београд на води / Beograd na vodi, lit. 'Belgrade on the Water'), is an urban renewal development project headed by the Government of Serbia aimed at changing Belgrade's cityscape and economy by revitalizing the Sava amphitheater, between the Belgrade Fair and Branko's bridge, including the Savamala neighbourhood.

It was started in 2014 with the reconstruction of the Belgrade Cooperative building, which was finished in June of the same year. It is the second largest mixed use complex under construction in Europe, just after Minsk Mir, worth $3.5 billion. Belgrade Waterfront complex will include 10,000 residential units, bilingual elementary school and kindergartens, luxury hotels including St. Regis, the largest shopping mall in southeast Europe Galerija, and public buildings. In total, about 1.8 million square meters will be built.

The project was initiated in 2014 between the Government of Serbia and Eagle Hills Properties, a leading Abu Dhabi–based private investment and development company focused on creating new city hubs in high-growth international markets. Around $3.5 billion will be invested by the Serbian government and their UAE partners. The project's central point is Kula Belgrade, a new city landmark. Standing at 168 metres (551 ft), this building is designed by the architectural firm, Skidmore, Owings & Merrill.

== Location ==
Belgrade Waterfront complex is located on the right bank of river Sava, in Sava Amphitheater occupying the central city area from Branko's Bridge to the Belgrade Fair. In the 20th century, with the construction of New Belgrade and the expansion of Belgrade to the south, 100 hectares of this plain area on the right bank of the Sava river became neglected. The elongated plain terrain is bordered by hills, which gives it the appearance of a theater. Hence the name – Sava Amphitheater.

Considerations about the arrangement of this part of Belgrade began almost 100 years ago. For the first time, in 1923, the Russian architect Đorđe Pavlovič Kovaljevski, in the General Plan for the arrangement and expansion of Belgrade, foresaw the space between the Sava river and the railway tracks as a place for new apartment blocks. That was the first time that the name Sava Amphitheater was used to describe the area. Later, at the architectural competition for the Terazije plateau reconstruction in 1929, Nikola Dobrović indicated the direction of Terazije - the Sava Amphitheater route. In the next 80 years, many architects and urban plans foresaw the Sava amphitheater's arrangement and the city's access to the river.

== Belgrade Waterfront project ==
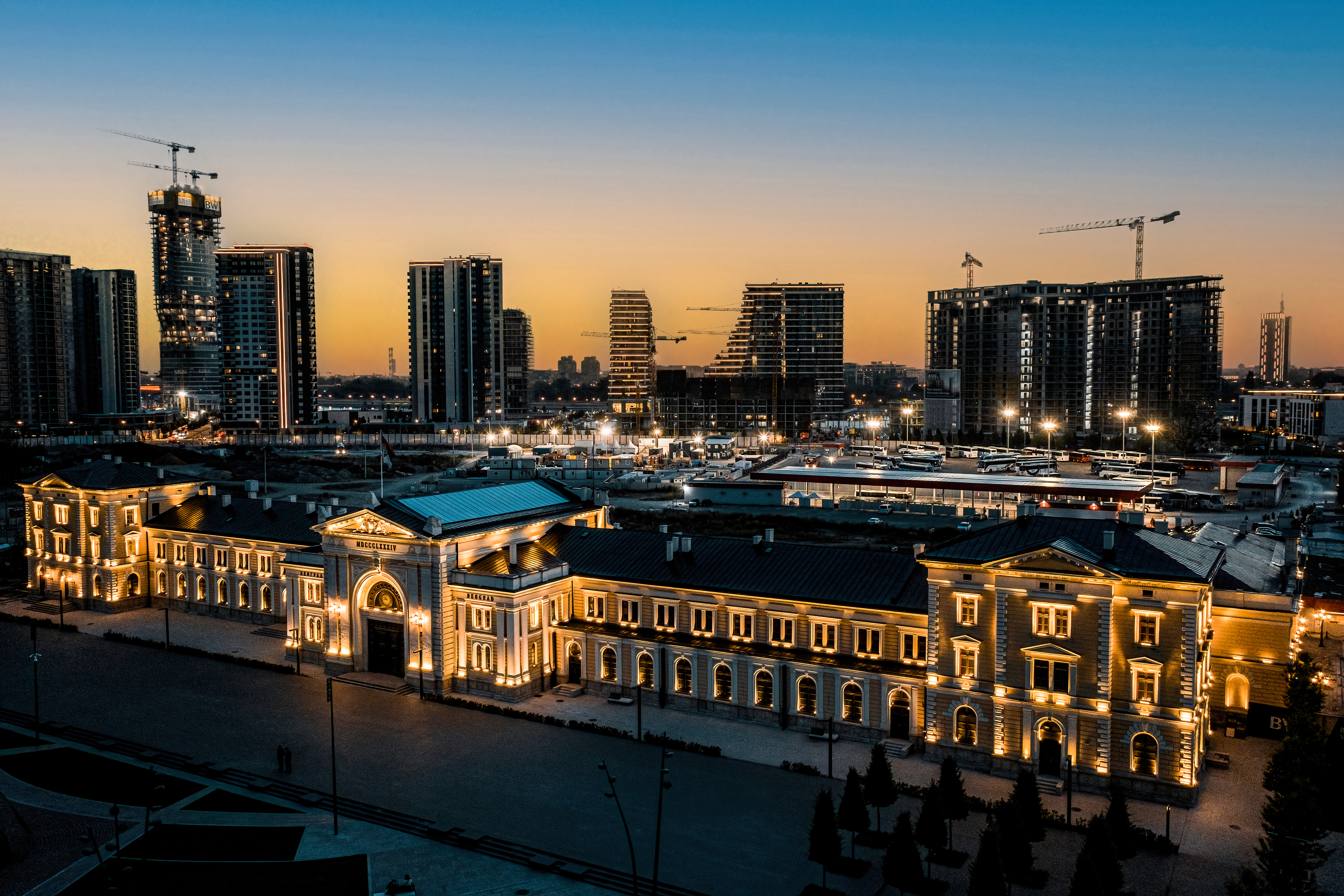
The Former Main Railway Station in Belgrade, with Belgrade Waterfront rising in the background

The idea of Belgrade Waterfront appeared for the first time on April 12, 2012, as a pre-election promise of Aleksandar Vučić, the candidate representing the Serbian Progressive Party. On December 12, 2012, Sheikh Muhammad bin Zayed from the United Arab Emirates and Mohamed Alabbar, the founder of Emaar Properties, came to Belgrade with a master plan for the Belgrade Waterfront. That was the first time that the size of the investment venture was stated, which First Deputy Prime Minister Aleksandar Vučić estimated at 3.1 billion dollars.

In 2014, the Government of the Republic of Serbia determined the Project of Arranging the Coast of Belgrade Belgrade Waterfront as a project of special importance for the Republic of Serbia and the city of Belgrade.

Even though the Sava Amphitheater area was relatively unoccupied, significant infrastructural interventions were needed. Some include removing the freight road traffic by building the Pupin Bridge and the road bypass around Belgrade. It was necessary to remove a significant number of tracks and the entire Main Railway Station from the current location to the Prokop station and partially to the New Belgrade station. In addition, the central bus station was also moved.

The project also includes improving the sewerage system and works on water, heating, gas, electric, telecommunications, and irrigation systems in the facilities. During the preparation of the Spatial Plan, it was stated that the amount for infrastructural land development was around 400 million euros, of which about 275 million is the cost of landscaping within the complex, and about 125 million for new facilities, extensions, and connections to other utilities, heating, sewerage, gas and extension lines across the city.

The first construction works on the site began in March 2014 with removing the rails and relocating many ships and wrecks that were stranded or moored to that part of the bank.

The building of the Belgrade Cooperative has been determined to be the seat of the company that will manage the project and perform promotion and sales. Since it has been in a neglected state for decades, the first thing done was reconstructing the building. The reconstruction took place between March and June 2014.

The master plan and model of the entire area of Belgrade Waterfront was presented on June 27, 2014, and exhibited in the renovated building of the Belgrade Cooperative. Prime Minister Vučić and the Eagle Hills company director Mohamed Alabbar presented the master plan, and it was announced that the investment should amount to 3.1 billion euros. The construction contract was signed on April 26, 2015, between Alabbar, who signed on behalf of the investor, and Deputy Prime Minister and Minister of Construction, Transport and Infrastructure Zorana Mihajlović and Director of Belgrade Waterfront Aleksandar Trifunović, who signed it on behalf of Serbia. The project envisaged the construction of 177 hectares of land in the center of Belgrade, with more than a million square meters of residential space, 750,000 square meters of business space, 62,000 square meters of public facilities, and 242,000 square meters of green space. The Republic of Serbia owns 32% of the capital, while Eagle Hills owns 68%, and the deadline for construction is set at 30 years.

The demolition of the old buildings began in August, and the construction of the first two residential buildings – BW Residences – started in September 2015.

== Construction ==
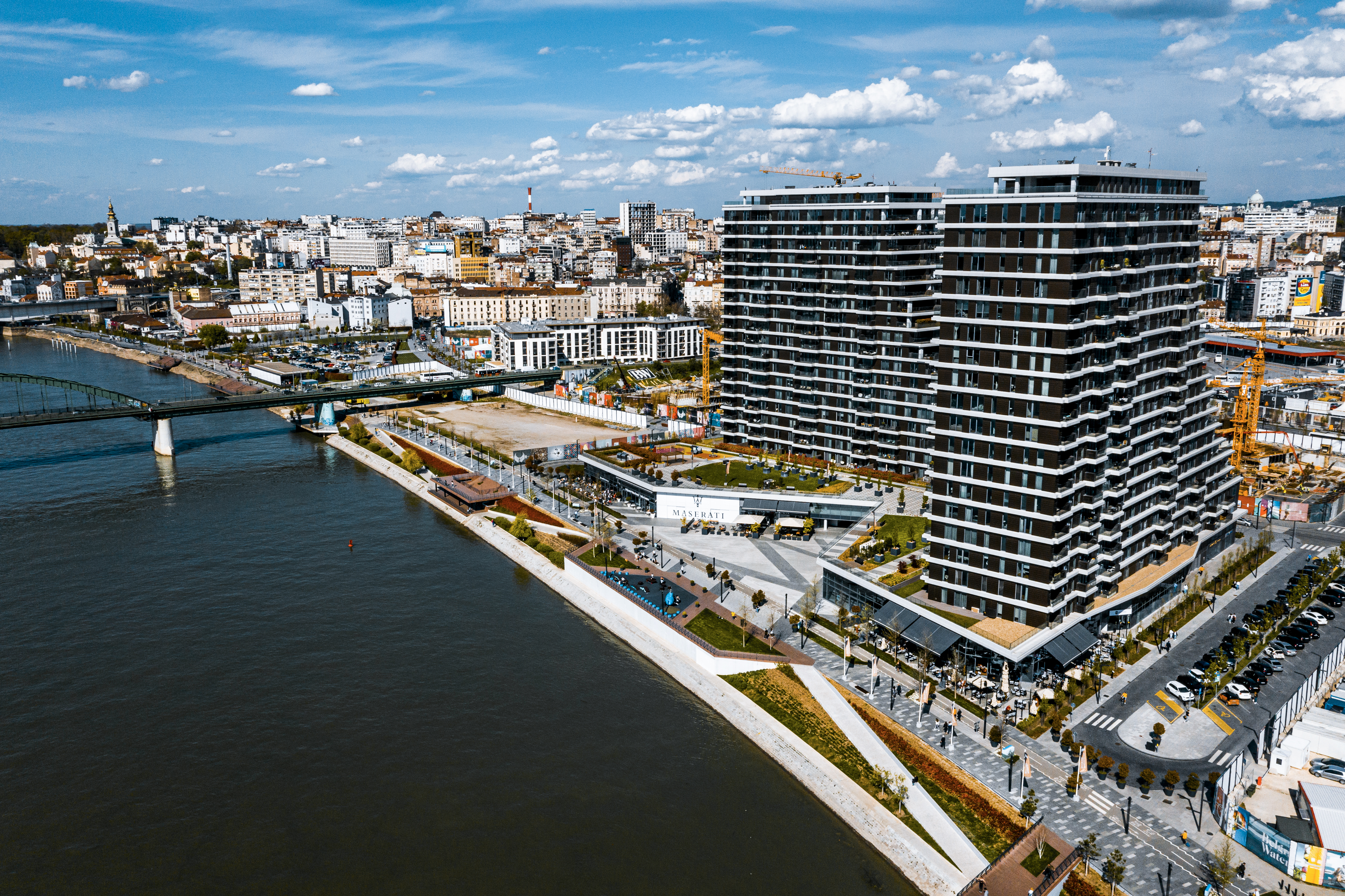
BW Residences residential towers (2021)

The construction is planned to take place in four phases. The first phase includes works in the central coastal part, with four business buildings, including the largest shopping center, Kula Belgrade, a part of the hotel complex, and the first residential building. The second phase includes arranging the space near Branko's bridge and between the Gazela bridge and the fairgrounds. This phase also involves constructing several residential buildings and the reconstruction of buildings protected by law. The third phase introduces the construction of the central part towards Savska Street and residential and business facilities. In the final, fourth phase, the plan includes constructing apartments and entertainment and cultural facilities.

BW Magnolia building, residential building with five floors and 110 units. Construction was started in 2018, and completed in 2020.

The building permit for the first facilities was issued on September 24, 2015. The cornerstone was laid on September 27, 2015, by Prime Minister Aleksandar Vučić and Eagle Hills chairman Mohamed Alabbar. The construction of BW Residences, two residential twenty-story buildings, started in the first phase. With an area of about 68,000 square meters, 72 meters high each, near the Old Sava Bridge, on the bank of the Sava, these buildings have 296 apartments. In 2018, all the apartments were sold out, with almost 300 families moving in the same year.

The cornerstone for the Kula Belgrade, was laid on April 15, 2016, by Prime Minister Vučić, the Mayor of Belgrade Siniša Mali and Eagle Hills chairman Alabbar. It was also announced that the Kula Belgrade would be 168 meters high, with 42 floors. The first 11 floors will be reserved for a luxury hotel, and floors above it will have 220 luxury apartments. On the top of the building will be a restaurant and a 360-degree observation deck.

The construction of Galerija Belgrade shopping center, with a gross area of 251,000 m2, began in April 2017, followed by the construction of two residential buildings – BW Vista and BW Parkview – later that year. Tenants of BW Vista and BW Parkview residential buildings moved in during September 2019, and Woodrow Wilson Boulevard and Belgrade Park opened in November of the same year. In 2020, new tenants moved into the BW Magnolia building.

Architectural visualization of BW Libera building, with Kula Belgrade and Galerija Belgrade Shopping center in the background.

On April 14, 2022, the Government of Serbia passed the amended Spatial Plan for the Development of the Coastal Area of the City of Belgrade - the Sava River Coastal Area for the Belgrade Waterfront project. The spatial plan envisages the further development of this part of the city and the construction of public service facilities, from kindergartens and schools, through health institutions, to cultural, sports and recreation facilities, including the two planned lines of the Belgrade Metro, as well as three metro stations - Belgrade Fair, Mostar and Sava Square. Those two planned metro lines will have a joint metro station in the area of Sava Square, directly next to the building of the former Railway Station.

=== Construction status ===
- BW Residences – Two residential towers on the Sava riverbank, with 20 floors each and 296 apartments in total. Construction was started on September 27, 2015, and completed in 2018.
- BW Parkview – Residential building with 23 floors and 244 units. Construction was started in December 2016 and completed in 2019.
- BW Vista – Residential building with 23 floors and 228 units. Construction was started in December 2016 and completed in 2019.
- BW Magnolia – Residential building with five floors and 110 units. Construction was started in 2018 and completed in 2020.
- BW Arcadia – Residential building with 24 floors and 244 apartments. Construction was started in 2019 and completed in 2021.
- BW Aurora – Residential and commercial tower with 23 floors, 244 apartments, and a height of 82 meters. Construction was started in 2019 and completed in 2021.
- BW Simfonija – Two residential buildings with an identical architectural expression. One building has 16 floors and 103 apartments; the other has 17 floors and 177 apartments. Construction was started in 2019 and completed in 2023.
- BW Verde – Residential building with 23 floors and 261 apartments. Construction was started in 2019 and completed in 2022.
- BW Terraces – Residential building with 17 floors and 132 apartments. Construction was started in 2020 and completed in 2022.
- BW Metropolitan – Residential building with 17 floors and 325 apartments, restaurants, and kindergarten. Construction was started in 2020 and completed in 2022.
- BW Aria – Residential building with 21 floors and 190 apartments. Construction was started in 2020 and completed in 2023.
- BW Aqua – Residential building with 23 floors and 248 apartments. Construction was started in 2020 and completed in 2023.
- BW Terra – Residential building with 19 floors and 153 apartments. Construction was started in 2020 and completed in 2023.
- BW Quartet – Residential complex consisting of 4 buildings with a total of 681 apartments. Construction was started in 2020, estimated completion date of 2024.
- BW Libera – Residential building with 16 floors and 169 apartments. Construction was started in 2021 and completed in 2023.
- BW Sole – Residential building with 16 floors and 184 apartments. Construction was started in 2021 and completed in 2023.
- BW Scala – Residential building with 13 floors and 223 apartments. Construction was started in 2021 and completed in 2023.
- BW Eterna – Residential building with eight floors and 223 apartments. Construction was started in 2021.
- BW Lumia – Residential building with nine floors and 91 apartments. Construction was started in 2021.
- BW Sensa – Residential building with eight floors and 230 apartments. Construction was started in 2021.
- BW Perla – Residential building with 25 floors and 189 apartments. Construction was started in 2022.
- BW Nika – Residential building with 18 floors and 219 apartments. Construction was started in 2022.
- BW Riviera – Residential building with 25 floors and 139 apartments. Construction was started in 2022.
- BW Echo – Residential building with eight floors and 103 apartments. Construction was started in 2022.
- BW King's Park Residences – Residential building with 15 floors and 233 apartments. Construction was started in 2022.
- BW Queen's Park Residences – Residential building with eight floors and 108 apartments. Construction was started in 2022.
- BW Eden – Residential building with 20 floors and 244 apartments.
- BW Thalia – Residential building with 15 floors and 178 apartments.
- BW Iris – Residential building with 18 floors and 219 apartments.
- Galerija Belgrade – The biggest shopping mall in the region, with 93,000 m^{2} of retail space. Construction was started in September 2017 and completed in 2020. It was opened on October 30, 2020.

View from ″Galerija Belgrade″ on Sava River and New Belgrade

Architectural visualization of BW Quartet residential complex, consisting of 4 buildings.

- Kula Belgrade – Residential and commercial building with 42 floors, 220 luxury apartments, and a 5-star hotel. Construction started on April 15, 2016.

== Kula Belgrade ==
Architectural visualization of 168 meters high Kula Belgrade

Kula Belgrade, 168 meters high, was envisaged as the Belgrade Waterfront's central point and the capital's future symbol. Kula Belgrade will be the country's highest hotel and residential tower featuring an observation deck and set to house luxurious St. Regis Belgrade.

Kula Belgrade was designed by design firm Skidmore, Owings & Merrill. Their other works include the 345 California Center building in San Francisco, the Hancock building, and Willis Tower in Chicago. Probably their most famous building is the Burj Khalifa in Dubai, the tallest building in the world. Kula Belgrade has unusual design that changes the shape of 14 floors, where the building "twists." It is inspired by the confluence of the Sava River and the Danube. The façade of glass panels reflects the rivers and the panorama of the city, which gives the appearance of fluidity. As the tallest building in Serbia, the Kula Belgrade will have an observation deck at the top with a panoramic view of the entire city. Interestingly, it is the first building in Serbia that will not have a 13th floor.

The St. Regis Belgrade hotel will occupy the first 11 floors of the Kula Belgrade and offer more than 100 rooms and suites looking out to the city or the Sava river. The hotel will feature a restaurant at the top of the tower with panoramic views, an all-day dining restaurant, a St. Regis Bar, spa, pool, and event and meeting space for special celebrations. Kula Belgrade will offer the first branded St. Regis apartments in Europe, the so-called The Residences at The St. Regis Belgrade.

Next to the Kula Belgrade, a new city square, Kula Plaza is located. The Plaza hosts concerts, festivals, markets, events, recreation, performances, and seasonal events such as a holiday market and ice skating. The Plaza space also extends the adjacent Kula Belgrade ballroom and provides a new venue for outdoor social events at that edge. The Kula Belgrade and Kula Plaza together take about 5-6000 square meters of space. Kula Plaza was designed by SWA Group.

== Amenities ==
In 2022, it was announced that a modern sports center called BW Apollo would be built in Belgrade Waterfront, including a swimming pool, a gym and a spa center.

In January 2023, it was announced that Belgrade Waterfront would get a bilingual elementary school, one of the few with a swimming pool, in an almost 5,000 square meters area. It will be located behind the buildings of the former Railway Station and Post Office on Sava Square and able to accommodate 480 students. The school will have courts for handball, basketball and volleyball. In February 2023 it was announced that Belgrade Waterfront would get "the most modern kindergarten ", in an area of 800 square meters, with a multifunctional hall for shows and performances. The kindergarten will also have a spacious courtyard and playground of 1400 square meters.

In 2020, it was announced that the new Historical Museum of Serbia would be located in Belgrade Waterfront, in the building of the former Railway Station on Sava Square. Next to it, the reconstructed building of the former Post Office would be home to two cultural institutions: an interactive children's museum and a children's theatre.

A unique attraction in Belgrade Waterfront will be Ložionica, an old industrial complex, now under state protection for its industrial and cultural importance. In February 2023, it was announced that the Government of the Republic of Serbia would invest 52 million euros in the reconstruction of Ložionica, which will be turned into the center of creative industries, digitalization and innovation. Ložionica complex will consist of the old Ložionica building, new business space, the old water tower next to Gazela Bridge, a space for outdoor activities and an underground garage.

=== Culture and events ===
On December 31, 2021, Belgrade Waterfront hosted New Year's Eve celebration on a plateau next to Kula Belgrade for the first time. Headliner was Goran Bregović. The celebration included an 8-minutes firework, laser show, and light effect on Kula Belgrade's facade. On December 31, 2022, Belgrade Waterfront hosted New Year's Eve celebration for the second time in a row at the same place. Headliner was Željko Joksimović.

In July 2022, for the first time, Belgrade Waterfront organized and hosted Belgrade River Fest. The headliners were Andrea Bocelli and Mariza. In June 2023, Belgrade Waterfront hosted the second Belgrade River Fest, with headliners Anna Netrebko, Yusif Eyvazov and Yasmin Levy.

In December 2022, Belgrade Waterfront hosted the "Winter Fairytale" festival for the first time, featuring open-air cinema, music programme, ice skating and other activities. The festival lasted 30 days and attracted more than 1,5 million visitors who enjoyed 150 performances, concerts, theatre, and movie shows for children and adults.

== Galerija Belgrade ==
Galerija Belgrade, a large shopping, dining, and entertainment center, was opened on October 30, 2020, in the presence of Eagle Hills Chairman Mohamed Alabbar, the President of Serbia Aleksandar Vučić, and Prime Minister Ana Brnabić. It has a total area of 300,000 sqm, the biggest green roof in the region, and 3,600 parking spaces. In addition to the biggest trampoline park in this part of Europe, there is also Cineplexx Galerija Belgrade – a multiplex cinema with nine halls and more than 1,700 seats.

Galerija Belgrade is the only place in Serbia where foreign visitors can get a VAT refund immediately after purchase at three points within the mall. This service is provided through cooperation with Global Blue.

== Revenue and profit ==
The revenue of the Belgrade Waterfront company in 2021 will amount to more than 140 million euros, and the estimated profit is expected to be over 25 million euros. The basic income of the company comes from the sale of real estate, which has been making significant progress over the years, with 3,000 apartments being sold since the beginning of the construction. In 2018 and 2019, total revenue was over 170 million euros.

Financial statements of the company Belgrade Waterfront d.o.o. show positive growth of over 11 million euros since the start of the project. The value of business assets is more than 700 million euros. In 2022, Belgrade Waterfront achieved business revenue of EUR 269.6 million, while the net profit for the same period amounted to 59.4 million euros. A total of EUR 10 million was set aside to pay dividends, part of which goes to the state budget.

In 2023, it was announced that the 6000th apartment in Belgrade Waterfront was sold.

== Criticism ==
In July 2014, a group of 50 international scholars and experts on urban development and planning from the International Network for Urban Research and Action (INURA) penned an open letter to the people of Belgrade, stating their concerns regarding the Belgrade Waterfront project and the potential economic and environmental impacts on the city.

Among Belgrade residents, there is a great deal of contempt for the project. The points criticised encompass the lacking of a public consultation process as well as the disconnect of the lifestyle of Belgrade's middle and upper classes on one hand and the target group of the developed apartments on the other hand. In addition to this, the intransparency and perceived backroom nature of the Belgrade Waterfront deal has caused real anger, expressed most visibly by the street protests organised by the movement Do not let Belgrade d(r)own, accusing the development of money laundering and corruption. In May 2016, thousands of people took to the street to protest against an incident where dozens of men with masks demolished buildings in the area, where the Belgrade Waterfront complex is planned to be built. Contrasting the allegations of the protesters, the government denies any responsibility in and knowledge of the event.

== See also ==
- Architectural projects under construction in Belgrade
- Serbia–United Arab Emirates relations
