= Hotel garni =

Variety of small hotel

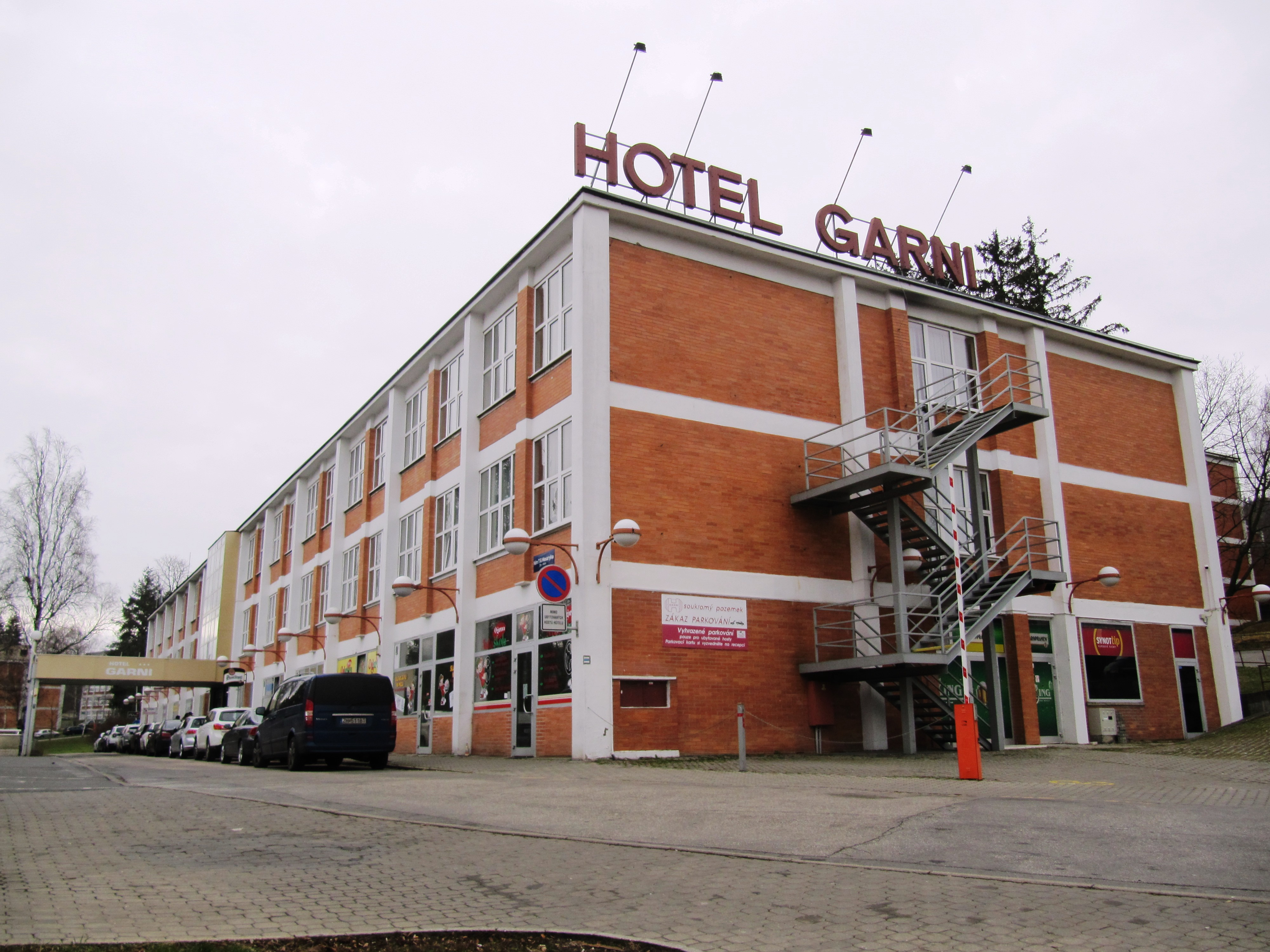
Hotel garni

A hotel garni is a hotel that offers accommodation, breakfast, drinks and, at most, snacks, but not the classical hotel restaurant. It is similar to a bed and breakfast but is designed and run as a hotel, not a private residence. The term is common in France and Germany.

The term hotel garni comes from the French and literally means "an inn provided (with guest facilities)". Hotels garnis are usually privately run and generally have fewer rooms than hotels that are part of a chain.

Hotels garni do not generally have an all-night reception and no night porter.

== See also ==
- Full board
- Half-board
