= Eagle Hills Properties =

Emirati real estate investment and development company

- Type: Private
- Industry: Real estate development
- Founded: 2014; 12 years ago
- Founder: Mohamed Alabbar
- Headquarters: Abu Dhabi, United Arab Emirates
- Area served: Middle East, Africa and Europe
- Key people: Mohamed Alabbar (chairman)
- Website: www.eaglehills.com

Eagle Hills Properties is a privately held real estate investment and development company headquartered in Abu Dhabi, United Arab Emirates. It was established in 2014 by Emirati businessman Mohamed Alabbar, the founder of Emaar Properties. Eagle Hills and Emaar are separate companies, although both are led by Alabbar.

The company develops large mixed-use districts, with an emphasis on waterfront and urban-regeneration sites. Its projects typically combine housing with hotels, shops, leisure facilities, public spaces and, in some cases, marinas. Major developments associated with Eagle Hills include Belgrade Waterfront in Serbia, Marassi Al Bahrain in Bahrain, Ramhan Island in Abu Dhabi, Maryam Island in Sharjah, Durrës Yachts & Marina in Albania, La Gare in Ethiopia and Riga Waterfront in Latvia. Several of the largest are undertaken through local project companies jointly owned with governments or government-related entities, with ownership shares that vary by project.

== History ==
Eagle Hills was established in January 2014, when Alabbar presented the proposed Belgrade Waterfront development on the company's behalf. A joint-investment agreement with the Serbian government was signed in April 2015, and construction of the first two residential buildings began that September.

The company then expanded through projects and partnerships in the Middle East and Africa. In Bahrain, it formed Eagle Hills Diyar with Diyar Al Muharraq to develop Marassi Al Bahrain, a residential, retail and hotel district on the coast of Muharraq. In 2018, a 50:50 venture with the Sharjah Investment and Development Authority announced three developments in Sharjah, including Maryam Island and Kalba Waterfront, and the company launched La Gare, a mixed-use redevelopment around the former railway station in Addis Ababa, Ethiopia.

During the 2020s, Eagle Hills added projects and acquisitions in the United Arab Emirates and Europe. It began marketing Ramhan Island, a residential and hospitality development on a natural island off Abu Dhabi, which was under construction by 2024. In January 2024, the company and Riga City Council signed a memorandum covering the proposed redevelopment of Andrejsala. In 2025, it entered a Georgian joint venture for projects in Tbilisi and Gonio and partnered with Italian asset manager COIMA on the planned restoration of the Grand Hôtel des Bains in Venice.

== Business and projects ==
=== Development model ===
Eagle Hills acts as investor, master developer and project partner, planning its large schemes as multi-phase districts rather than single buildings. Residential sales are paired with income-producing or visitor uses such as hotels, shopping centres, restaurants and marinas, and the company has worked with international hospitality brands including Mandarin Oriental, St. Regis, Address and Bvlgari. It uses a mixture of wholly owned subsidiaries and joint ventures; public bodies hold stakes in its Sharjah, Bahrain, Belgrade, Durrës and Georgia development companies.

=== United Arab Emirates ===
The company's principal projects in the United Arab Emirates are in Abu Dhabi and Sharjah. Ramhan Island is planned as a 400-hectare development containing villas, marina residences, a hotel and a retail promenade. In Sharjah, Maryam Island is a residential and hospitality development created through the company's partnership with Shurooq, while Kalba Waterfront combines retail and leisure uses.

In 2025, Eagle Hills and Bvlgari Hotels & Resorts announced the Bvlgari Resort & Mansions Abu Dhabi, planned for a private island near the Abu Dhabi Corniche. The development includes a hotel, villas, residences and a marina, and is scheduled to open in 2030.

=== Middle East and Africa ===
Marassi Al Bahrain is a coastal development within Diyar Al Muharraq, launched as a joint venture containing housing, a shopping centre, two hotels and serviced residences. Eagle Hills also jointly developed the Mandarin Oriental, Muscat, a hotel and branded-residence complex in Shatti Al-Qurum, which opened in June 2024 as Mandarin Oriental Hotel Group's first property in Oman.

In Ethiopia, La Gare is planned as a residential, commercial, hospitality and retail district on about 360,000 square metres around Addis Ababa's former railway station. In Jordan, the company's portfolio has included the St. Regis Amman, W Amman, its Skyline Residences, Saraya Aqaba and projects at Marsa Zayed.

=== Europe ===
Belgrade Waterfront, on the right bank of the Sava in Serbia, was Eagle Hills' first widely reported development. Construction began in 2015, and completed elements include residential buildings, the Galerija Belgrade shopping centre and Kula Belgrade, a 168-metre tower containing the St. Regis Belgrade.

In Albania, Durrës Yachts & Marina is a redevelopment of the former commercial-port area into a marina and mixed-use waterfront district; the project company is 67 per cent privately owned and 33 per cent state-owned. In Latvia, the Riga Waterfront proposal covers about 57 hectares at Andrejsala and is intended to be developed in stages over 10 to 15 years; the 2024 memorandum referred to more than 6,500 homes, a passenger terminal and public waterfront space.

Eagle Hills also expanded into European hospitality through acquisitions and restoration projects. In 2021, its Croatian subsidiary acquired 69.7 per cent of Sunce Hoteli, operator of the Bluesun Hotels & Resorts brand, whose portfolio then comprised 11 hotels, a campsite and other tourism assets. In 2025, Eagle Hills and COIMA agreed to acquire legacy debt tied to Venice's Grand Hôtel des Bains, clearing the way for a proposed €200 million restoration. The same year, the company created a joint venture with the Georgian government (Eagle Hills 66.7 per cent, the state 33.3 per cent) for Tbilisi Waterfront and Gonio Yachts & Marina, and announced EcoVillage Shas, an eco-tourism and residential development near Ulcinj, Montenegro, which remained at the design and approvals stage in early 2026.

== Controversies ==
=== Hungary ===
In January 2025, following a 2024 agreement between Hungary and the United Arab Emirates, the Hungarian state agreed to sell the 85-hectare former Rákosrendező railway site in Budapest to Eagle Hills for 51 billion forints. Eagle Hills proposed a mixed-use district named Grand Budapest, with investment estimates ranging from €5 billion to €12 billion.

Budapest's city council voted to exercise a pre-emption right over the site through the municipally owned utility company BKM. Mayor Gergely Karácsony said the city preferred “affordable housing and a lot of green space for many, rather than luxury for a few”. In March 2025, the Hungarian government confirmed that BKM had replaced Eagle Hills as the buyer, and the Grand Budapest development did not proceed.

=== Serbia ===
The Belgrade Waterfront project was criticised for being planned with little public consultation, which prompted protests in the capital. A linked plan for a Trump-branded tower, involving Jared Kushner's Affinity Partners, drew further protests over its approval process; the project, Trump Tower Belgrade, was pushed through by a "special law" passed in November 2025.

=== Georgia ===
Eagle Hills' 2025 entry into Georgia drew criticism after the government classified its agreement as commercially confidential; economists and opposition figures called for disclosure of the land-transfer and investment terms.
