= Lavoslav Horvat =

Croatian architect

Lavoslav Horvat (Croatian pronunciation: [lâʋoslaʋ xǒrʋat]; Varaždinske Toplice, 27 September 1901 – Novi Marof, 4 October 1989) was a Croatian architect.

In 1926, Horvat enrolled as one of the first students of architecture at the Department of Architecture of the Academy of Fine Arts, University of Zagreb, under professor Drago Ibler.

He was the architect of the Hotel Jugoslavija in Belgrade, Serbia.
