= Mohamed Alabbar =

Emirati businessman (born 1956)

- محمد علي العبار
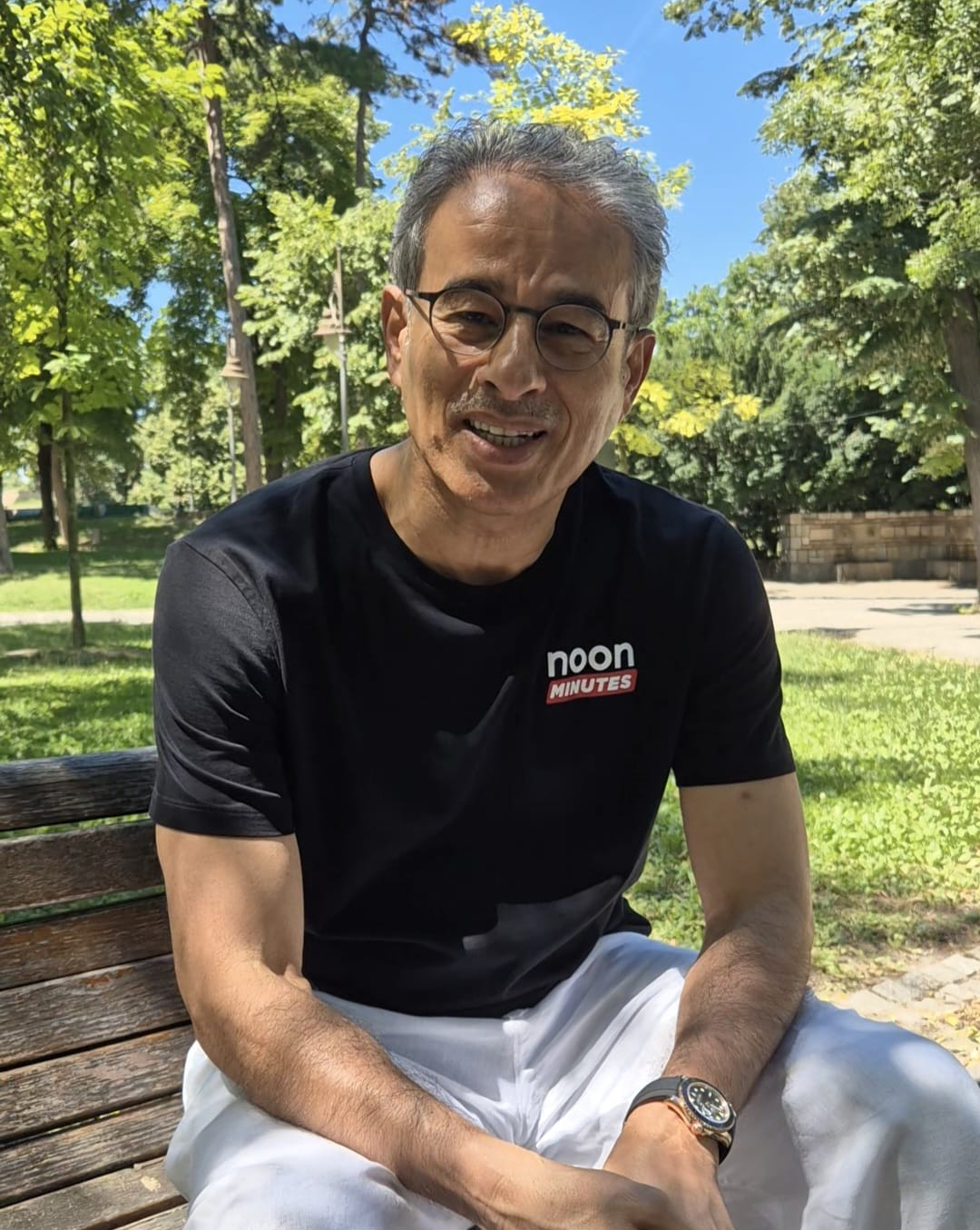
- Born: November 8, 1956 (age 69); Dubai, United Arab Emirates
- Education: Seattle University (1981)
- Occupations: Businessman, Investor
- Known for: Emaar Properties; Eagle Hills Properties
- Children: 7 (Rashed Alabbar, Salama Alabbar, Shamsa Alabbar, Mouza Alabbar, Ali Alabbar, Noon Alabbar, Haya Alabbar)
- Website: mohamedalabbar.com

Mohamed Ali Alabbar (Arabic: محمد علي العبار; born November 8, 1956) is an Emirati businessman known for founding Emaar Properties, a real estate development company involved in projects such as the Burj Khalifa and the Dubai Mall. He is also the founder and chairman of Eagle Hills, a private investment and real estate development company based in Abu Dhabi.

In addition, Alabbar established Noon.com, an e-commerce platform, and serves as the chairman of Americana Group, a food company.

== Early life ==
Mohamed Alabbar was born on November 8, 1956, in Dubai, United Arab Emirates, and is the eldest of 12 children. His father was the captain of a traditional trading vessel known as a dhow and raised his children in the Rashidiya area of Dubai.

In the 1970s, Alabbar received a government scholarship to study finance and business administration from The Albers School of Business and Economics at Seattle University. Alabbar graduated from Seattle University in 1981 with a degree in Business Administration. He also received an honorary doctoral degree in humanities from his alma mater in 2007 and served on its Board of Trustees until 2016.

== Career ==
After college, Alabbar began his career with the Central Bank of the United Arab Emirates as a banking manager. In 1992, Alabbar returned to Dubai and began working for the government as the founding director general of the Department of Economic Development.

During his career, Alabbar established a close relationship with Sheikh Mohammed bin Rashid Al Maktoum, the Ruler of Dubai, where he later became one of Sheikh Mohammed's chief economic advisers. Alabbar worked with Sheikh Mohammed bin Rashid Al Maktoum to improve the development and growth of both Dubai's tourism industry and global reputation.

He has overseen the expansion of Emaar Properties into various sectors including residential, retail, and hospitality. Alabbar also established RSH, a Singapore-based company specializing in marketing, distributing, and retailing international fashion brands, where he continues to be a significant shareholder.

Through his company, Alabbar Enterprises, he acquired stakes in luxury fashion retailer YOOX Net-a-Porter. Additionally, he is the founder and chairman of Africa Middle East Resources (AMER) and serves as the chairman of Tradewinds Corporation, a Malaysian company focused on leisure and hospitality.

Mohamed Alabbar is also involved in the construction of Dubai Creek Tower. In a major update, he has said that Creek Tower of Dubai, which was supposed to be the world’s tallest tower, is now being redesigned as ‘Female Burj Khalifa.’

=== Board memberships ===
Alabbar chairs Eagle Hills, a UAE-based real estate development company. He served on the board of Emaar Malls until 2021, when the company merged with Emaar Properties. Alabbar also sits on the board of Noor Investment Group, an affiliate of Dubai Group. He is on the board of trustees of the American University of Sharjah and the FII Institute in the KSA. He is also the Chairman of Zand, Dubai's first digital bank that aims to cater to retail and corporate clients.
