= Mercator Center Belgrade =

- Меркатор Центар Београд
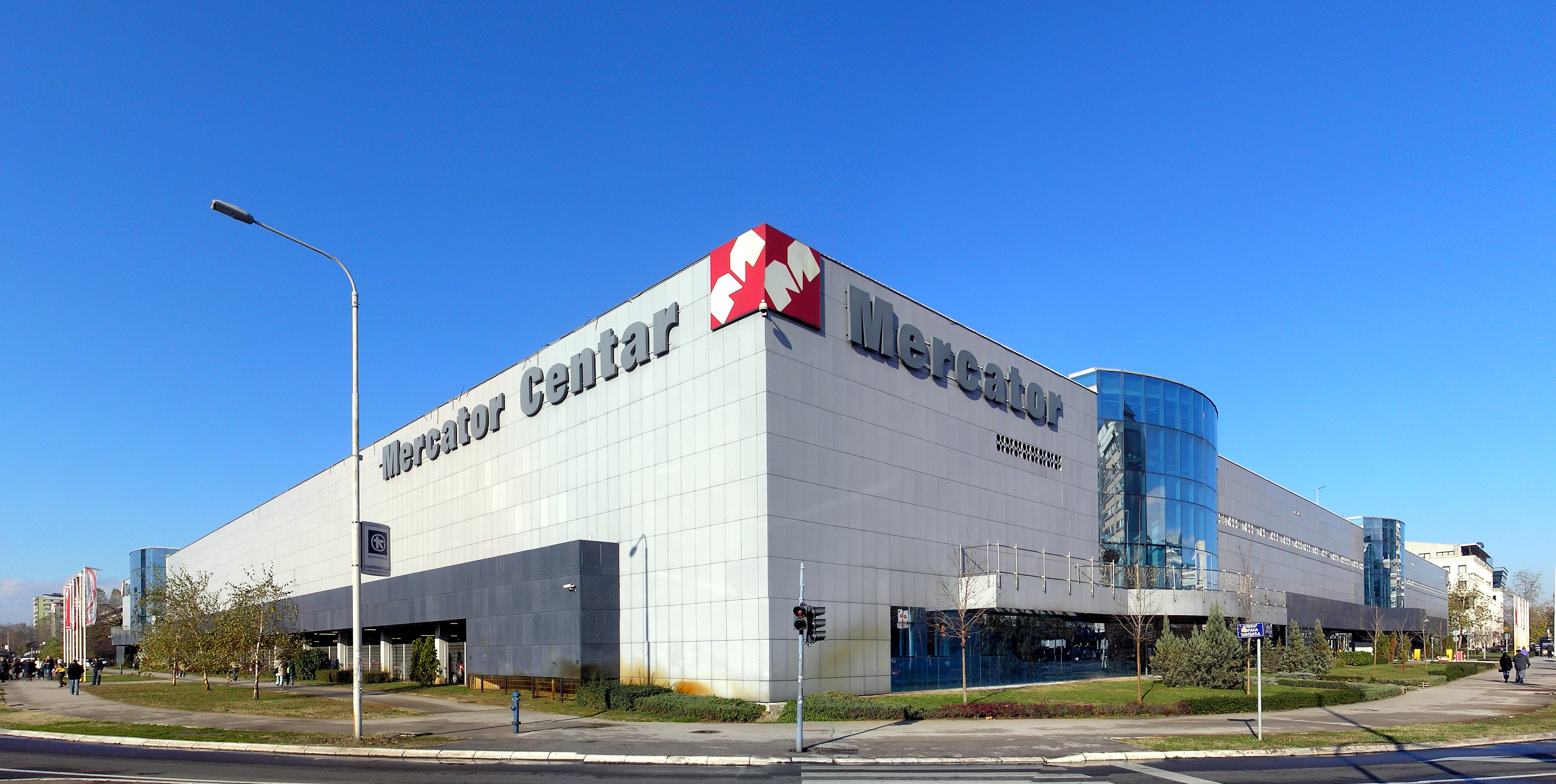
- Mercator Center Belgrade in 2010
- Interactive map of the Mercator Center Belgrade area

General information
- Status: Completed
- Location: New Belgrade, Serbia
- Coordinates: 44.82052°N 20.41411°E
- Completed: 2002
- Owner: MPC Holding

Technical details
- Floor area: 8,600 m^{2} (92,600 sq ft)

Mercator Center Belgrade (Serbian: Меркатор Центар Београд), located in Belgrade's municipality of New Belgrade, is the biggest Mercator Serbia Center in the retail chain.

== Old Mercator ==
The first Mercator center was opened in 1972, also in New Belgrade, but at a different location. It is located along the Mihaila Pupina Boulevard. At the time of opening, it was city's "pride", and one of the first shopping malls in Belgrade. With Fontana, Hotel Jugoslavija, SIV building and CK building, it was considered one of the symbols of New Belgrade. It was built as the "grandiose" structure, made from reinforced concrete, and resembling a "fallout shelter".

Apart from the numerous stores, shops, cafes and restaurants, in the southern extension it had a farmers market. It was the first indoor farmers market in Belgrade. Restaurant "Pri Majolka", later renamed "Vojvodina", was one of the most popular in New Belgrade. The northern extension hosted cinema "Jugoslavija". The building was expanded and renovated in the early 1990s, when the name Mercator was officially dropped, but unofficially remained until today. During the economic collapse in the 1990s, a flea market developed in front of the mall, along the boulevard.

After the opening of the new Mercator Center, the former one became known as the Old Mercator. Though still in use, it was left without proper maintenance since the early 1990s. By the 2020s, the structure deteriorated, with many empty shops, broken concrete parts and staircases. The flea market was formed again. In January 2021, part of the ceiling above the farmers market collapsed, injuring several people. The collapsed area was left to the elements and in July 2023 city announced plan to turn this section into the parking.

== Mercator Center Belgrade ==
Mercator Center Belgrade was opened in December 2002. Mercator Center Belgrade has 52,400 square meters with 74 stores and Mercator hypermarket (8,600 square meters). The construction cost 38 million euros. In 2012, the facility was upgraded; the cost was 12 million euros.

In December 2017, Mercator Serbia sold it to the Serbian holding company MPC Holding owned by Serbian businessman Petar Matić, for a sum of 46 million euros.
