= Palace of Serbia =

Government building in Belgrade, Serbia

- Палата Србије
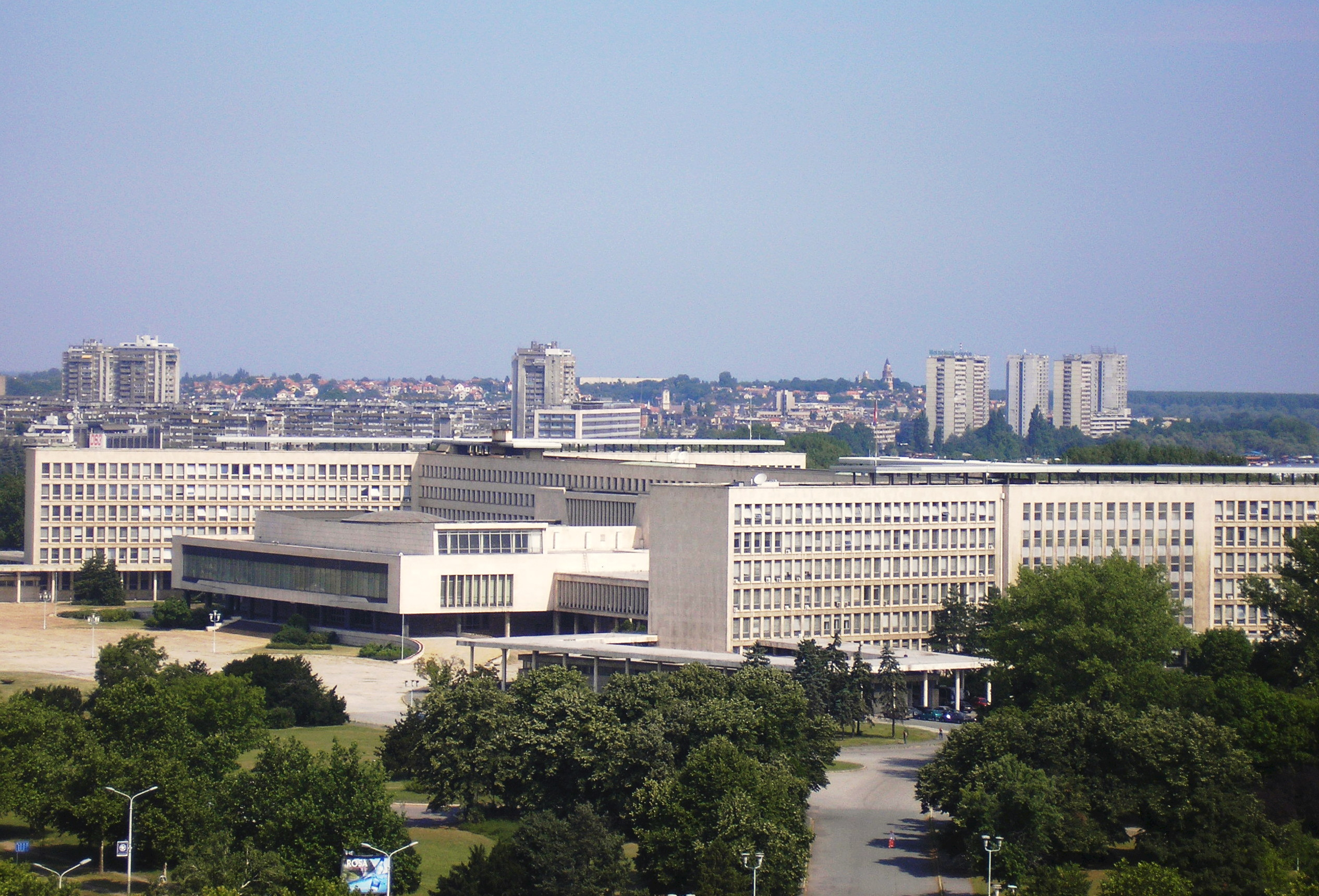

- Location in Belgrade

General information
- Location: Belgrade, Bulevar Mihajla Pupina 2
- Coordinates: 44°49′13″N 20°25′40″E
- Construction started: 1947
- Completed: 1959
- Owner: Government of Serbia

Technical details
- Floor area: 65,000 m^{2} (700,000 sq ft)

Design and construction
- Architect: Mihailo Janković
- Other designers: Vladimir Potočnjak, Anton Urlih, Zlatko Nojman, Dragica Perak

The Palace of Serbia (Serbian: Палата Србије, romanized: Palata Srbije) is a government building currently housing several government ministries and site for state visits of foreign head of states to Serbia. It is located in New Belgrade, Belgrade.

== Name ==
The official name of the building is Palace of the Federal Executive Council (Serbian: Палата Савезног извршног већа, romanized: Palata Saveznog izvršnog veća; abbr. SIV) as it was originally used by the Federal Executive Council of Yugoslavia and is registered by that name in the Registry of Cultural Heritage Properties. In the 1990s, after the disintegration of the Socialist Federal Republic of Yugoslavia, the building was informally known as the Palace of the Federation (Serbian: Палата Федерације, romanized: Palata Federacije), and after the restoration of independence of Serbia in 2006, the building got its name "Palace of Serbia", although it has never been officially renamed.

== History ==
=== Palace of the Federal Executive Council ===
Architectural design competition for the new building of the Federal Executive Council of Yugoslavia was announced in 1946. The accepted project from the group of architects from Zagreb included the exterior 'H' shape designed by lead architect Vladimir Potočnjak and his team: Anton Urlih, Zlatko Nojman and Dragica Perak.

The Palace was initially conceived as the part of the public ensemble of public buildings, but such programme was reduced by the adoption of the General Urban Plan of the City of Belgrade in 1950, according to which the Palace, along with the Hotel Yugoslavia, remained secluded on the right bank of the Danube. Other planned objects next to it included the Museum of the Revolution, in the section between the building, the modern Central Committee of the League of Communists of Yugoslavia, and the planned building of the Radio Television Belgrade.

Construction began in 1948 but was halted only a year later. By that time, only the "skeletons" of the side wings and part of the central annex were finished. The project was taken over by Mihailo Janković who designed the interior of the structure and oversaw its construction when the construction works resumed works in 1955 until completion in 1959. The original plans were designed according to the Socialist realism aesthetics, as Yugoslavia at that time was an ally of the Soviet Union. However, after the Tito–Stalin split in 1948, many things in the state changed, so the new project by Janković was Modernistic instead.

The building was constructed by the Youth Work Brigades from all around Yugoslavia. Janković significantly changed the original design by adding some new elements and not leaving much of the original project, except for the overall H shape. The central annex on the river side was demolished and instead of one main entrance, two were projected, with the ceremonial one being the one in the modern Bulevar Mihajla Pupina. The design by an architect Janković and his team also brought in significant changes in interior organization. He kept the urban disposition, basic measures and mutual relations of certain tracts from the original design, whereas the main changes concerned the interior spatial organization. According to the altered design, the central part with the Banquet Hall, all the annexes around the building as well as the façade were constructed. By shifting the main entrance to the southern side, the entire building got accentuated orientation towards the future settlement. Along with the representative hall placed on the first floor of the newly designed annex, a number of extra lounges, conference halls, twenty-eight cabinets for the members of the Federal Executive Council, about sixty offices for the administration, as well as the following space for garaging vehicles were anticipated by the new programme of the interior design.

The first session of the Federal Executive Council in the new building was held at 29 April 1961. The Palace of the Federal Executive Council, later Palace of Serbia, received many foreign statesmen and delegations ever since.

=== Palace of the Federation ===
In the 1990s, after the disintegration of the Socialist Federal Republic of Yugoslavia, building was informally known as the Palace of the Federation and was used as the seat of almost all federal institutions of the newly-formed Federal Republic of Yugoslavia (later renamed State Union of Serbia and Montenegro): the Federal Government (later renamed Council of Ministers) and the Prime Minister, federal ministries (with the exception of Ministry of Foreign Affairs), and the Federal Constitutional Court.

=== Palace of Serbia ===
Since the dissolution of the State Union of Serbia and Montenegro, the building is used as the seat of several cabinet-level ministries: Ministry of Internal Affairs (housed in the west wing), Ministry of Environmental Protection, Ministry of Human and Minority Rights and Social Dialogue, Ministry of Family Welfare and Demography, Ministry of Rural Welfare, Ministry of Tourism and Youth, and the Ministry of Sports, as well as the Office for Kosovo and Metohija.

==== Ceremonial site for state visits ====
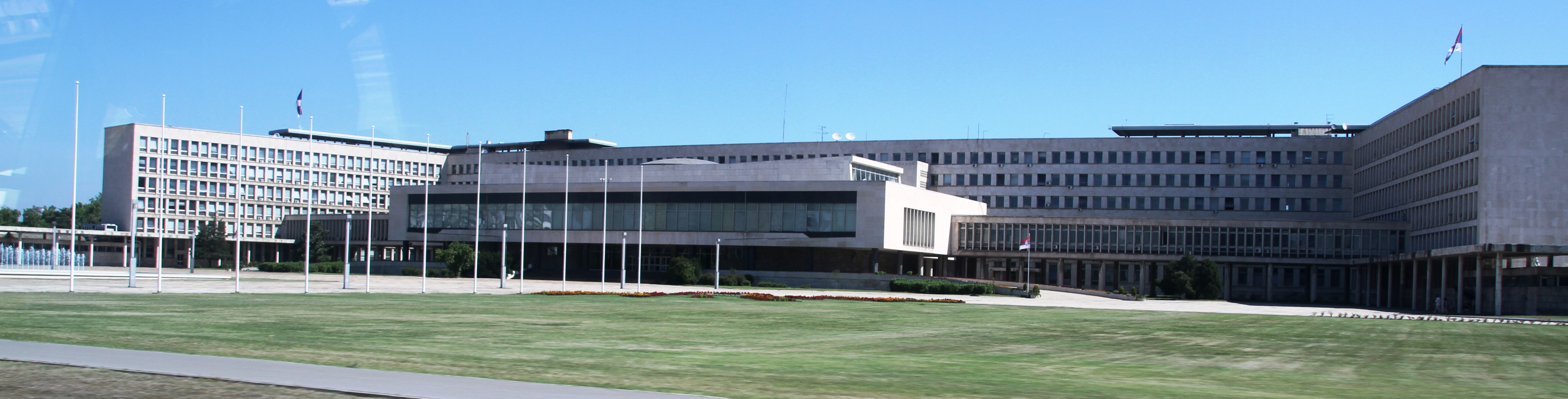
Plateau and Central Annex, site for state visits of foreign heads of states

The Palace of Serbia is used as site for reception ceremonies for state visits of foreign heads of states. On the plateau in front of the Central Annex of the palace, the visiting head of state is greeted upon arrival by the President of the Republic, followed by the playing of the two national anthems by a Band of the Guard of the Serbian Armed Forces and review of Honor Guard Battalion of the Guard of the Serbian Armed Forces. The ceremony is concluded with introduction of the delegation accompanying the visiting head of state as well as the delegation of the President of Serbia. It is then followed by the bilateral meetings in one of the salons of the Central Annex.

== Architecture ==
Its H-shaped base covers an area of approximately 65,000 m^{2} (700,000 sq ft) thus making Palace of Serbia the largest building by area in the country. Palace of Serbia consists of 744 offices, about 30 m^{2} each, 13 conference rooms, six salons, three large halls and two garages.

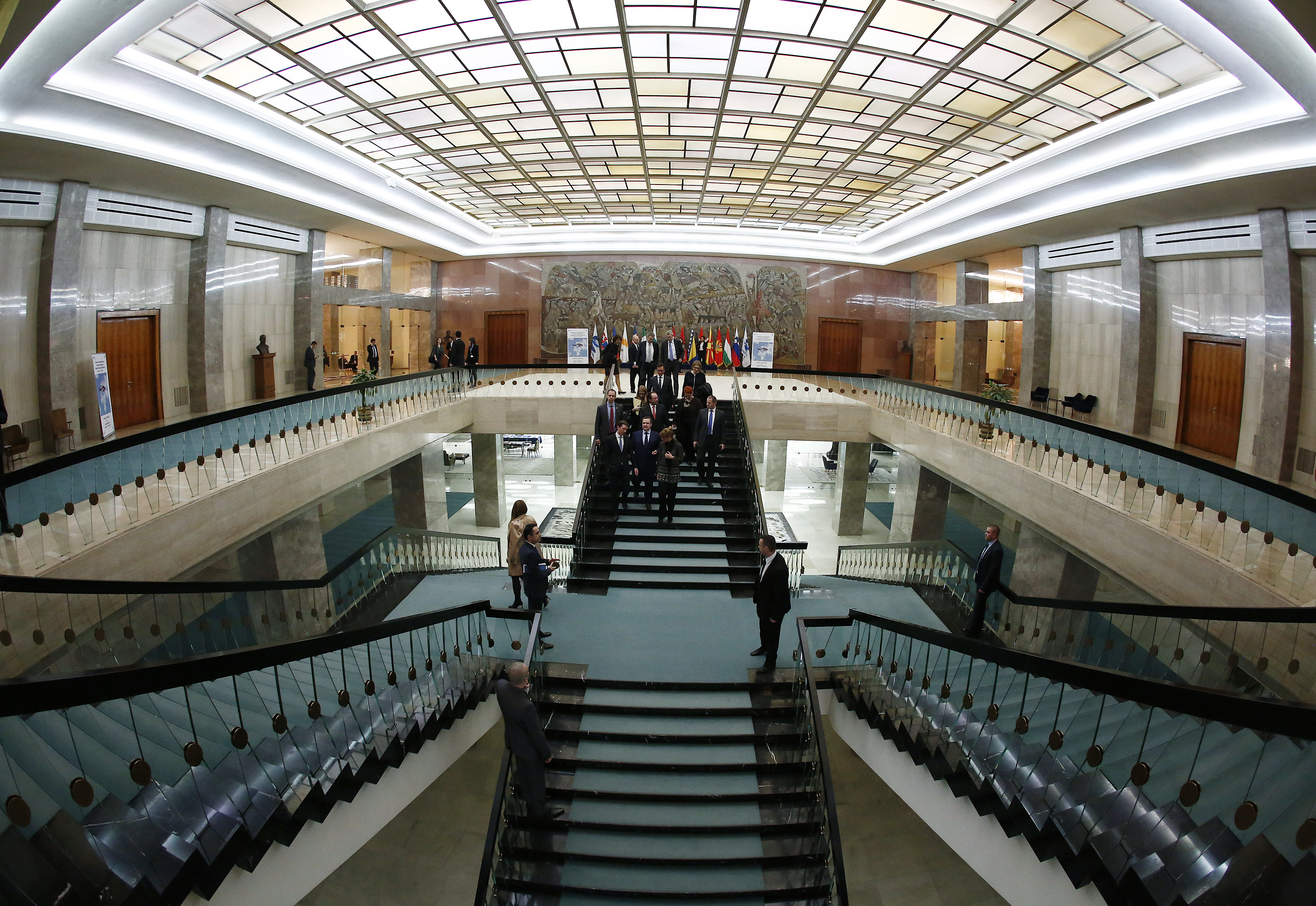
Great Hall, Central Annex

The building was constructed in the mixed stripped down classicist (the main structure) and modernist (the glass domed great hall with front entrance) architectural styles. Common misconception about the building, due to lack of such buildings in Belgrade in general, is that it is an example of Socialist Realism/Stalinist style in architecture. While it is the most monumental building of the early socialist period, unfamiliar with Soviet construction of the time, yet familiar with the term used for it, come to this obviously erroneous conclusion.

The representative exterior matches the luxuriously designed interior, also realized according to the architect Mihailo Janković's design, which places this building among the pioneer examples of the „total design“ in domestic architecture. The unique interior design, with numerous works of fine and applied arts, gives the building the character of some kind of a gallery of Yugoslav Modern art. The interior, as well as the exterior design was supposed to reflect the power, the greatness, the stability and the integrity of new Yugoslavia. The interior decoration design included artistic decoration of the walls with the mosaic technique, graffiti and fresco-painting, as well as by placing free-standing sculptures and reliefs, which was the specific assignment given to the special artistic commission. The design of the lounges dedicated to all six of the federal republics of the former Socialist Federal Republic of Yugoslavia, located in the central part of the palace, was based on the accentuation of the traditional motifs, characteristic for every federal unit of the country. The Yugoslav Salon represented the largest and at the same time the most representative room in the palace. The peculiar design of this salon was seen in the monumental frescoes by Petar Lubarda, and Lazar Vujaklija, as well as the triptych-mosaic The Creation of Yugoslavia, the work of Mladen Srbinović. The solemn character of this room was particularly emphasized by the crystal chandelier hanging from the dome, with more than two thousand five hundred light bulbs, and the weight of nine tons.

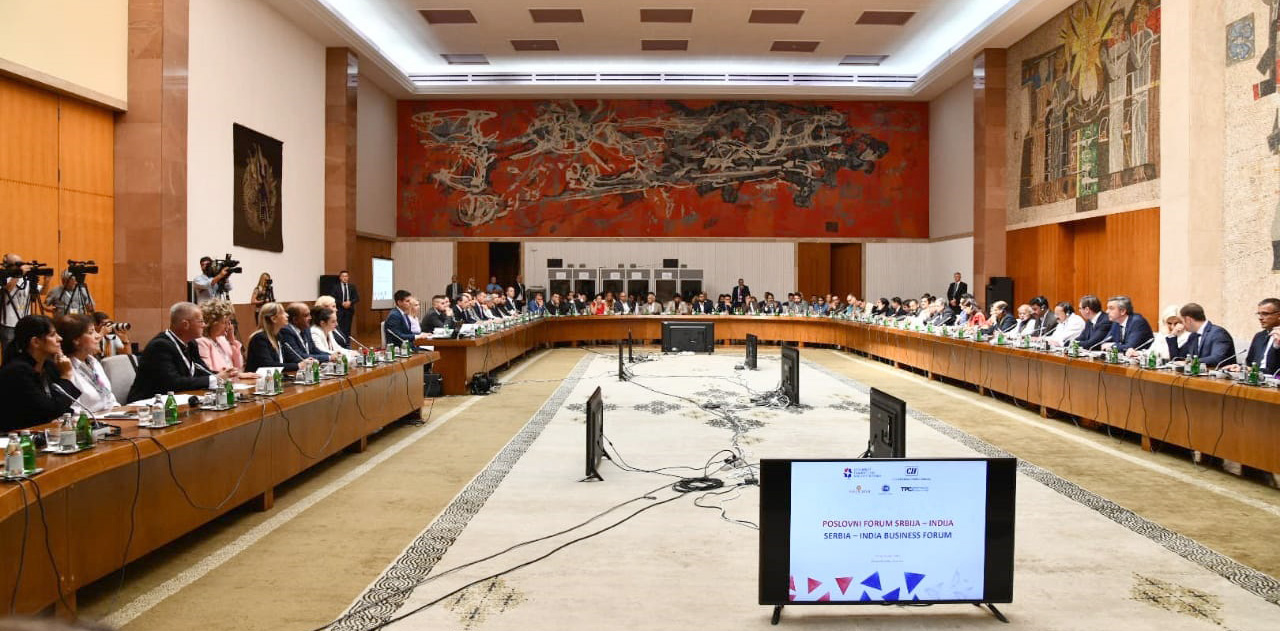
Main Salon, Central Annex

The works of Yugoslav's fine and applied arts characterize the interior design of the building. Among them, the ones which particularly stand out for their artistic, cultural and historical importance are the works of the following authors: Petar Lubarda, Antun Augustinčić, Frano Kršinić, Matija Vuković, Ante Gržetić, Sava Sandić, Vincent Beneš, Boža Ilić, Đorđe Andrejević Kun, Predrag-Peđa Milosavljević, Stojan Aralica, Bora Baruh, Lazar Ličenoski, Branislav Nemet, Vera Čohadžić, France Slana, Milivoj Uzelac, Ferdo Majer, Lazar Vujaklija, Mladen Srbinović, Matija Rodiči, Branko Subotić-Sube, Jože Ciuha, Lazar Vozarević, Janez Bernik, Vojo Dimitrijević, Drago Tihec, Milan Konjović, Ivan Radović, Marinko Benzon, Boško Petrović, Ratomir Stojadinović, Dragi Trajanovski, Jovan Bijelić, Zora Petrović, Olivera Kangrga, Vojin Bakić, Ignjat Job, Boško Petrović, Olivera Petrović, Olivera Galović, Milica Zorić, Lazar Vozarević, Oton Gliha, Jagoda Bujić, Vida Jocić, Milo Milunović, Sreten Stojanović, Risto Stijović, Mira Sandić, Nebojša Mitrić, Andrej Jemec, Drago Tršar, Branko Filipović-Filo, Drago Ordev, Slavko Atanasovski Krstanče, Bogosav Živković, Tone Kralj, Ratomir Gligorijević, Jovan Rakidžić, Stevan Dukić, Marin Pregelj, Drinka Radovanović.

In front of the medium wing there is a Central Annex, lower area covered with the glass dome where the Main Salon is located, covering 8,000 m^{2} (86,000 sq ft) with capacity of 2,000 invitees.

The building was constructed according to the system of the reinforced concrete skeleton structure, filled with bricks. The façade of the building is covered with the white Brač marble, whereas the openings were made of white metal.

With its architectural values, the Palace of the Federal Executive Council marked the period of creating the recognizable image of Novi Beograd and Belgrade in general. It is one of the most distinctive landmarks of Novi Beograd and its firm urban hierarchy. The aesthetic and visual values of the building are emphasized with the special park design of the surrounding, with the accesses, parking lot, garages and the fountain, as well as with the general position of the building, which enables its incessant overview. Within the design of the immediate surroundings of the palace, and for the purpose of the visiting of the members of high delegations, the construction of the Park of Friendship was started, as one of the most specific green areas in the entire world.

In 2013, the palace, along with the works of fine and applied arts, which constitute its integral part, was inscribed on the list of immovable cultural property as the cultural monument.

== See also ==
- List of buildings in Belgrade
