= Mihailo Janković =

Serbian architect

- Born: 1911; Belgrade, Kingdom of Serbia
- Died: 1976 (aged 64–65); Belgrade, SFR Yugoslavia
- Occupation: Architect
- Buildings: Ušće Tower; Building of former SIV; Museum of Yugoslav History
- Projects: Partizan Stadium; Tašmajdan Sports Centre

Mihailo Janković (Serbian: Михаило Јанковић) was a Yugoslav architect who designed a few of the important structures in Serbia whilst a part of Yugoslavia.

He designed "The stadium JNA" - now known as Partizan Stadium (1951), building of SIV (1961) and Museum of May 25. His most important project was skyscraper CK (1961) now known as Ušće Tower.

Mihailo Janković died in 1976.
