= Guard of the Serbian Armed Forces =

Honour guard unit of the Serbian Armed Forces

- Гарда Војске Србије
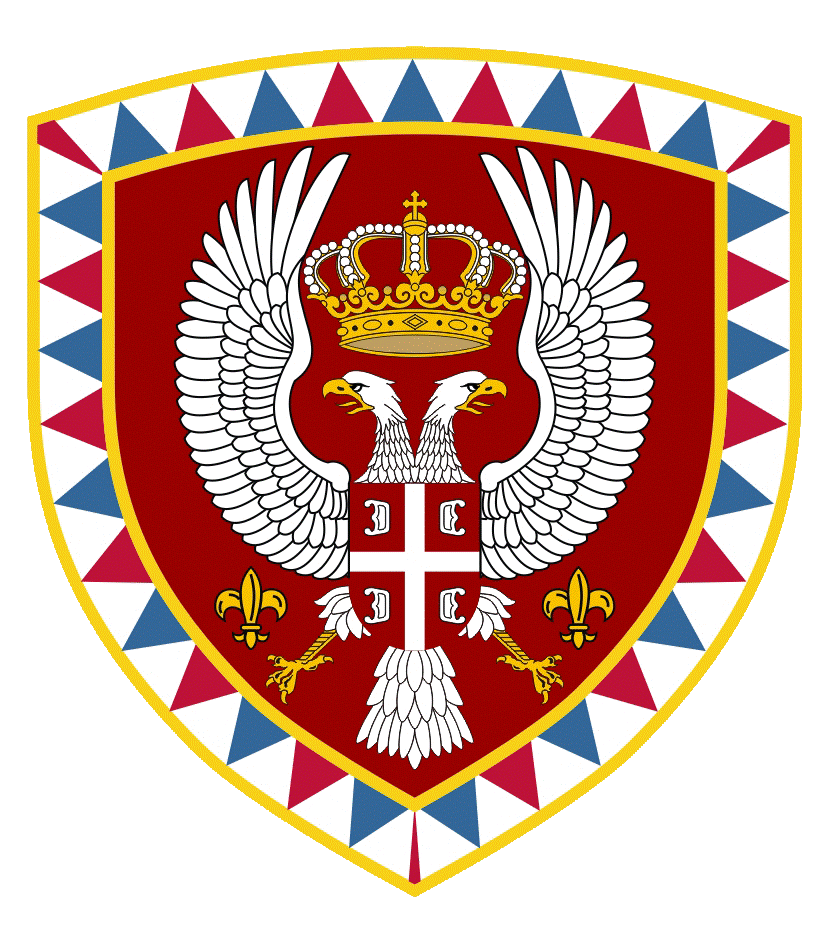
- Active: 1830–present
- Country: Serbia
- Branch: Serbian General Staff
- Type: Honor Guard; Security
- Size: Brigade
- Part of: Serbian Armed Forces
- Garrison/HQ: Topčider, Belgrade
- March: Guard March (Gardijski marš)
- Anniversaries: 6 May
- Engagements: World War I; Croatian War of Independence; Battle of Vukovar

Commanders
- Current commander: Brigadier General Vladimir Vukajlović

Insignia
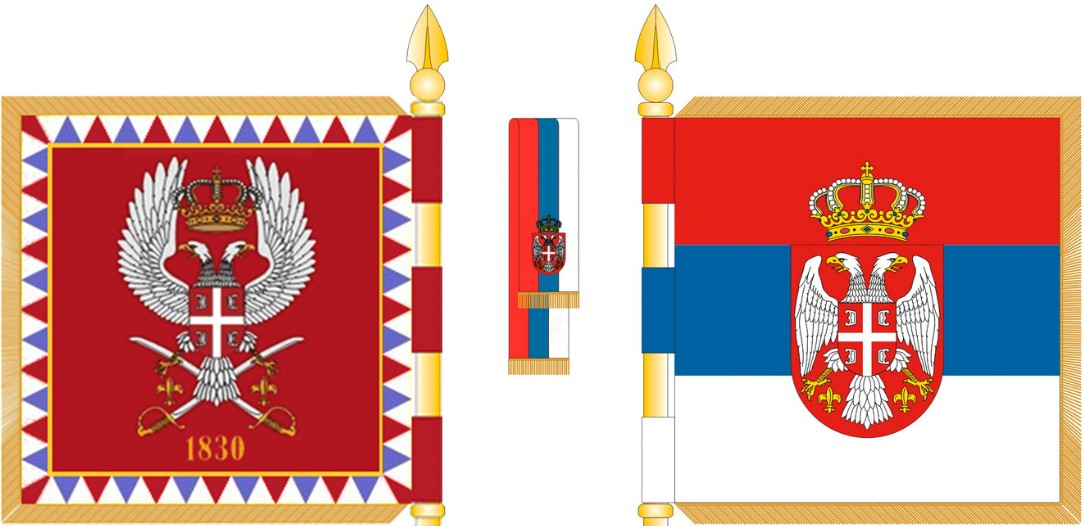
- Flag

The Guard of the Serbian Armed Forces (Serbian: Гарда Војске Србије, romanized: Garda Vojske Srbije) is an honour guard unit of the Serbian Armed Forces under the direct command of the General Staff. Besides ceremonial duties its main tasks include security and logistics missions.

== History ==
The Royal Guard was formed on 6 May 1830, as part of the Armed Forces of the Principality of Serbia, by the order of Prince Miloš Obrenović. It originated with 73 people selected for service in the Guard. On 12 May 1838, the Guard gained legal status from a special decree of Prince Miloš. In 1883, the Guard was transformed into the Royal Guard. The Royal Guard was considered to be an elite unit of the Royal Serbian Army and only the best conscripts were chosen to serve in its ranks. In 1914 the Royal Guard numbered a few thousand men and took part in all major battles of the Balkans theatre of World War I (until the liberation in 1918).

The Royal Guard was commanded by Lieutenant Colonel Nikola Kalabić during World War II and saw service against both Axis powers, their collaborators and the Yugoslav Partisans. On the other side, at the end of the war, by the decision of the Josip Broz Tito on 1 November 1944, the Guards Brigade of the Supreme Headquarters of the People's Liberation Army and Partisan Detachments of Yugoslavia was formed on the basis of the royalist formation. It was bigger than the old formation, and was a motorized force at first. In May 1945, the Guards Brigade's band was raised, then composed of 77 musicians. The first military honor was given to British Field Marshal Harold Alexander, Commander of the Allied Force Headquarters for the Mediterranean. The following year, in 1946, the Guards Brigade grew into the rank of a division, and in March 1948, the Guards Division formed the Yugoslav People's Army Guard Command, which was in the rank of an army district. Later, it was reconfigured to brigade status and renamed to the 1st Guards Mechanised Brigade.

During the breakup of Yugoslavia in 1991, the 1st Guards Mechanised Brigade took part in the Battle of Vukovar, where it acted as the Yugoslav People's Army's strike force from the southern flank. The Guards Brigade would serve the Armed Forces of Serbia and Montenegro with distinction for 14 years.

The Guard in its current form was formed on 30 November 2006 when the Serbian Armed Forces was created.

== Missions ==
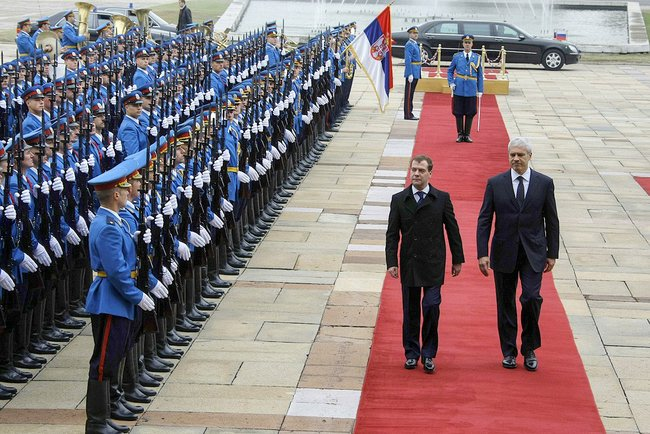
Guardsmen performing arrival ceremony for Dmitry Medvedev and Boris Tadić, 2010

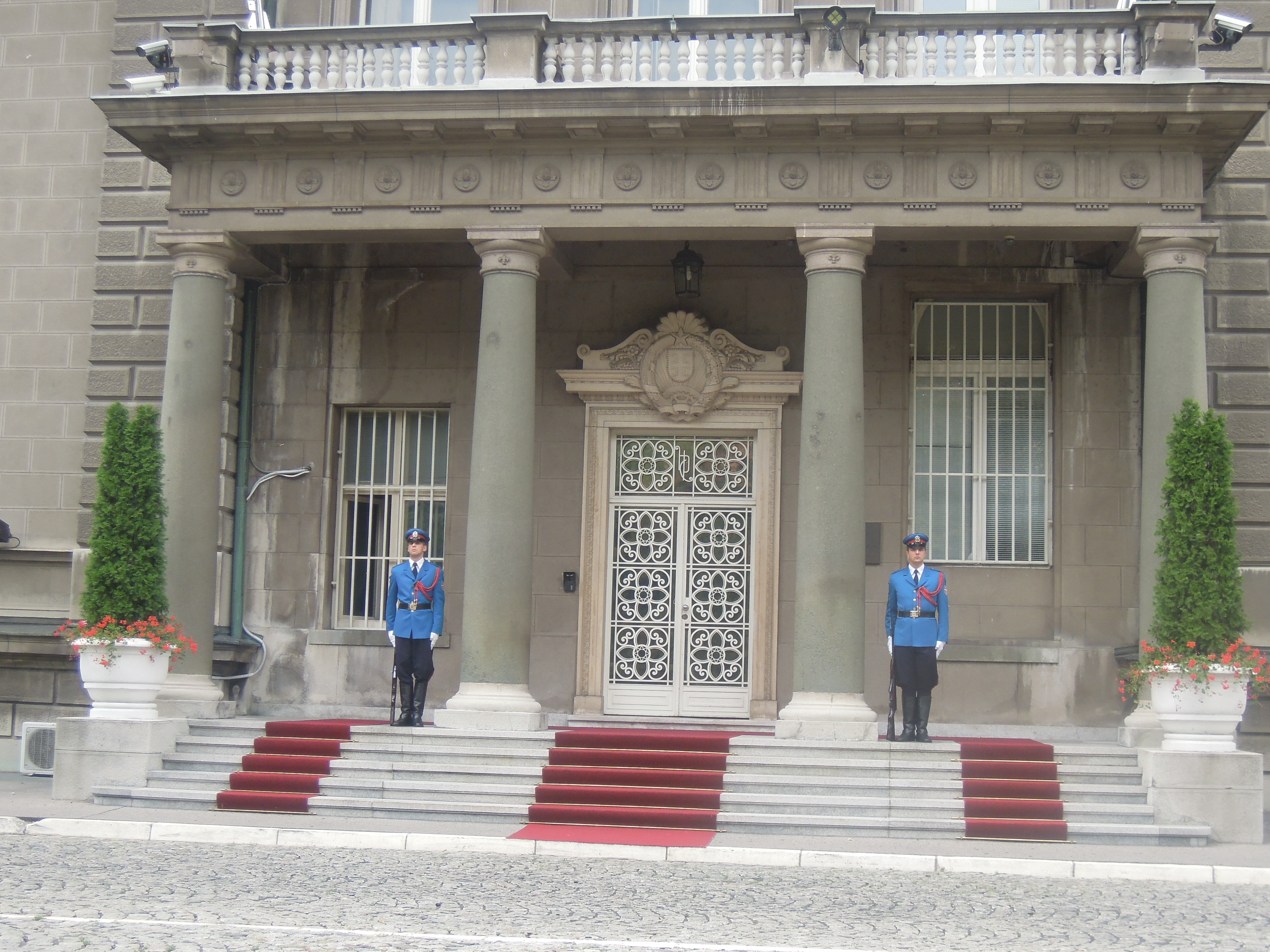
Guardsmen at Novi Dvor, the seat of the President of the Republic

The Guard is responsible for providing guards of honour at official ceremonies and for special security duties in Belgrade. It also performs tasks within the scope of the military police work and the tasks in the field of logistics.

=== Ceremonial duties ===
Ceremonial duties include performing military honours to the highest foreign, domestic, and military officials, such as arrival ceremonies at the Palace of Serbia and guard duty at Novi Dvor (the seat of the President of the Republic).

=== Security missions ===
Although the ceremonial duties attract more public attention, majority of the missions assigned to the Guard are security missions. These include guarding and protection of buildings and residences of chief military authorities: the Novi dvor (the seat of the Commander-in-Chief i.e. President of Serbia), buildings of the Ministry of Defence and the General Staff as well as the official residences of the President of the Republic, Minister of Defence and the Chief of the General Staff.

The close physical protection of the President of the Republic, Minister of Defence and the Chief of the General Staff is entrusted to the "Cobras", the unit that is not part of the Guard.

=== Logistics missions ===
The Guard provide logistics for the General Staff and the Ministry of Defence.

== Structure ==
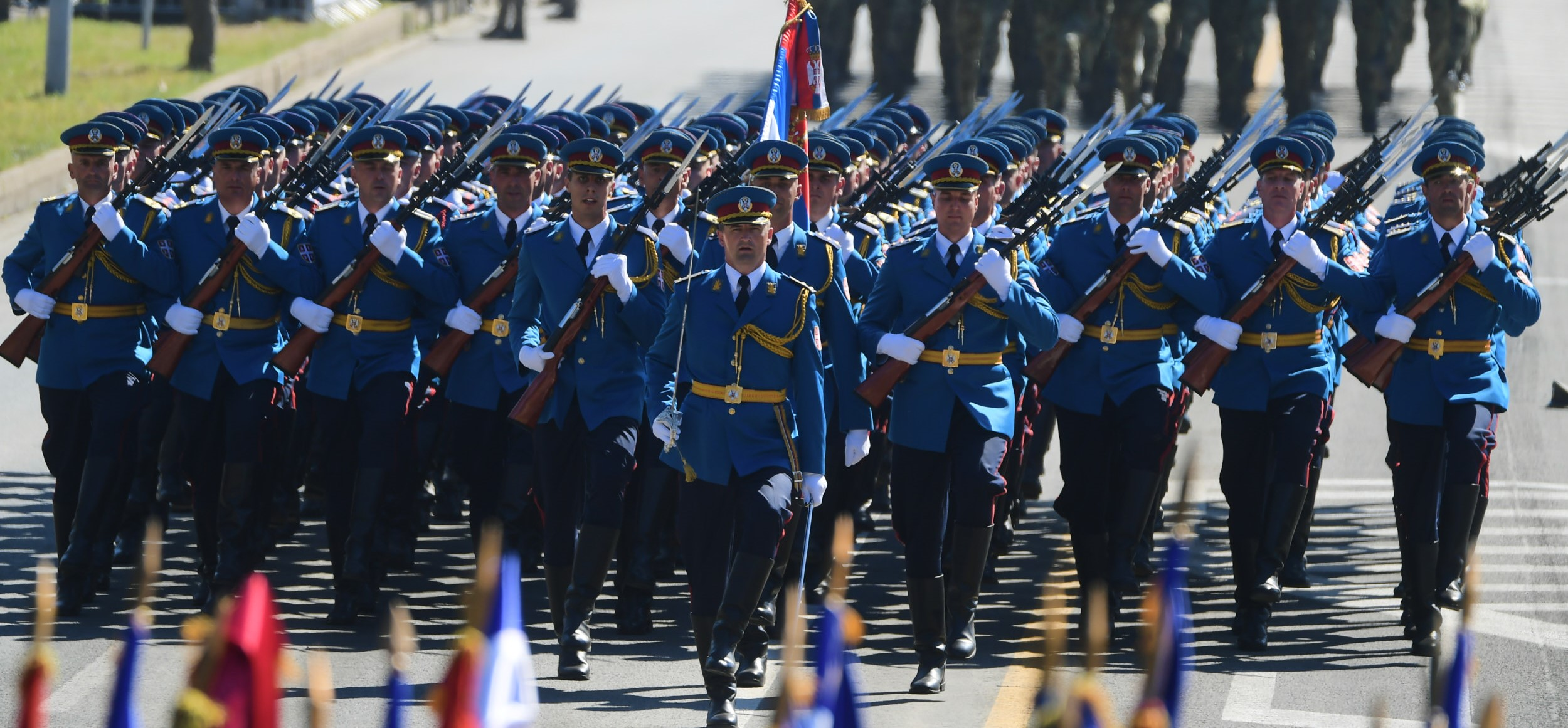
Honor Guard Battalion

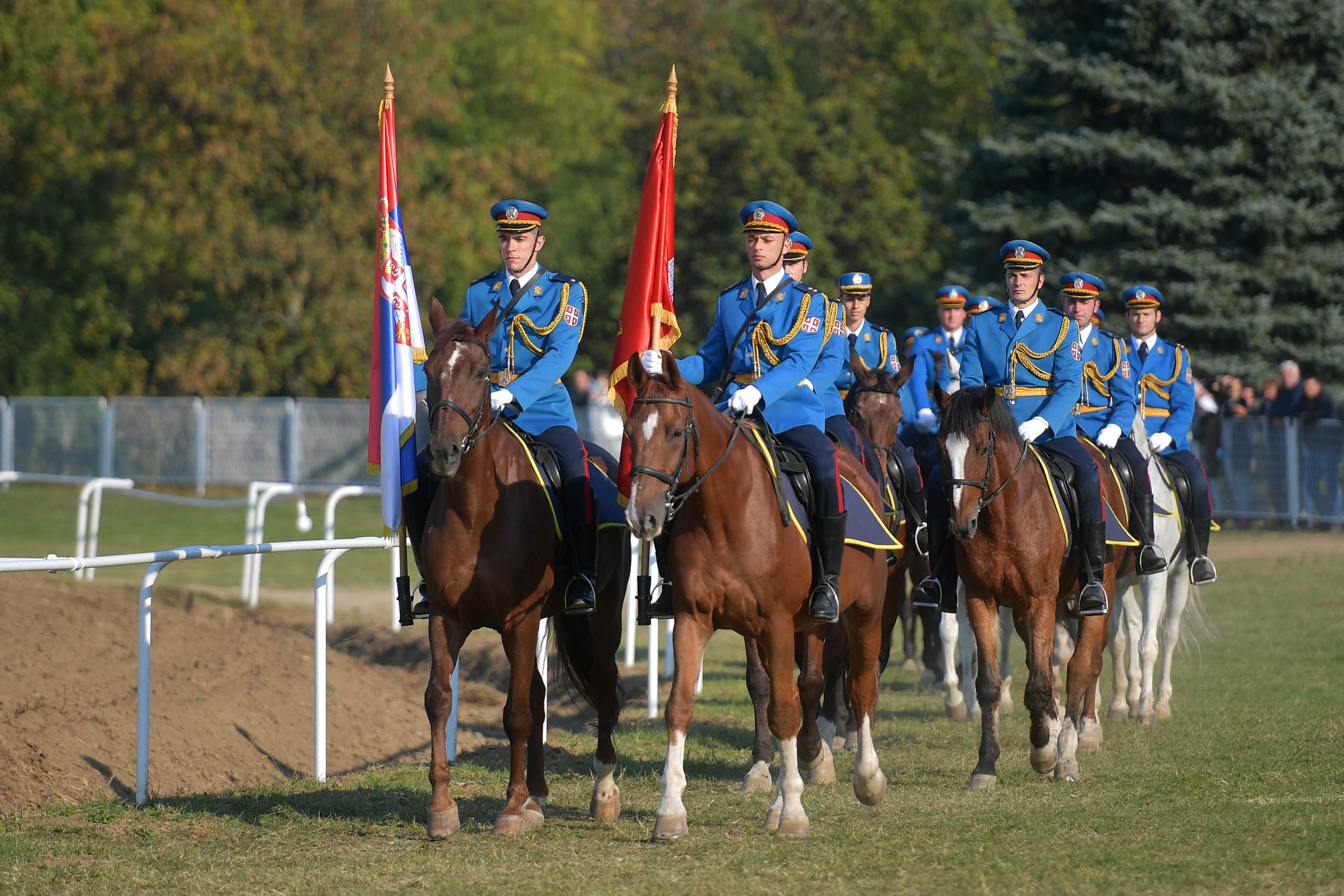
Cavalry Platoon

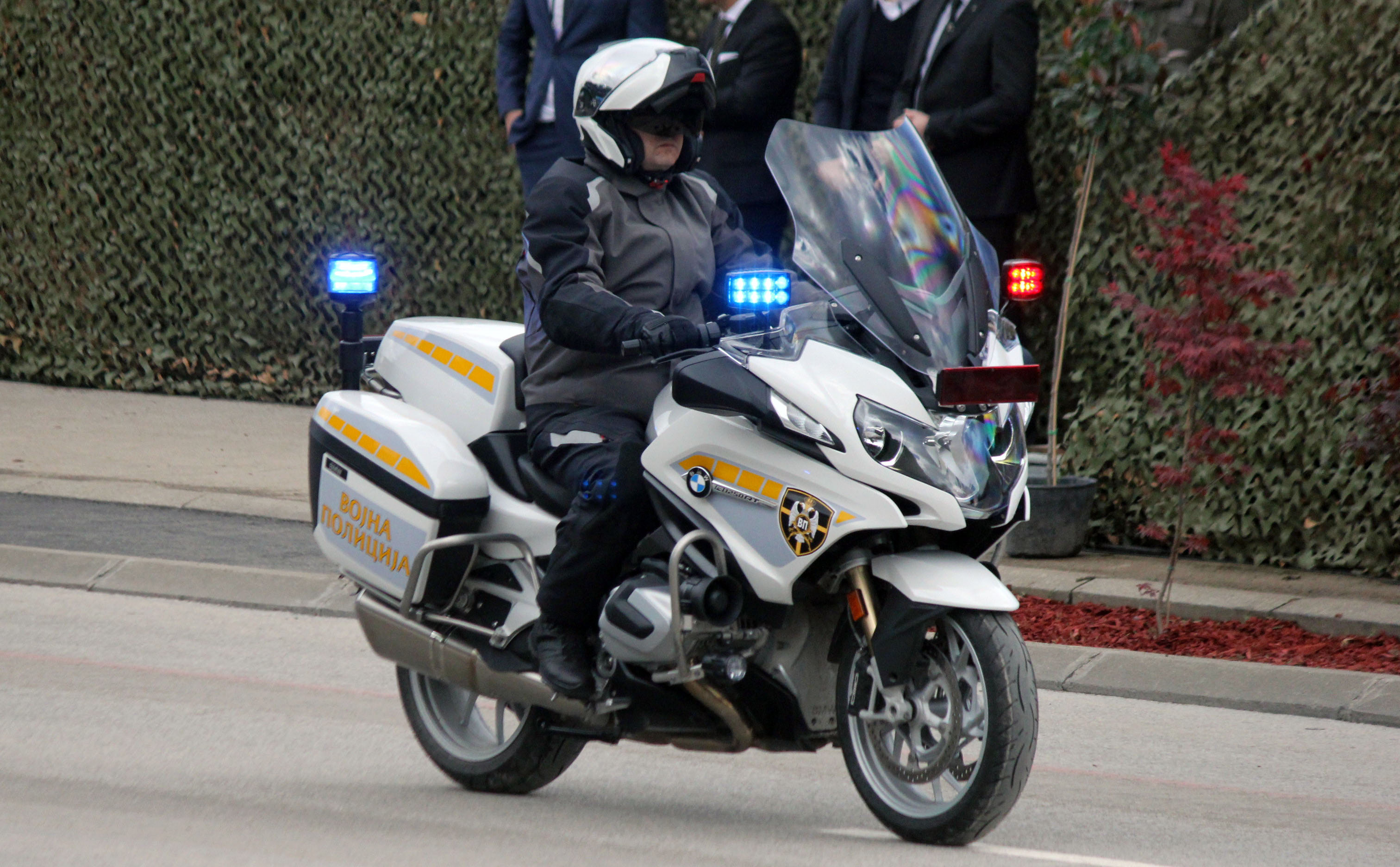
Motorcyclist of the 25th Military Police Battalion

The unit is composed of four battalions, all of which are based in the capital of Belgrade.

- Guards HQ
- Command Battalion
- Honor Guard Battalion
  - Band of the Guard of the Serbian Armed Forces
  - Cavalry Platoon
  - Gun salute Platoon
- 25th Military Police Battalion
- Logistics Battalion

=== Honor Guard Battalion ===
Honor Guard Battalion is tasked with performing ceremonial functions. The ceremonial standard rifle of the unit is Zastava M59/66. Battalion members took part both in the 2015 and 2020 Moscow Victory Day Parades. Part of the battalion is the Band of the Guard of the Serbian Armed Forces, the representative fanfare band of the unit and the Serbian Armed Forces in general, as well as the Cavalry Platoon, the mounted unit of the Guard and the only mounted unit of the Serbian Armed Forces, stationed in Karađorđevo estate.

=== 25th Military Police Battalion ===
The 25th Military Police Battalion is the military police unit of the Guard. It comprises the motorcycle unit which provides escort riding, personal escort, regulation and control of military traffic.

== Traditions ==
=== Anniversary ===
The anniversary of the unit is celebrated on May 6, in memory of the day when the Guard was formed in 1830.

=== Patron saint ===
The unit's slava or its patron saint is Saint George known as Sveti Đorđe.

=== Colors ===
Royal blue and black with red trim are the colors used in the full dress uniform uniforms, worn by the Guardsmen since 1954, a recognizable symbol of the unit among general public in Serbia.

=== March Music ===
The Guard uses its own Guard March (Gardijski marš) as standard march music.

=== Decorations ===
- Order of the National Hero (1958)
- Order of the War Banner (2000)
- Order of the White Eagle with the swords (2015)

== Gallery ==
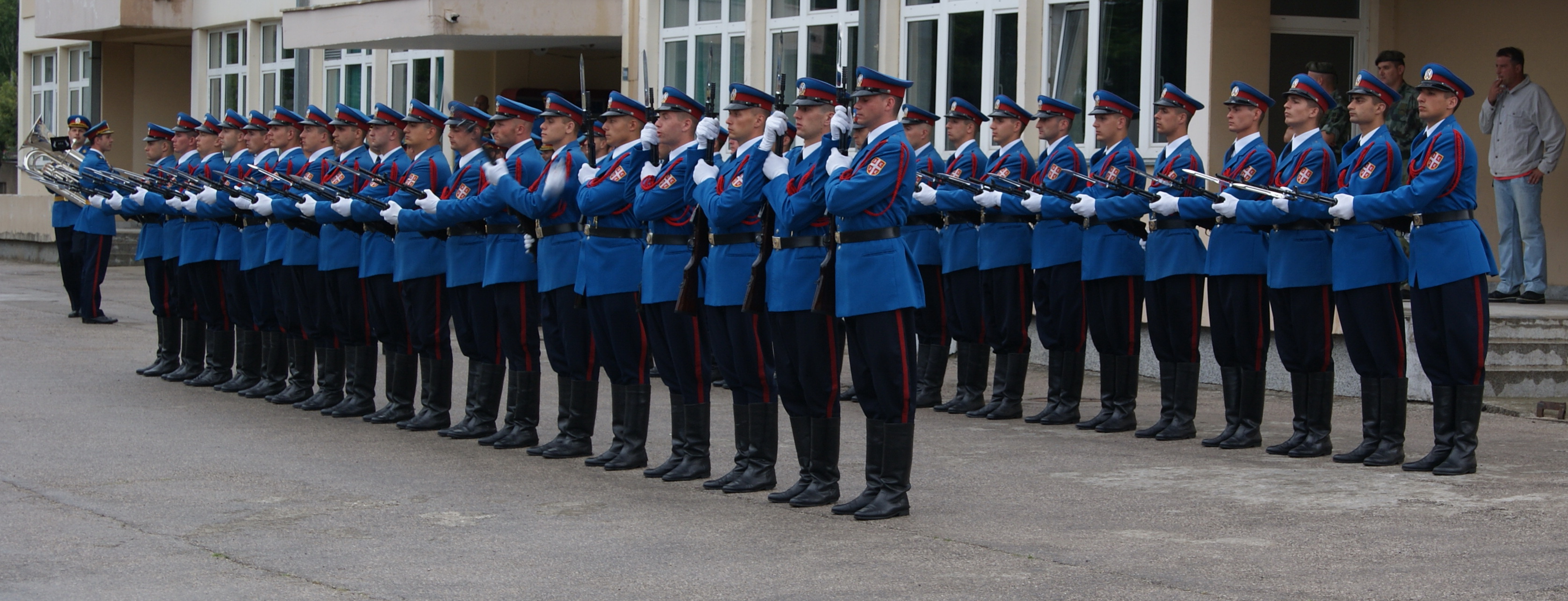
Drill platoon

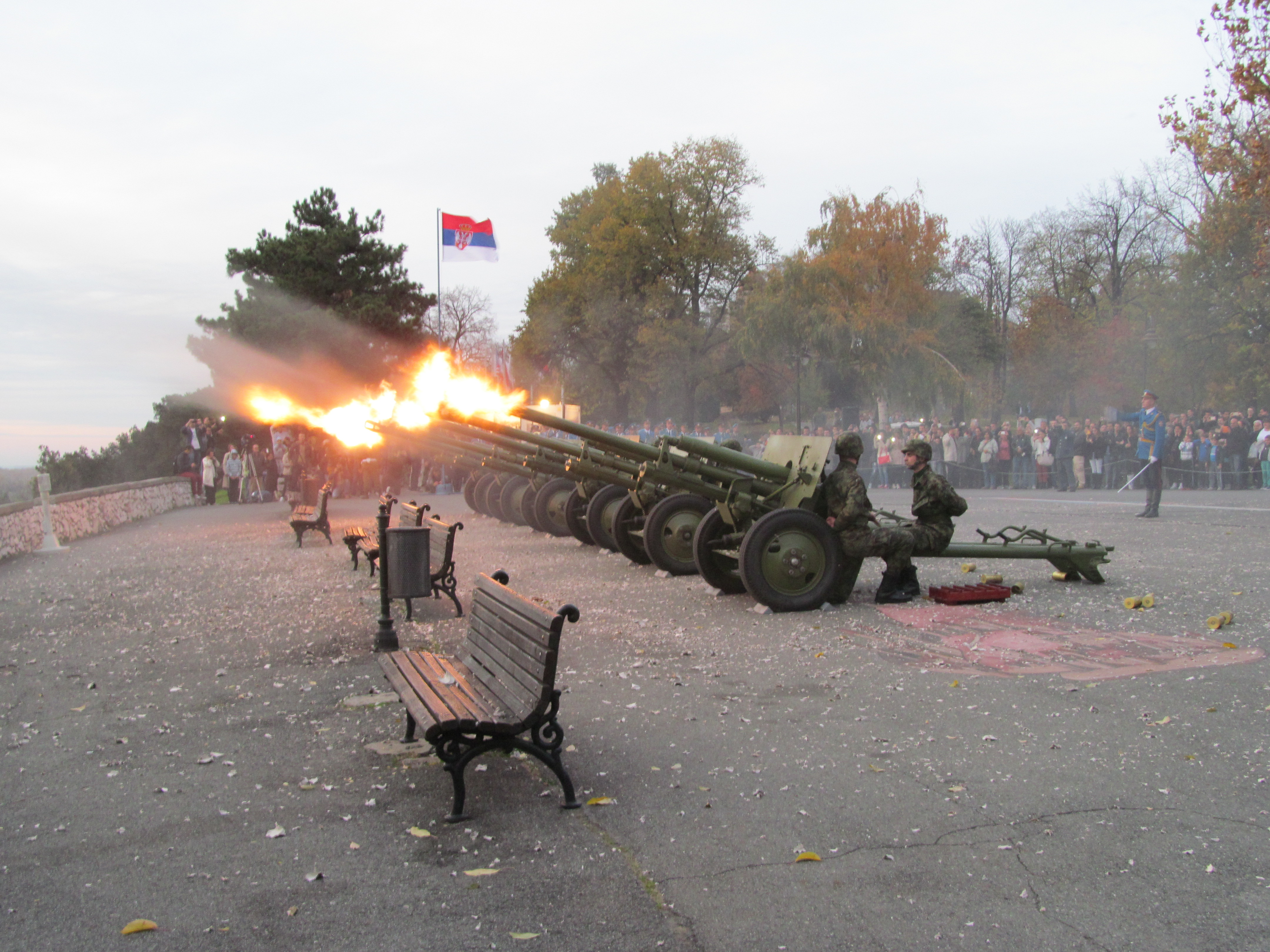
Gun salute platoon
