= Leskovac (Lazarevac) =

Coordinates: 44.5242°N 20.3272°E

Leskovac Лесковац
- Village
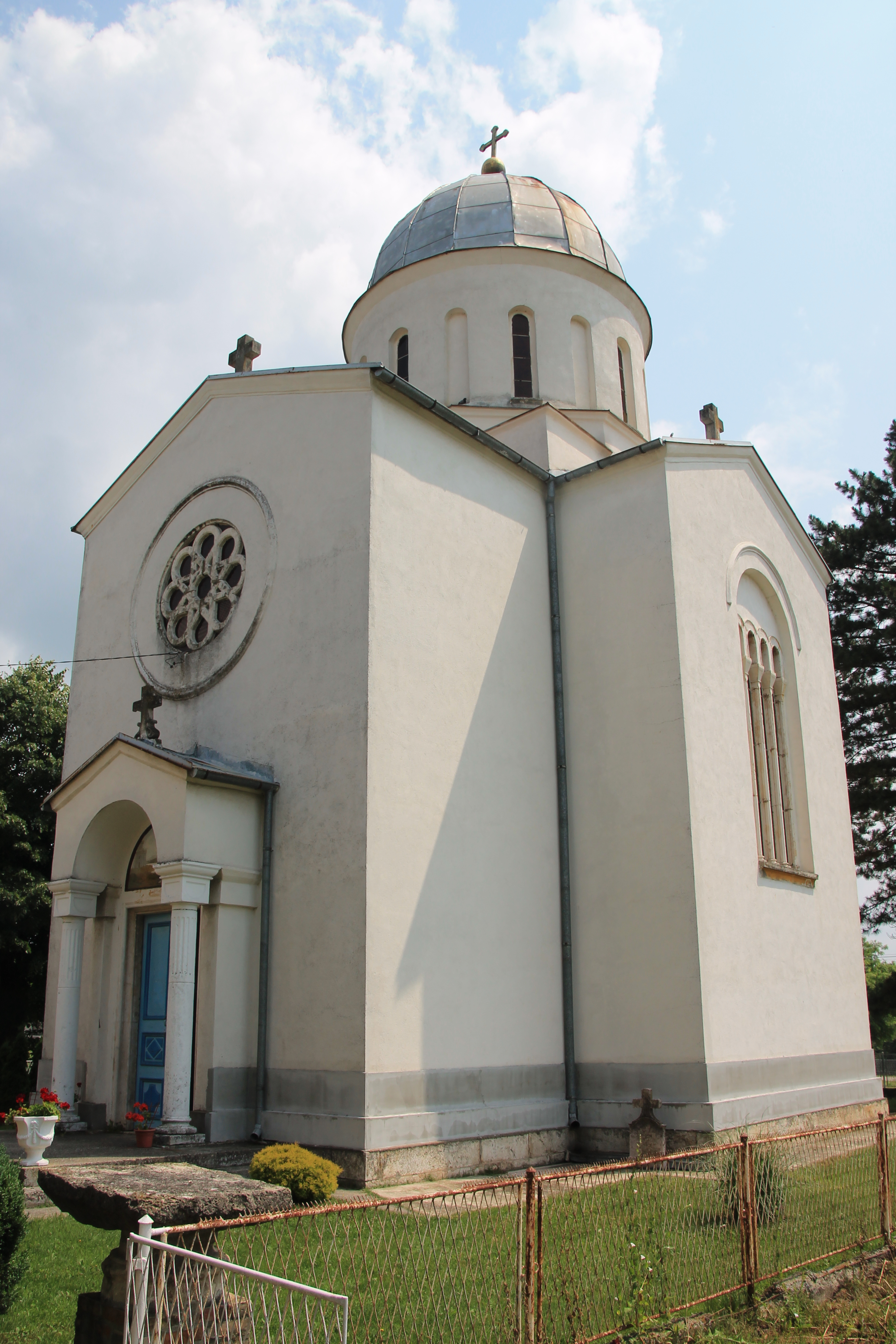
- Crkva Sv. Dimitrija (Leskovac)
- Interactive map of Leskovac
- Country: Serbia
- Municipality: Lazarevac

Area
  - Total: 10.81 km^{2} (4.17 sq mi)
- Elevation: 109 m (358 ft)

Population (2011)
  - Total: 779
  - Density: 72.1/km^{2} (187/sq mi)
- Time zone: UTC+1 (CET)
  - Summer (DST): UTC+2 (CEST)

Leskovac (Serbian Cyrillic: Лесковац) is a suburban settlement of Belgrade, the capital of Serbia. It is located in the municipality of Lazarevac.

The village is located between the surface mines of the Kolubara mining basin. It is known for the Magic Garden, an artistic colony of the naïve sculptors, established by the world renown Serbian sculptor Bogosav Živković, himself a native of Leskovac.
