= Mercator Serbia =

Serbian supermarket chain

- Official logo
- Native name: Меркатор Србија
- Company type: d.o.o.
- Industry: Retail
- Founded: 2002; 24 years ago (Current form); 5 February 1993; 33 years ago (Founded)
- Headquarters: Temerinski put 50, Novi Sad, Serbia
- Number of locations: 321 retail stores (as of 2018)
- Area served: Serbia
- Key people: Entoni Sošić (Director)
- Brands: Mercator; Idea; Roda
- Services: Discount stores, hypermarket, supercenter, supermarket, superstore, other specialty
- Revenue: ▼€711.34 million (2018)
- Net income: ▼ (€14.06 million) (2018)
- Total assets: ▼€457.47 million (2018)
- Total equity: ▼€101.32 million (2018)
- Owner: Mercator (100%)
- Number of employees: 8,124 (2018)
- Website: www.mercator.rs
- Footnotes / references Business ID: 06886671; Tax ID: 101670560

Mercator Serbia (Serbian: Меркатор Србија, romanized: Merkator Srbija) also known as Mercator-S, is a Serbian supermarket chain and a part of Mercator Group, an international retail chain based in Slovenia. As of 2016, it holds a 15.98% market share in Serbia.

== History ==
The company was established in 2002 when the first Mercator Center Belgrade was opened in New Belgrade. The 50,000 square meter Center underwent a complete renovation and was re-opened in 2012.

In October 2006, Mercator acquired 76% of Rodić M&B company for 116 million euros, becoming the major shareholder in Roda Supermarkets. The full ownership takeover of this company was completed in 2009.

In June 2013, the Croatian Agrokor Group initiated the takeover of Mercator Group, which was completed in June 2014. They then began integrating their operations in Serbia under the Mercator brand, which included Mercator Centers, Roda Megamarkets, and Idea supermarkets. The takeover was approved by the Serbian Commission for the Protection of Competition in December 2013.

In December 2017, the Serbian holding company MPC Holding purchased Mercator Center Belgrade from Mercator Serbia for a sum of 46 million euros. As of December 31, 2018, Mercator operates 321 retail stores in Serbia, including 241 Idea markets, 35 Idea supermarkets, 30 Roda markets, 6 Roda megamarkets, and two Mercator hypermarkets.

In August 2019, the Mercator Group initiated the process of selling an additional 12 supermarkets across the former Yugoslavia region in order to reduce debts. Among the listed markets for sale, two of them are owned by Mercator Serbia.

=== Allegations of price fixing ===
On October 10, the Commission for Protection of Competition launched an investigation against Delhaize Serbia, Mercator S, Univerexport, and DIS for violating competition in the market by entering into a restrictive agreement, specifically by agreeing on identical prices for certain products.

The Commission monitored price movements for 35 selected products from late April 2024 to September 19, 2024 in these four retail chains. The prices were found to be virtually identical or very similar across different retailers, including during promotional periods.

Belgrade Higher Public Prosecutor’s Office formed a case on 15 October 2024 after receiving Commission’s report and issued requests to the Market Inspection Sector of the Ministry of Internal and Foreign Trade for data spanning 2016-2024 regarding pricing, supply chains, and anti-competitive behaviour.

== Gallery ==
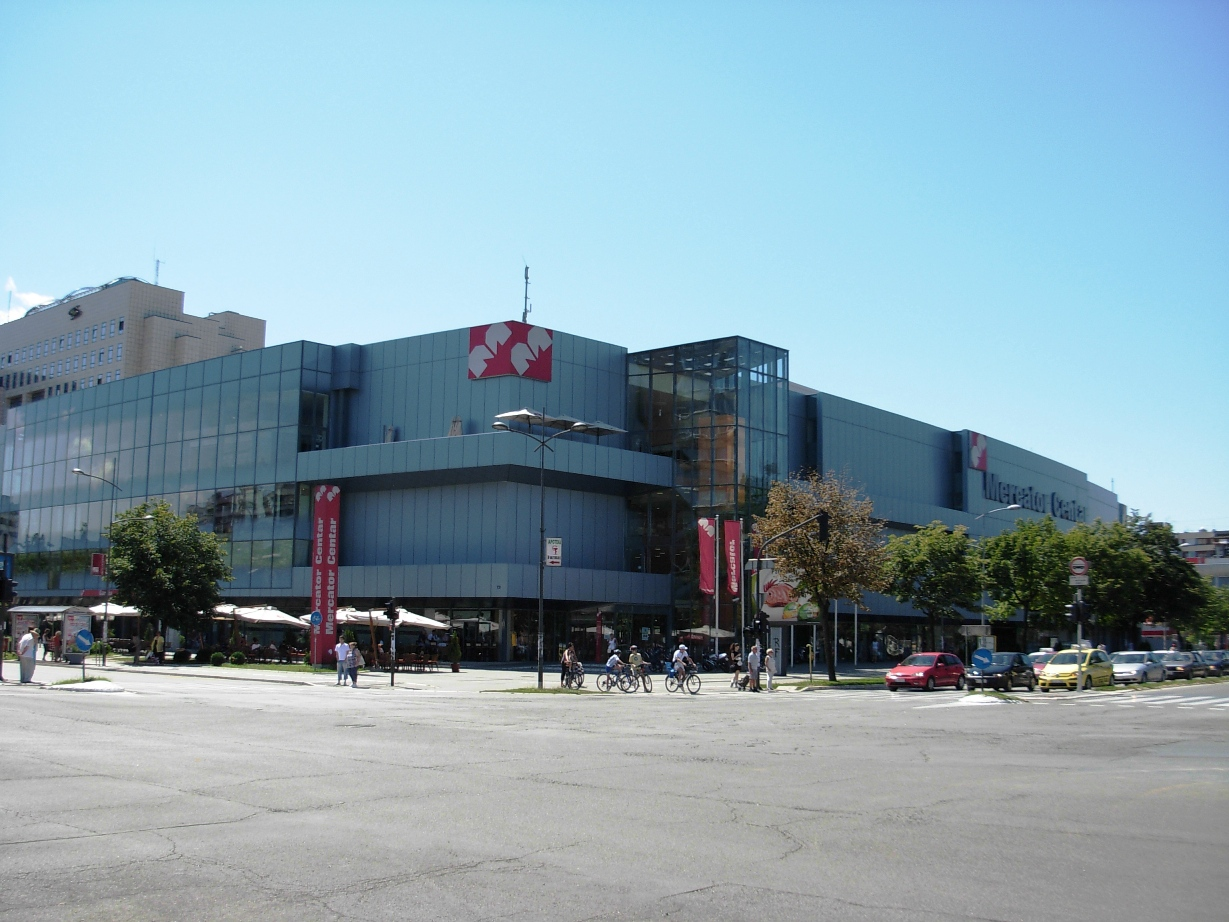
Mercator Center in Novi Sad

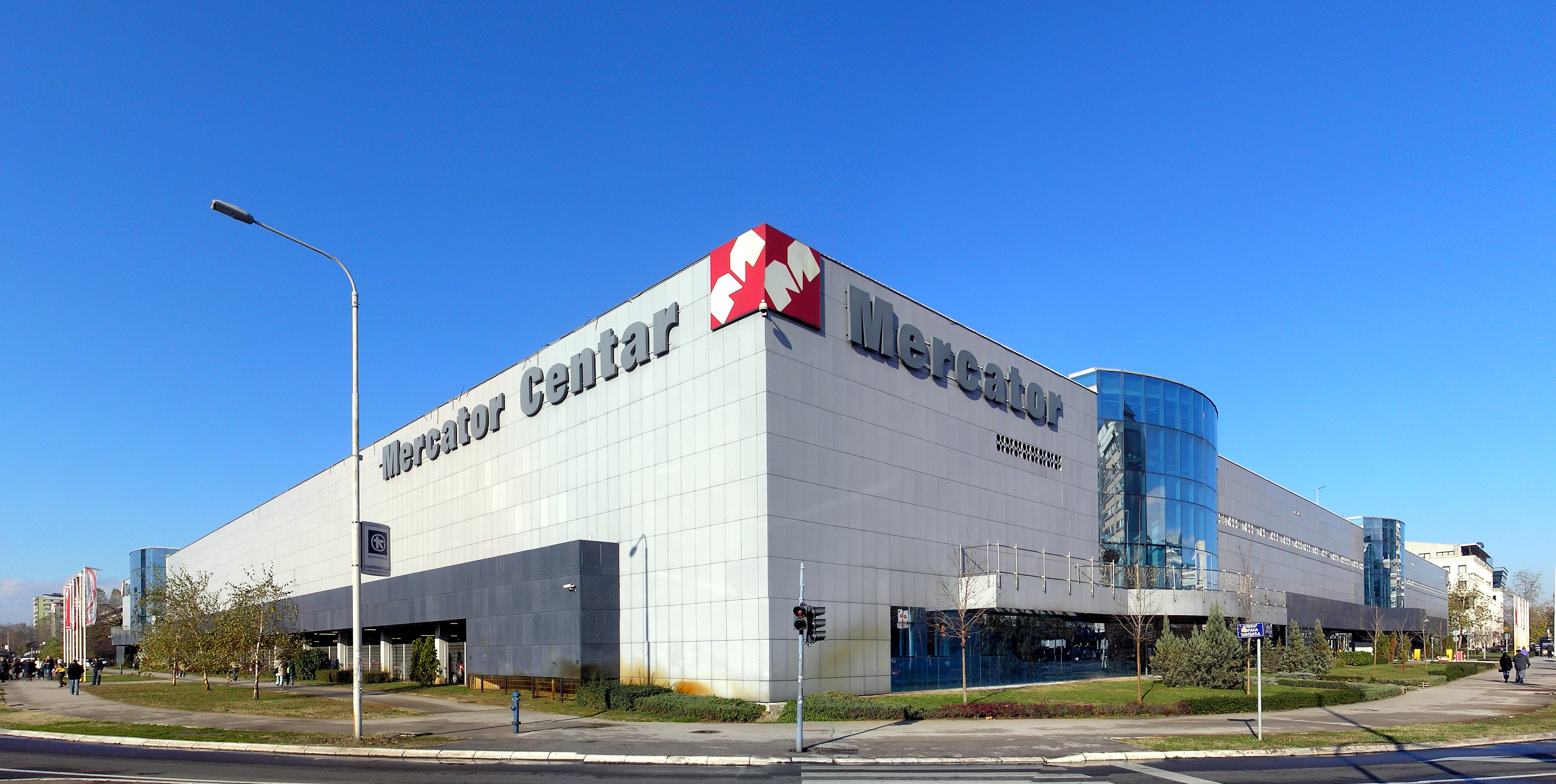
Mercator Center Belgrade in New Belgrade

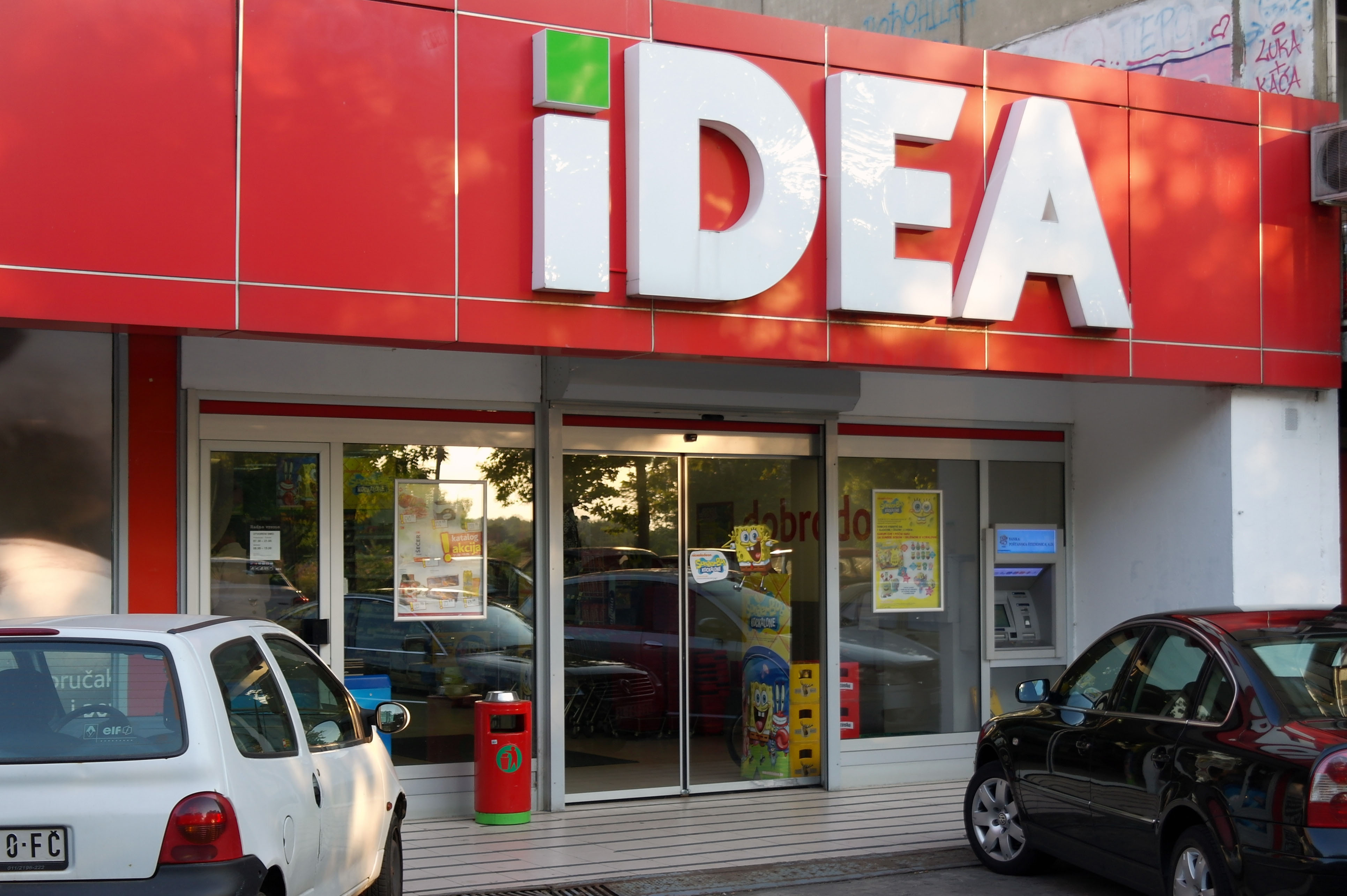
Idea supermarket in New Belgrade

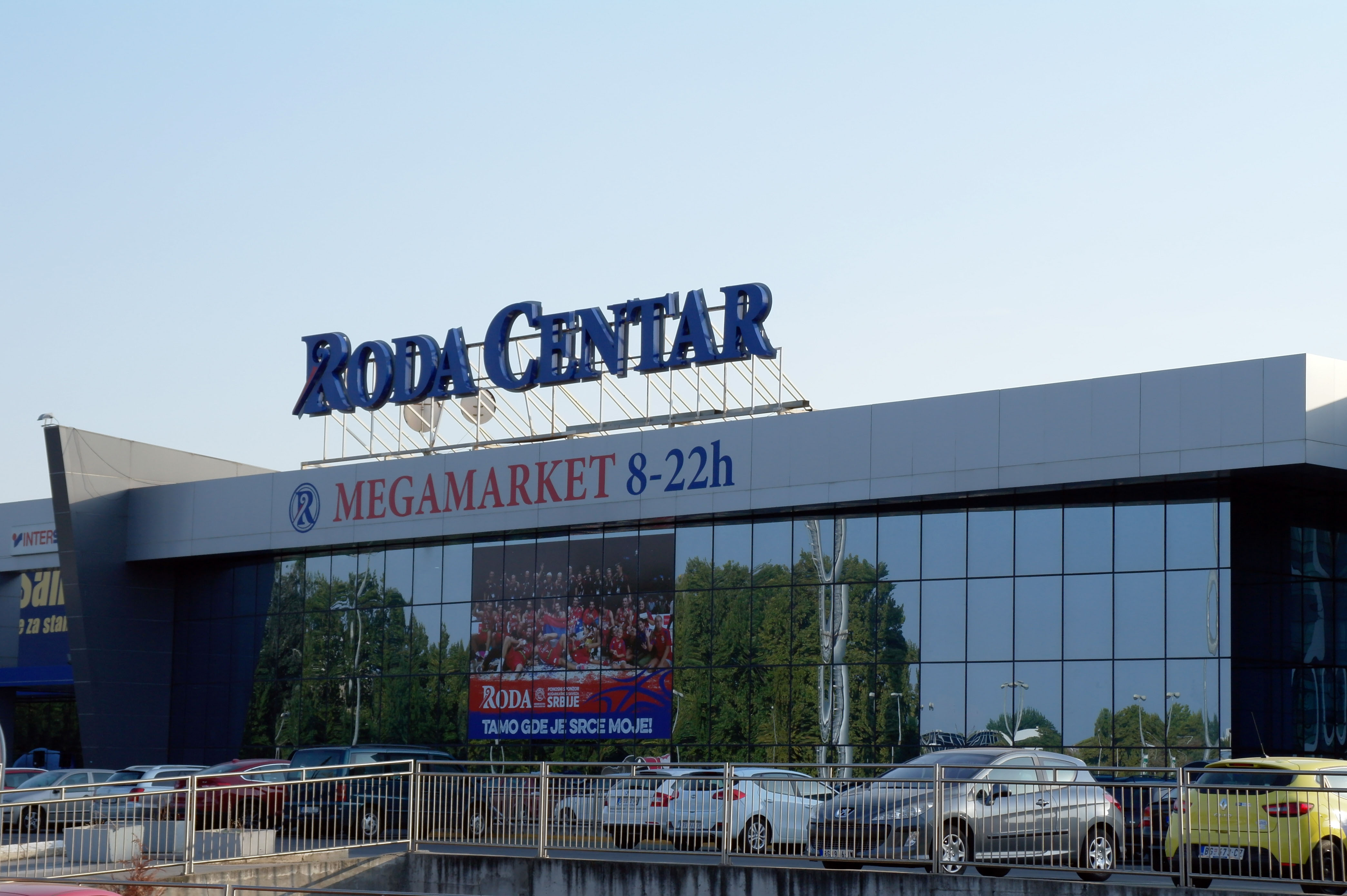
Roda Center in New Belgrade

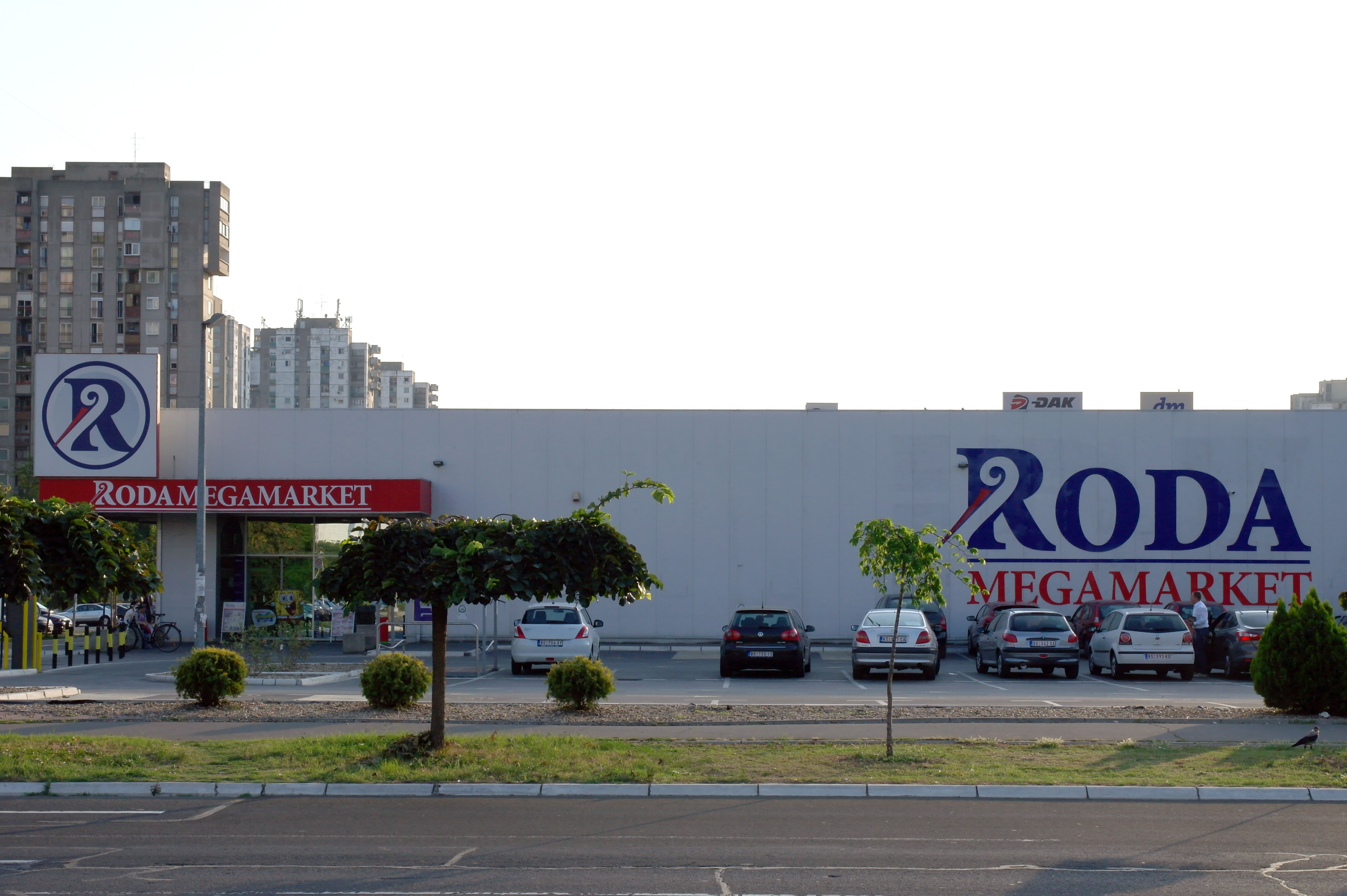
Roda megamarket in New Belgrade

== See also ==
- List of supermarket chains in Serbia
