= MPC Holding =

Serbian holding company

- Official logo]
- Native name: МПЦ Холдинг
- Type: d.o.o.
- Industry: Holding
- Founded: 24 October 1991; 34 years ago
- Headquarters: Bulevar Mihajla Pupina 6, Belgrade, Serbia
- Area served: Serbia
- Key people: Predrag Radlovački (Director); Petar Matić (Founder and owner)
- Revenue: ▲€317.56 million (2018)
- Net income: ▼€0.14 million (2018)
- Total assets: ▼€64.62 million (2018)
- Total equity: ▼€20.62 million (2018)
- Owner: Centuirion Venture Capital B.V. (80%); Petar Matić (20%)
- Number of employees: 508 (2018)
- Website: www.mpcholding.com
- Footnotes; Business ID: 07764855; Tax ID: 100002250

MPC Holding (Serbian Cyrillic: МПЦ Холдинг) is a Serbian holding company with the headquarters in Belgrade, Serbia.

== History ==
MPC Holding was established on 24 November 1991 by the Serbian businessman Petar Matić.

In 2002, MPC Holding bought and renovated at the time 105-meter tall Ušće Tower at New Belgrade, which was partially damaged during the NATO bombing of Yugoslavia. The skyscraper was used as the headquarters of Central Committee of the League of Communists of Yugoslavia from 1964 until 1990. In 2009, Ušće Shopping Center worth 150 million euros and spanning over 130,000 square meters was opened close to the Ušće Tower.

In March 2008, MPC Holding bought Sarajevo-based Holiday Inn Hotel.

In March 2016, Dutch based "Atterbury Europe" investment group acquired one-third of ownership shares of MPC Holding.

In December 2017, MPC Holding bought Mercator Center Belgrade from the Mercator Serbia for a sum of 46 million euros. In January 2018, MPC Holding announced that it started building the second skyscraper next to the Ušće Tower, and when finished it will be 103.9 meters high. It was opened on 11 June 2020. Also, in the summer of 2020, the company opened BEO Shopping Center and Navigator Business Center 2, all located in Belgrade.

In December 2021, MPC Properties acquired Delta City Belgrade from South African investment fund Hyprop Investments.

== Subsidiaries ==
- Mercata d.o.o. Belgrade
- Plaza prima d.o.o. Belgrade
- MPC Air d.o.o. Belgrade
- Airfield d.o.o. Belgrade
