= Royal Guard (Serbia) =

Former military unit (1830–1943)

- Краљева гарда Kraljeva garda
- Flag of the Royal Guard. However, the dimensions of this flag vary from the original flags. The text above says "For Faith, King and Fatherland", written with Serbian pronunciation but with Church Slavonic letters.
- Active: 1830–1943
- Country: Principality of Serbia; Kingdom of Serbia; Kingdom of Yugoslavia
- Allegiance: Prince of Serbia; King of Serbia; King of Yugoslavia
- Branch: Army of the Principality of Serbia; Royal Serbian Army; Royal Yugoslav Army
- Type: Life guard Elite forces
- Role: Protection of members of the royal family
- Garrison/HQ: Kragujevac; Topčider, Belgrade
- Patron: Saint George
- Mottos: For Faith, King and Fatherland (За веру, краља и отачаство / Za veru, kralja i otačastvo)
- Anniversaries: 6 May (Saint George's Day)
- Engagements: Serbian–Ottoman Wars (1876–1878); Russo-Turkish War (1877–1878); Balkan Wars; World War I; Balkans theatre; World War II; Invasion of Yugoslavia

Commanders
- Notable commanders: Toma Vučić Perišić; Nikola Kalabić

The Royal Guard (Serbian Cyrillic: Краљева гарда, romanized: Kraljeva garda) was a life guard and elite unit of the Armed Forces of the Principality of Serbia, the Royal Serbian Army and the Royal Yugoslav Army that existed from 1830 to 1943.

Its task was to protect members of the royal family (the House of Obrenović or the House of Karađorđević). The unit had Saint George as its patron.

The unit was the predecessor of the Royal Mountain Guard, which existed from 1943 to 1945 and belonged to the Yugoslav Army in the Homeland (the Chetniks).

== History ==
=== Principality of Serbia ===
The Royal Guard was founded in 1830 on the initiative of Prince Miloš Obrenović.

He ordered that young men be selected "from the cooperative and wealthier households, in accordance with their status and reputation", and distinguished them from "common soldiers". He established clear requirements for those eligible for recruitment: they had to be healthy, unmarried, and well-behaved young men, free from misconduct or vices. Furthermore, if possible, they were to be literate. The Prince also addressed the parents of the prospective guardsmen, stating: "Every father or relative should hold in high regard the individual whose son or kinsman is admitted into the Guard".

The creation of the Guard was legalized on 12 May 1838 by Prince Miloš passing a decree.

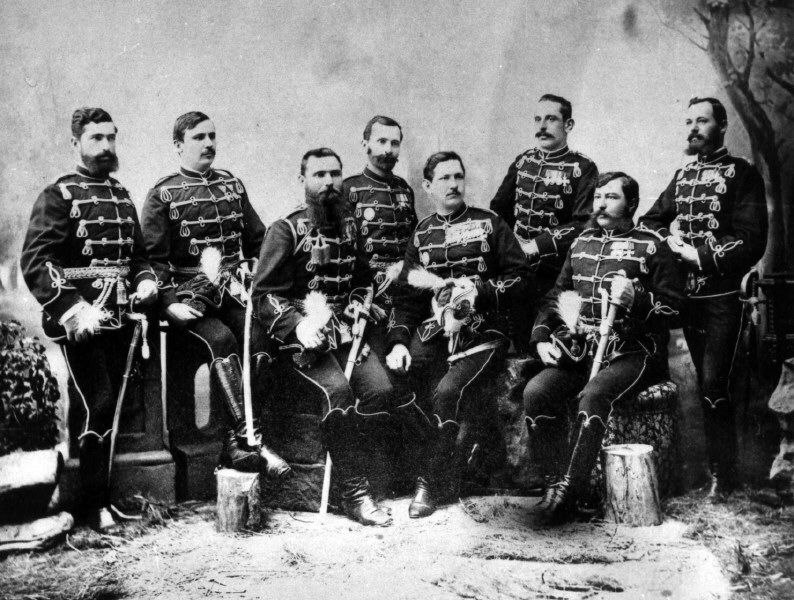
Officers of the Royal Guard (1887).

On Saint George's Day 1830, 73 young men were selected in Požarevac, from which the first guard company was formed. They were all enrolled in the Guards School, where they were taught to read and write and undergo military training.

After a second guard company was formed, the guard was merged with the guard division headed by the "Colonel Military Serdar and Chief of the Princely Guard" Toma Vučić Perišić. The guard was then moved to Kragujevac, the capital of the Principality of Serbia at the time.

In the spring of 1831, the orchestra "Prince-Serbian Orchestra" also joined the princely guard, led by Josif Šlezinger, who was sent to Kragujevac by Prince Miloš's brother Jevrem.

At Candlemas in 1835, in the Cathedral of the Dormition of the Mother of God in Kragujevac, the new Sretenje Constitution was solemnly proclaimed during a service. The honor of carrying the state flag then fell to Jevrem Gavrilović.

On 12 May 1838, the establishment of the Guard was legalized by a decree issued by Prince Miloš. At the same time, the Guard received an official military insignia for the first time. The date was then embroidered in gold thread on the tricolor band, at the top of the spear on the Guard's banner.

During his second reign (1858–1860), Prince Miloš decided to dress his guards in "dušanka", uniforms lavishly decorated after the Hungarian model but also in line with the dress customs prevailing in medieval Serbia.

=== Kingdom of Serbia ===
A postcard with the uniforms of the Royal Guard (1890).

On Palm Sunday 1886, a grand ceremony took place in the Kalemegdan Park in Belgrade, the capital of the Kingdom of Serbia. There, among other things, King Milan I Obrenović presented the new military flags to fifteen commanders of the infantry regiments and five commanders of the cavalry regiments. Later, the king said: "By handing over the flags to you today, I hand over to you the honor, I hand over to you the dignity and the future of Serbia".

The flag of the Royal Guard was decorated with gold thread with the inscription "For the Faith, the King and the Fatherland – Royal Guard".

The Royal Guard was a prominent symbol of the Royal Serbian Army at the coronation of King Peter I Karađorđević in September 1904. During the difficult days of World War I, the Guard became not only the king's closest protectors, but also his moral support and fighting inspiration.

When the Serbian army was forced to retreat towards Greece in late 1915, the Guard literally carried its aging king in its arms through Albania's steep ravines and impassable mountain ranges. Many of them never arrived.

During the victorious offensive on the Macedonian front in 1918 and the subsequent liberation of Serbia, many from the Guard gave their lives.

=== Kingdom of Yugoslavia ===
During World War II, the military of the Kingdom of Yugoslavia was unprepared and inadequately equipped to face the threat from the Axis powers. When Nazi Germany launched the invasion of Yugoslavia on 6 April 1941 (the "April War"), many of the non-Serb majority of the Royal Yugoslav Army fled or surrendered.

At the end of the April War, a large number and mostly Serb soldiers and officers were captured, who refused to surrender without a fight. The Royal Guard also suffered a similar fate. Some of the personnel who managed to avoid capture continued to resist and some of the officers joined the Yugoslav Army in the Homeland (the Chetniks), where the Royal Mountain Guard was formed.

== Gallery ==
Uniform of the Royal Guard from 1903 to 1941.

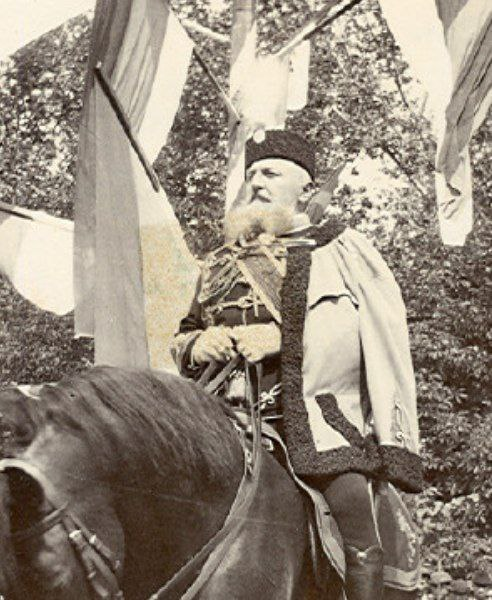
Aleksandar Konstantinović, Commander of the Royal Guard from 1892 to 1900.

Vojislav Blaznavac, Commander of the Royal Guard from 1901 to 1903.

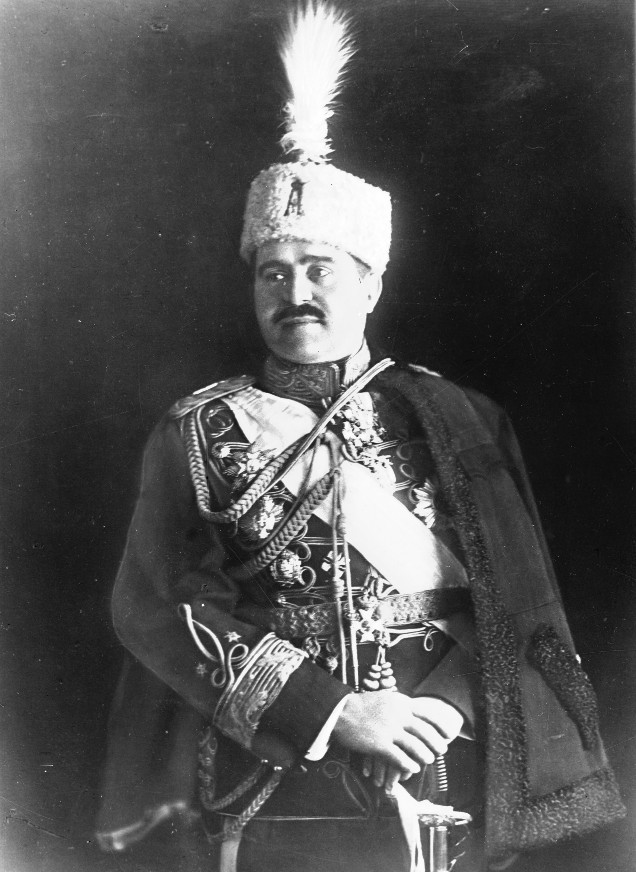
Officer Petar Živković wearing the uniform of the Royal Guard (1928).

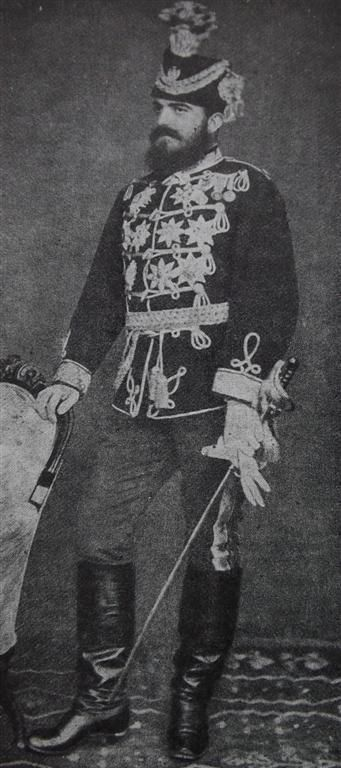
Prince Milan Obrenović IV wearing the uniform of the Royal Guard (1878).

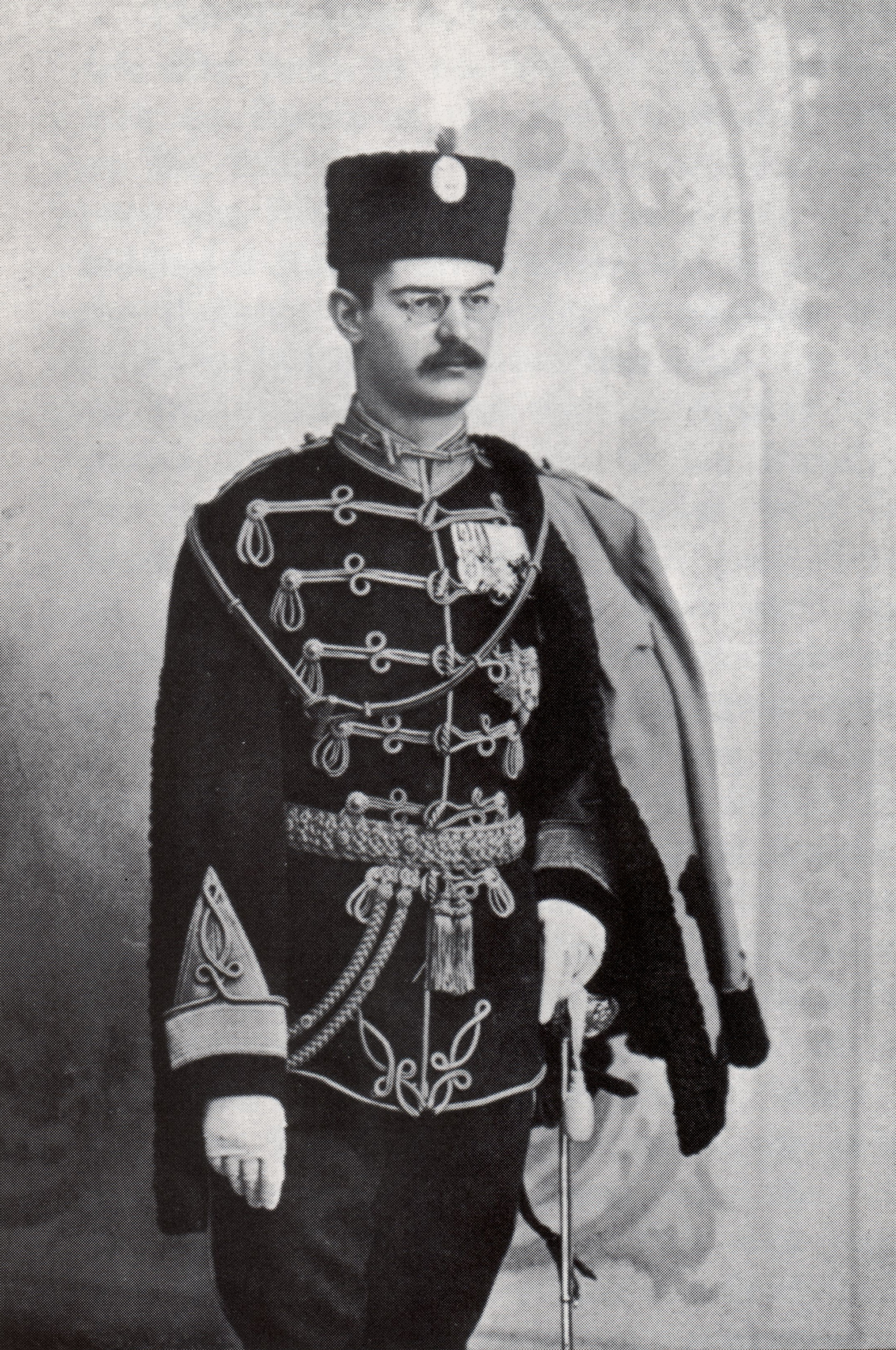
King Alexander I Obrenović wearing the uniform of the Royal Guard (1900).

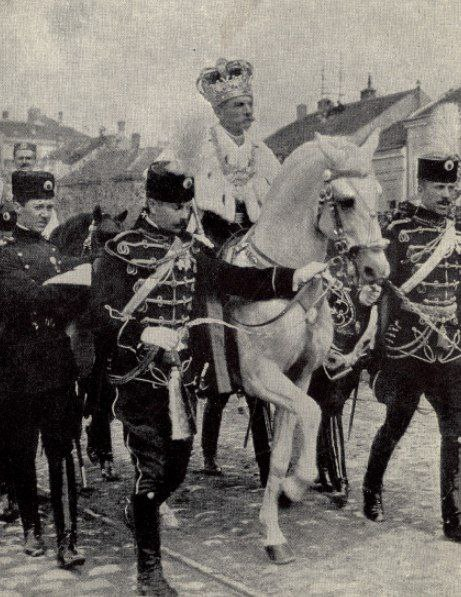
Guardsmen at the coronation of King Peter I Karađorđević (1904).

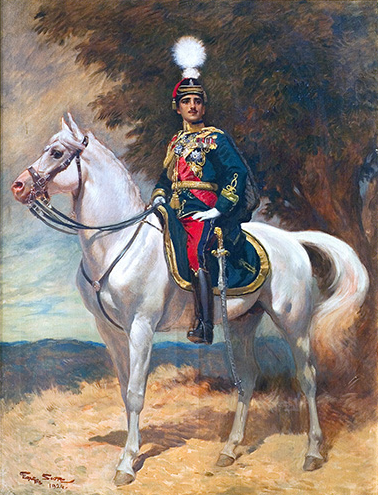
King Alexander I Karađorđević wearing the uniform of the Royal Guard (1924).

Officers of the Royal Guard march in Belgrade (1913).

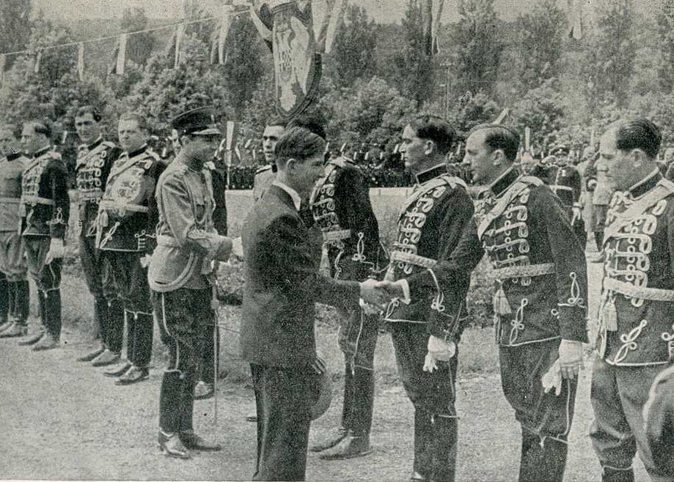
Prince Regent Paul Karađorđević and King Peter II Karađorđević with Guardsmen on Saint George's Day (c. 1940).

== See also ==
- Guard of the Serbian Armed Forces
- Military history of Serbia
