= Band of the Guard of the Serbian Armed Forces =

Official military band of the Serbian Armed Forces

- Репрезентативни оркестар Гарде Војске Србије
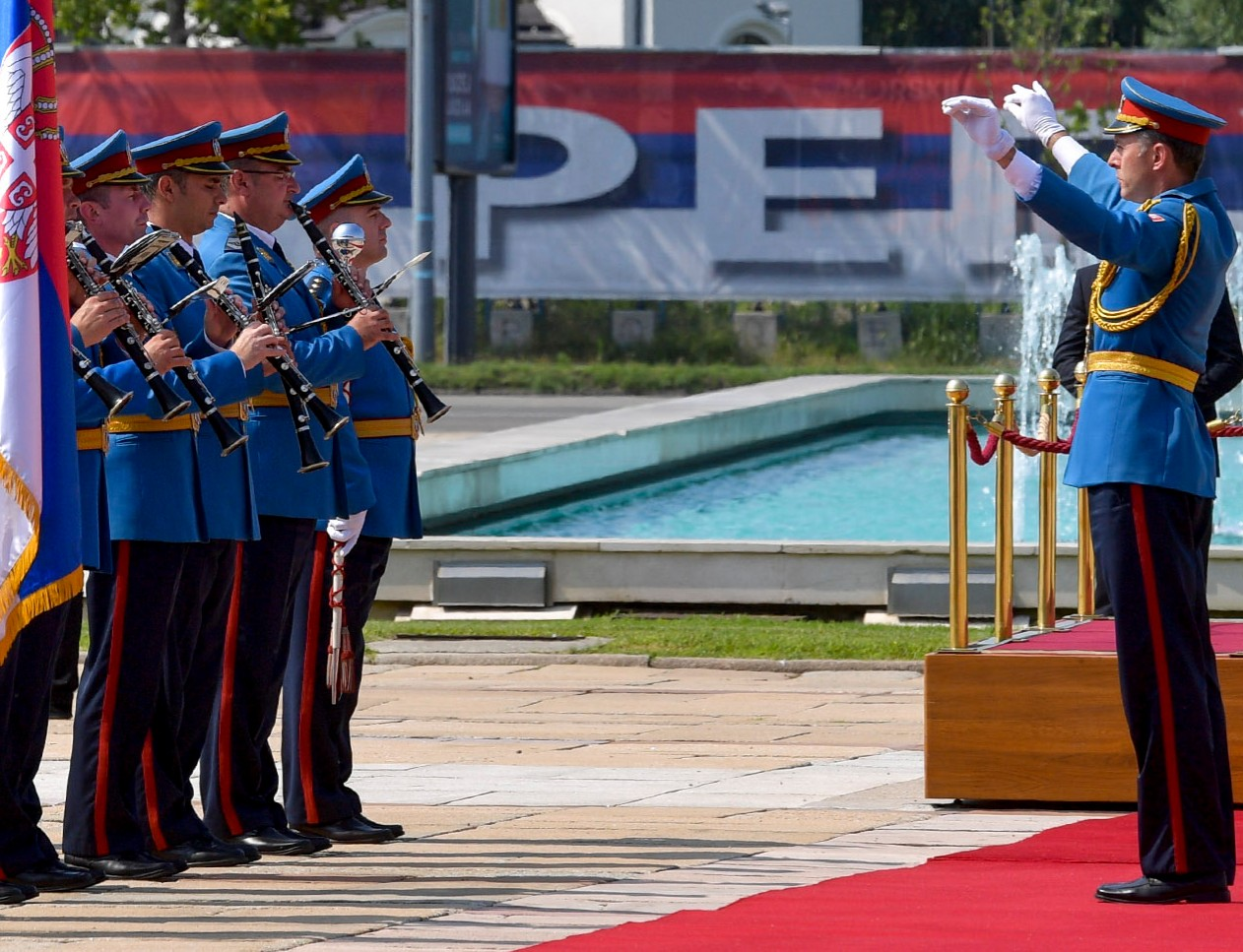
- Band at the arrival ceremony of Petro Poroshenko, 2018.
- Active: 1831–present
- Country: Serbia
- Branch: Serbian General Staff
- Type: Military Band
- Part of: Serbian Armed Forces
- Garrison/HQ: Topčider, Belgrade

Commanders
- Notable commanders: Dragutin Pokorni (1921–1924)

The Band of the Guard of the Serbian Armed Forces (Serbian: Репрезентативни оркестар Гарде Војске Србије, romanized: Reprezentativni orkestar Garde Vojske Srbije) is the official representative military band of the Guard of the Serbian Armed Forces and the Serbian Armed Forces in general. It provides musical support to the President of the Republic and the Serbian General Staff.

== History ==
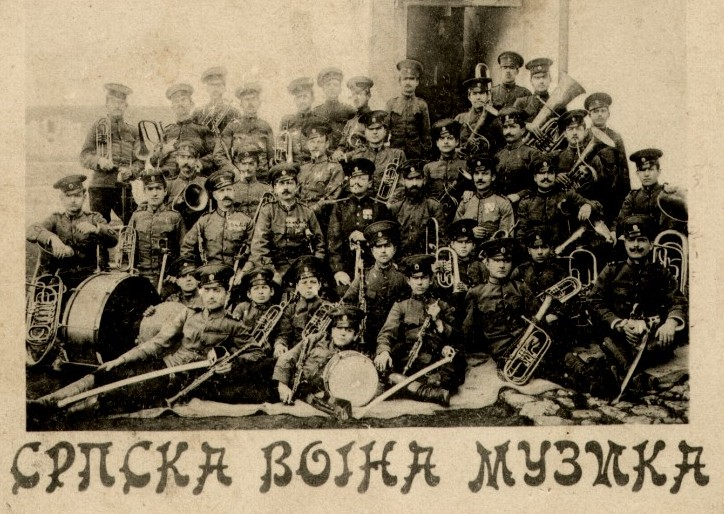
Royal Guard Band, 1904

The first military band in Serbia was founded in 1831 by decree of Prince Miloš Obrenović under the title of Knjaževsko–Serbska Banda. The chief of the band was bandmaster Josif Šlezinger who was sent to Kragujevac by prince's brother Jevrem. Dressed in ornate uniforms, the bands performed during plays in the Prince's Theatre. During that period many Serbian newspapers published articles in which they compared the band with the most experienced of Europe, including the French Republican Guard Band and the Band of the Grenadier Guards. In 1899, Serbian composer, conductor, and pedagogue Stanislav Binički began collaborating with the Belgrade Military Band and at the beginning of the 20th century, he founded the Royal Guard Band on the basis of the Prince's Band, being the only professional band at that time in the country. During his time with the band, he introduced its members to a more classical repertoire with pieces such as Franz Schubert's 8th Symphony and Antonín Dvořák's Slavonic Dances.

In 1945, the band was re-founded by order of Marshal Josip Broz Tito as the Band of the Guard of the Yugoslav People's Army. (Note: Serbo-Croatian: Reprezentativni orkestar Garde Jugoslovenske narodne armije, Репрезентативни оркестар Гарде Југословенске народне армије Macedonian: Репрезентативен оркестар на гардата на Југословенската народна армија, romanized: Reprezentativen orkestar na gardata na Jugoslovenskata narodna armija Slovene: Reprezentativni orkester Garde Jugoslovanske ljudske armade) It continued the tradition pioneered by partisan bands in popularizing songs and music from the National Liberation War and became a cultural institution that developed a wide artistic culture throughout the Yugoslav People's Army. The task of the band at the time was to perform protocol duties at the highest of bodies in the Socialist Federal Republic of Yugoslavia on behalf of the JNA. With the break-up of Yugoslavia, the Guard Orchestra remained within its scope of work. Protocol tasks at the highest state level, representation of the Republic of Serbia and the Serbian Armed Forces both at home and abroad have remained the band's primary responsibility.

== Organization ==
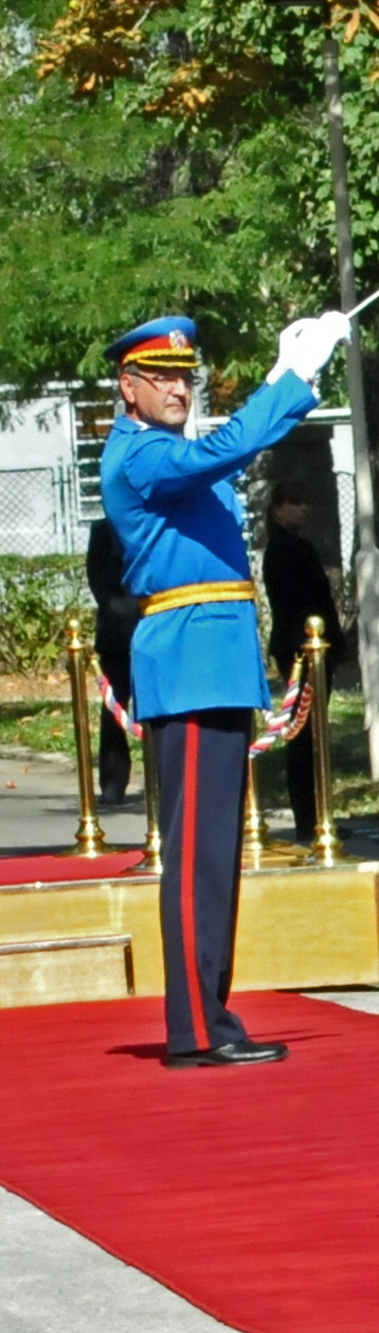
Bandmaster of the Guard Band

Depending on the needs, the band was increased and decreased numerically, which also led to the change of its name. As a rule, the best musicians who played on two or more instruments formed part of the band. Due to this, the band can be organized into the following ensembles:

- Concert band
- Symphony orchestra
- Chamber orchestra
- Chamber brass, woodwind or string ensembles
- Big band/disco orchestra

== Missions ==
Band regularly performs on arrival ceremonies of foreign state and military dignitaries, on public holidays in Serbia (Statehood Day and Armistice Day in particular), anniversary days of the Guard and the Serbian Armed Forces, as well as at the military parades. Other occasions in which the band took part include:

- 1984 Winter Olympics
- 1961 and 1989 Non-Aligned Movement summits of heads of state.
- Military tattoos
  - Modena International Military Tattoo (2001)
  - International Military Music Festival at Albertville (2002)
  - Linz Military Bands Festival (2010)
  - Bremen Tattoo (2011)
- Liège Festival of Military Bands (2014 and 2018), on the centenaries of the outbreak and end of World War I

A lot of the pieces in the repertoire of the band are written by composer Stanislav Binički, who wrote common marches such as the Gardijski marš, March on the Drina and the Paradni marš. Unlike the rest of the armed forces, when on parade, the band does not perform the traditional high step and, before 1975, the goose step.

== List of conductors ==
Since its founding in 1945, the conductors of the band have been:

- Tomaž Zajc (1945-1948)
- Iso Dracula (1948-1955)
- Gvido Uchakar (1956-1963)
- Gojko Bošnjak (1963-1972)
- Mihailo Petras (1972-1973)
- Franc Klinar (1973-1977)
- Mihailo Petras (1977-1984)
- Ilija Ilijevski (1984-1992)

== See also ==
- Military Band
