= Petar Matić (businessman) =

Serbian businessman and amateur racing driver (born 1966)

- Born: 3 September 1966 (age 59); Maribor, SR Slovenia, SFR Yugoslavia
- Occupation: Businessman

Petar Matić (Serbian Cyrillic: Петар Матић; born 3 September 1966) is a Serbian businessman and amateur racing driver, the owner of MPC Holding and MPC Properties. He is believed to be one of the richest people in Serbia.

== Early life ==
Matić was born in Maribor, Slovenia and studied at the Faculty of Hotel Management in Opatija, Croatia. Before moving to Belgrade, Serbia, he had already developed a business on the Croatian coast mainly involved in retail footwear and apparel.

== Career ==
After moving to Belgrade in 1989 Matić founded the company MPC (incorporating his initials into the name), which went on to be very successful in the following years. In 1991 MPC was transformed into the MPC Group with significant growth and expanded activities. In 2003 it had two main divisions: Real Estate and Trade.

Soon afterwards, Matić went on to establish MPC Holding and MPC Properties, a leading companies in trade and real estate development in the region. In 2007 MPC Properties entered into the strategic partnership with Merrill Lynch / Bank of America. This was the first investment made by Merrill Lynch in the territory of former Yugoslavia.

Matić's companies became market leaders in that part of Europe. They employ over 1,000 people and are some of the most significant investors in Serbia. The companies have been awarded retail, commercial, residential and logistics projects that are importance in the region. This includes as an example the Business Center Ušće, the Usce Shopping Center, IMMO outlet Centers, Business Center "Tri Lista Duvana" and residential/condominium "OASIS".

Matić chooses to stay out of the public eye, as he does not give interviews to the press, and his photographs cannot be found in local newspapers.

Matić is also a member of ICSC – International Council of Shopping Centres.
