= Bogosav Živković =

Serbian sculptor and painter (1920–2005)

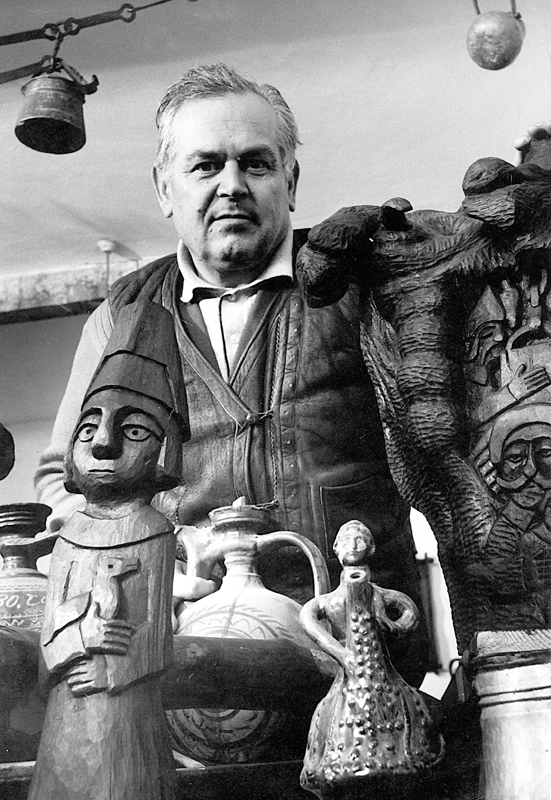
- Živković with his works
- Born: Bogosav Živković; 3 March 1920; Leskovac, Lazarevac; Kingdom of Yugoslavia
- Died: 28 October 2005 (aged 85); Belgrade, Serbia and Montenegro
- Known for: Sculpture
- Movement: Outsider art, Naïve art

Bogosav Živković (Serbian Cyrillic: Богосав Живковић; 3 March 1920 – 28 October 2005) was a prominent Serbian sculptor and painter of Naïve and Outsider art.

== Biography ==
Bogosav Živković was born in Leskovac, near Lazarevac, in 1920. As a young man, he was trained in the craft of leather working, and was taught how to sew leather jackets decorated with floral and geometric borders. Due to poor health, he gave up working with leather in 1945 and moved to Belgrade, where he found a job as a door attendant. He created his first sculpture in 1957, and held his first independent exhibition in 1960. He was soon recognized globally as an important leader in naïve and marginal art. His work is often categorized as Art Brut, and has been the central subject of exhibitions in major museums in Europe, as well as in North America and South America. He died in Belgrade in 2005.

== Style and work ==
Much of Živković's work was inspired by a seminal dream. In his dream, he saw a large serpent moving swiftly across a meadow, leaving a slimy track behind. With its tail, the serpent caught a stranger dressed in a monk's cowl and robe. The intensity of the dream led Živković to carve his visions in wood in order to gain a sense of release from his nightmare. To express himself, Živković used the natural shape of the trunk with or without branches, then smaller and thinner parts of branches, even ivy roots. Natural protuberances and hollows, various gnarls, and the mere mass of the matter inspired the artist to create the most diverse forms.

His chisel followed the natural configuration of the wood, thus liberating, cutting, trimming and shaping anthropomorphic and zoomorphic figures, and less frequently animal or architectural shapes. He mostly carved in relief, which he used to cover his monumental columns.

Oto Bihalji-Merin, Michel Thevos, Roger Cardinal, and others wrote about his work.

== Exhibitions and awards ==
A great number of his monumental sculptures are in galleries and museums. Some, such as My Home and Dreams and Thought, are in the collection of the Museum of Naïve and Marginal Art (MNMA), in Jagodina. The Magic Garden, in his native village, is a temple of his art with many sculptures – in stone and wood, reliefs of carved objects, coloured accessory edifices, etc. – which bears best witness to his work.

Živković had a number of independent and group exhibitions worldwide. He has had solo exhibitions in Belgrade, Vienna, Paris, Warsaw, Stockholm, Munich and Amsterdam. Among his awards are Grand Prix at the Second Biennial of Yugoslav Naïve Art in 1983 and Award for Entire Artistic Work in 1991, MNMA, Jagodina, Serbia.

== Gallery ==
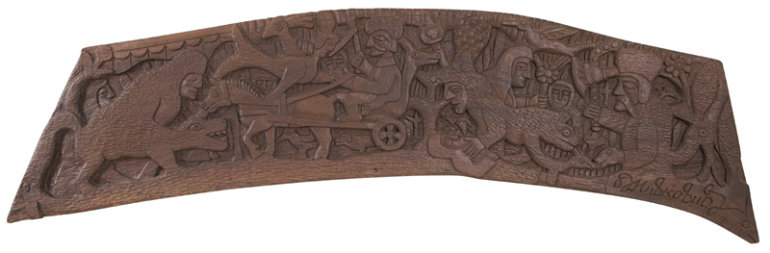
My father on Coach and Dreams, 1973, wood, 28 cm × 129 cm (11 in × 51 in), MNMA

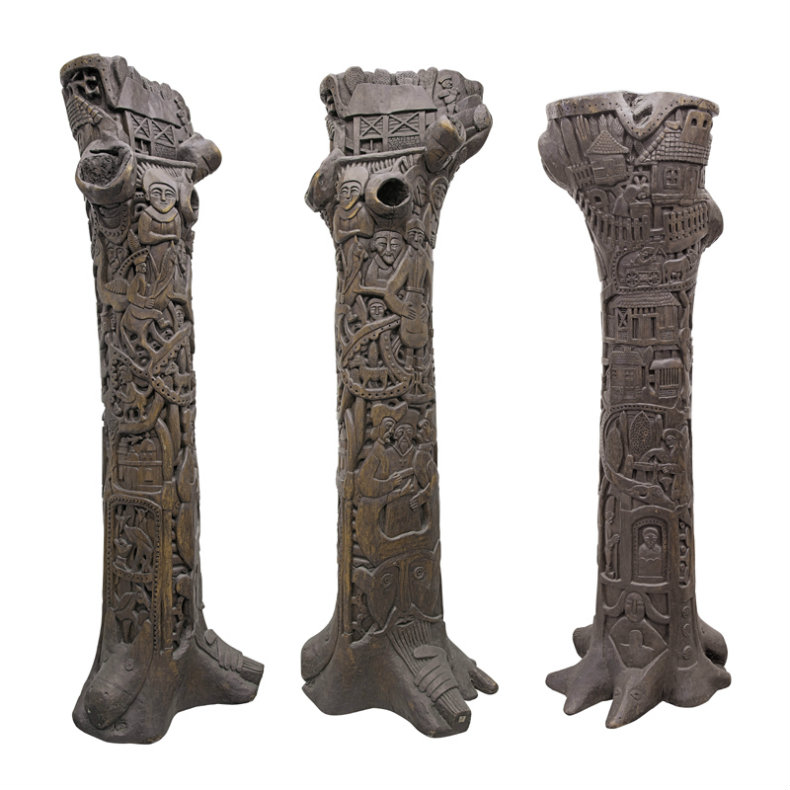
My Home, wood, 204 cm (80 in) tall, MNMA

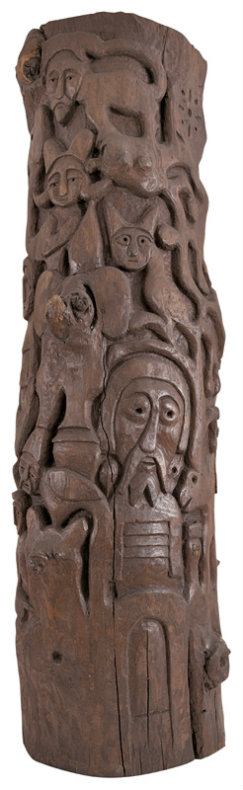
A big-eyed Monster, wood, 106 cm (42 in) tall, MNMA

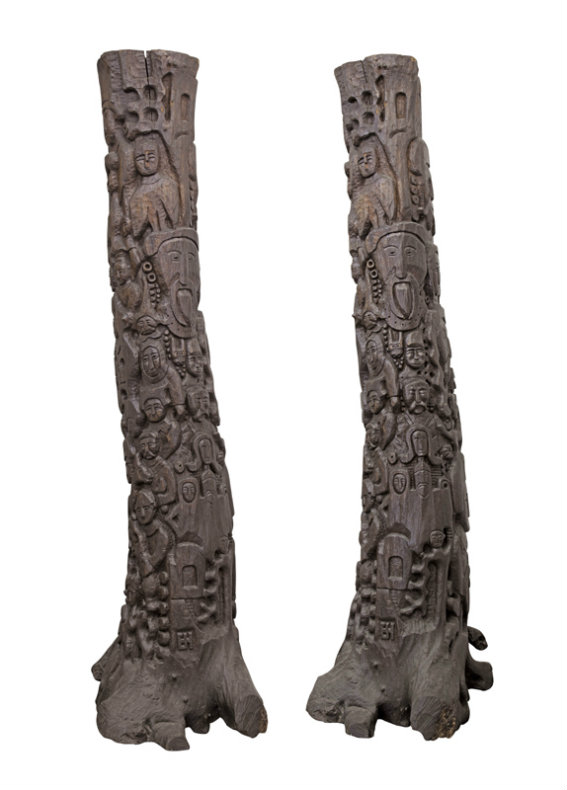
Dreams and Thought, c.1965, wood, 295 cm (116 in) tall, MNMA

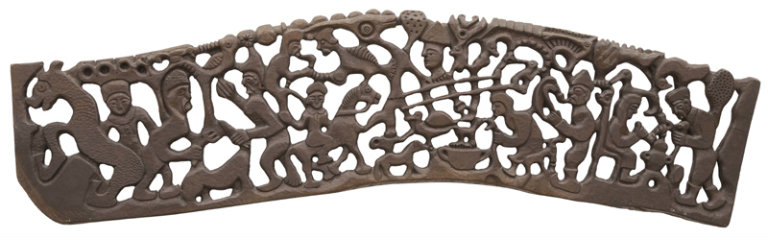
Gate, wood (relief), 45 cm × 172 cm (18 in × 68 in), MNMA

== Literature ==
- Ото Бихаљи-Мерин, Снови и трауме у дрвету, Београд, 1962
- М. Бошковић; М. Маширевић, Самоуки ликовни уметници у Србији, Торино, 1977
- Ото Бихаљи-Мерин; Небојша Бато Томашевић, Енциклопедија наивне уметности света, Београд, 1984
- Н. Крстић, Наивна уметност Србије, САНУ, МНМУ, Јагодина, 2003
- Н. Крстић, Наивна и маргинална уметност Србије, МНМУ, Јагодина, 2007
- Љ. Којић, Богосав Живковић, МНМУ, Јагодина, 2011
- N. Krstić, Outsiders, catalogue, МНМУ, Јагодина, 2013
- N. Krstić, Outsider Art in Serbia, monograph, MNMA, Јагодина, 2014, pp. 74–81
- Cardinal, Roger, Outsider Art (New York: Praeger, 1972)
- DuBuffet, Jean, Art Brut (Geneva: Booking International, 1985)
- Oto Bihalji-Merin, Bogosav Zivkovic. The world of a primitive sculptor. (London: Thames & Hudson, 1962)
