= Ušće Towers =

Skyscraper in Belgrade, Serbia

- Пословни центар Ушће Poslovni centar Ušće
- Ušće Towers in October 2026

- Location within Belgrade

General information
- Status: Complete (First tower); Complete (Second tower)
- Location: New Belgrade, Belgrade, Serbia, Bulevar Mihajlo Pupin 6
- Coordinates: 44°48′58″N 20°26′13″E
- Construction started: 1962
- Completed: 1964
- Renovated: 2005
- Owner: MPC Holding

Height
- Height: roof 110 m (360.9 ft)

Technical details
- Floor count: 25
- Floor area: 25,000 m^{2} (269,100 sq ft)
- Lifts/elevators: 7 (+ 1 freight)

Design and construction
- Architect: Mihailo Janković
- Main contractor: European Construction

Website
- www.uscetower.rs

The Ušće Towers (Serbian Cyrillic: Пословни центар Ушће, romanized: Poslovni centar Ušće) are two 25-story mixed-use skyscrapers located at Mihajlo Pupin Boulevard in the New Belgrade municipality of Belgrade, Serbia. The first tower, 98 meters tall, was the tallest building in Serbia and the Balkans for 15 years until the construction of the Genex Tower in 1979. It was also the second-tallest freestanding structure, after the Avala Tower, in Serbia during this time. Construction of the second tower, designed as a twin of the first, began in 2018 and was completed in June 2020.

Built in 1964, the first Ušće Tower overlooks the confluence (Serbo-Croatian: ušće) of the Danube and Sava rivers from the New Belgrade side. It was originally used as the headquarters of the Central Committee of the League of Communists of Yugoslavia, which broke apart in 1990.

Ušće was frequently leased out to commercial interests until 21 April 1999, when it was severely damaged by successive NATO airstrikes as part of the 1999 NATO bombing of Yugoslavia. Beginning in 2003, the tower was reconstructed, including a two-floor increase (103,9m / 340,9 ft in total) in height, with the addition of a 26m antenna, which in strict architectural terms does not count as structural height, however, in structural height would actually be 103,9 m. The reconstructed tower is now being rented out to tenants.

== History ==
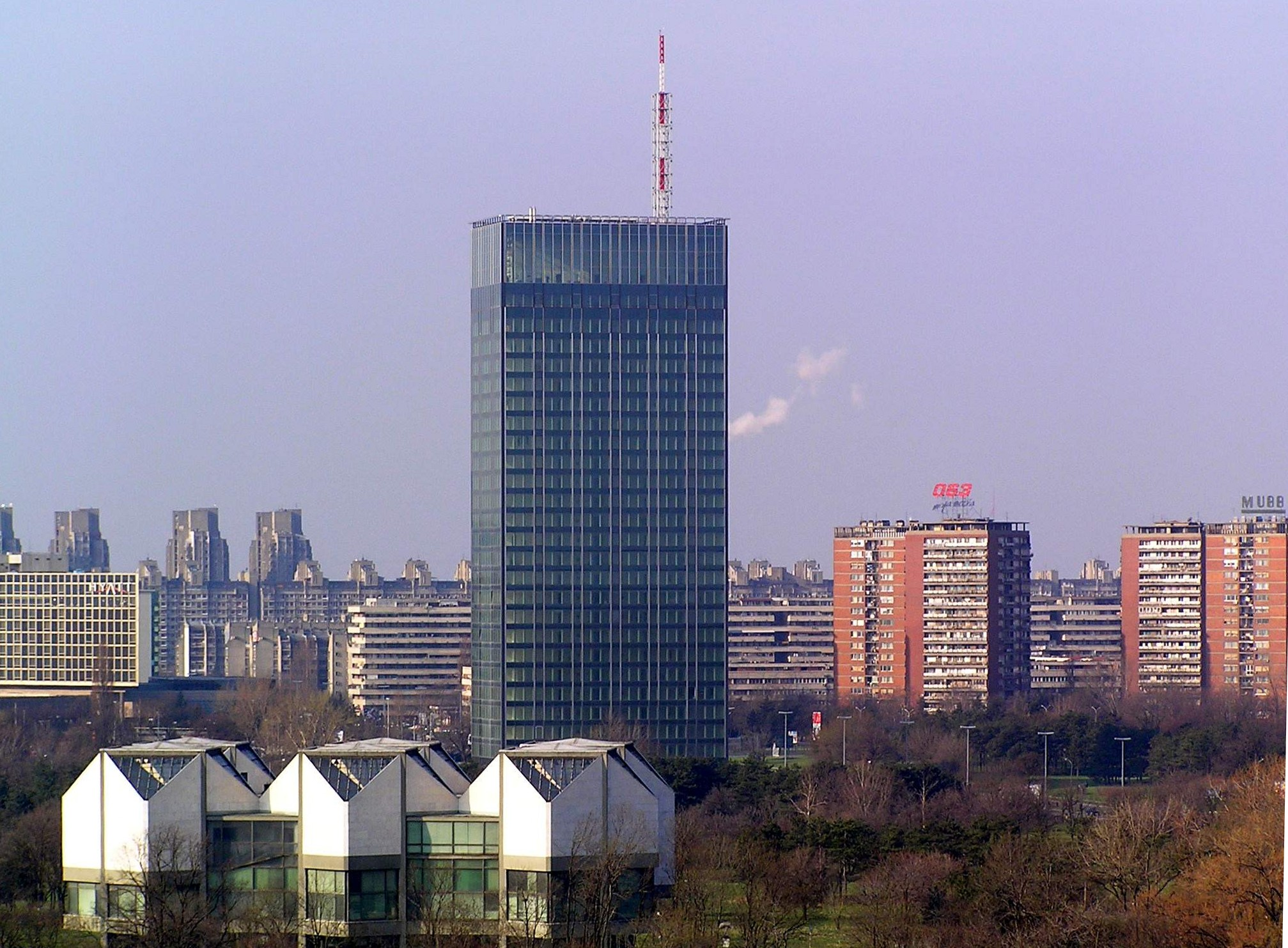
Ušće Tower in 2005

Ušće Tower was built in 1964 as the headquarters of the Central Committee of the League of Communists of Yugoslavia. The original building was 105 meters tall. Even today many people still call it "CK", which is the acronym for Centralni Komitet (Central Committee). During the "golden years" of Yugoslavia the lights were left partially turned on during the night to spell out "TITO", after president Josip Broz Tito.

In 1979, the building became a target of Nikola Kavaja, who hijacked American Airlines Flight 293 with the intention of crashing the plane into it. He turned himself in to the authorities before he could go ahead with his plan.

During the collapse of Yugoslavia in the 1990s, the Socialist Party of Serbia occupied the first ten floors of the building. The party leased out many of the floors to domestic companies. They kept however 9 levels as offices for their party. The cabinet of Josip Broz Tito was cleared out.

Later in the 1990s, three Serbian television stations occupied some of the levels in the building: RTV BK Telecom, RTV Pink and TV Košava.

MPC Holding, a holding company of Petar Matić, purchased the building in 2002.

=== NATO bombing ===
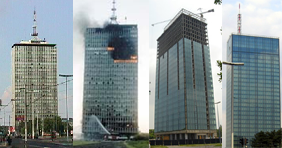
CK - NATO bombing - reconstruction - Ušće Tower

On 21 April 1999, NATO airstrikes hit the building, setting the upper floors on fire. Days later, several Tomahawk cruise missiles were fired at it. Despite the heavy damage, the building did not collapse and remained structurally intact. There were no reported deaths or injuries in the attack as the building was unoccupied at the time.

=== Reconstruction ===
Reconstruction work on the building started in early 2003 and was carried out by European Construction. The reconstruction was completed in 2005 and the official opening took place in July that year. Two additional floors were added—conference halls are located on the 24th and a restaurant on the 25th The multimillion-dollar project has 25 stories (above ground), totaling around 25,000 m^{2} of office space. An observation deck, fitness area and cafe are located on the top floor of the building. The observation deck is currently closed to the public, although there are plans to open it in the future.

The facade was redesigned and is now made entirely out of glass.

Addiko Bank is now renting out the first four floors of the building and has become the anchor tenant. This bank also has a light-ad on the building roof.

== Ušće Office Tower 2 ==
The city of Belgrade announced an architectural design competition in February 2003 for the Block 16, a section of New Belgrade in which the tower is located. The winning project was a design by architect Branislav Redžić, who envisioned a multi-functional urban center which would consist of two towers and a shopping mall. Tower I was reconstructed, shopping mall was built, albeit much larger than the one Redžić projected, but the Tower II remained on paper and a temporary parking lot was built instead.

After years of announcing it, MPC Properties, another Matić's company, revealed in January 2018 that the construction of the new tower, next to the old one, will commence in February. Characteristics of the new tower include height of 22 floors and 103.9 m (341 ft) and a total floor area of 28.000 m^{2} (301.39 sq ft) of an A-class commercial space. It is planned to have a restaurant on the top floor and a café and a bank on the ground floor. Chapman Taylor architectural company was hired to do the project, just as MPC hired Chapman Taylor to do the interiors and parts of the façade of the Ušće shopping mall. There will be two-leveled garage below ground, with a total area equal to the total floor area of the building. The foundation stone was laid on 27 February 2018. The building of the skyscraper cost €65 million.

Of the total floor area, 23,200 m^{2} (250,000 sq ft) will be used for commercial purposes. The building was officially opened on 11 June 2020.

== Ušće Business Center ==
The Ušće Mall was opened in April 2009. The mall has an area of 130,000 square metres (1,400,000 sq ft) on 6 levels, of which 50,000 square metres (540,000 sq ft) is retail space, with 150 stores, restaurants and cafés. The shopping mall also has a multiplex cinema with 11 screens, a bowling alley and a casino. Subterranean levels house a 4,000 m^{2} hypermarket and two levels of parking.

At the time of opening, Ušće was the largest shopping mall in Belgrade by floor area, and the most visited one. In sheer size, though not in number of visitors, it was surpassed by the Galerija Shopping Mall in Belgrade Waterfront in October 2020. In July 2022, a massive visual reimaging was announced. Designed by the Dutch company "TT Design", the year and a half long renovation will cost €17 million, though the exact dates are still unknown. Renovation will be conducted in phases, and the shopping mall will never be fully closed. Both the interior, and the façade, will be made more transparent, to allow more daylight, while the string of shops and restaurants will be allowed around the outer ground floor of the building, on the plateau which surrounds the building, as it is empty at the moment.

== Gallery ==
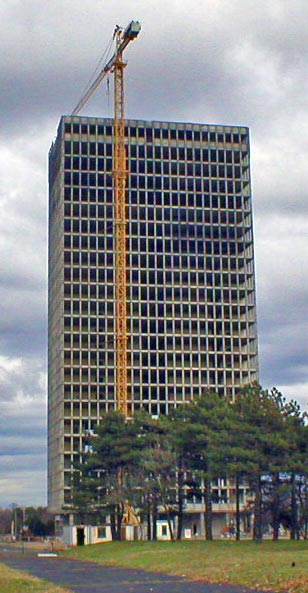
Reconstruction

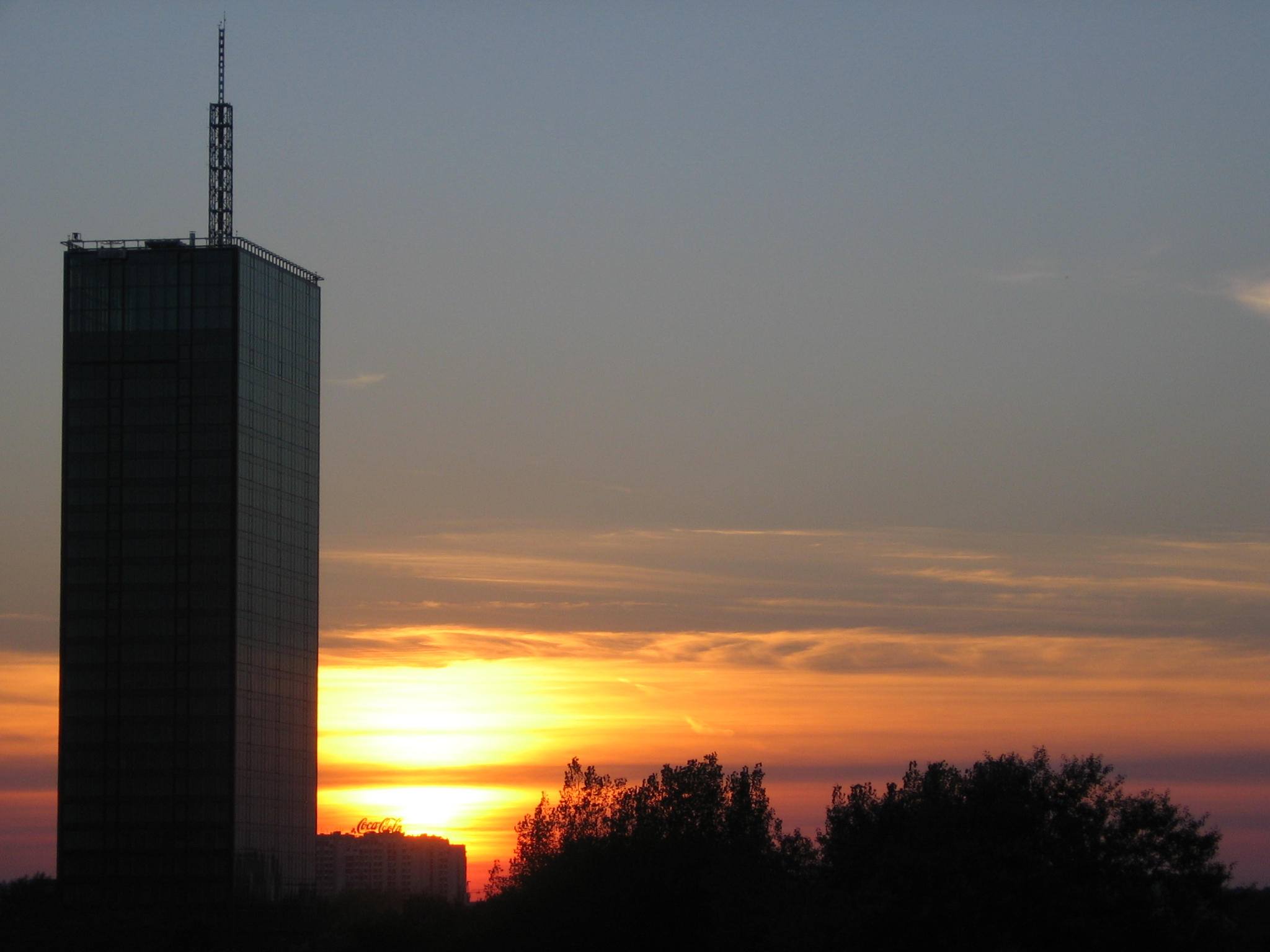
View of the Ušće Tower at sunset

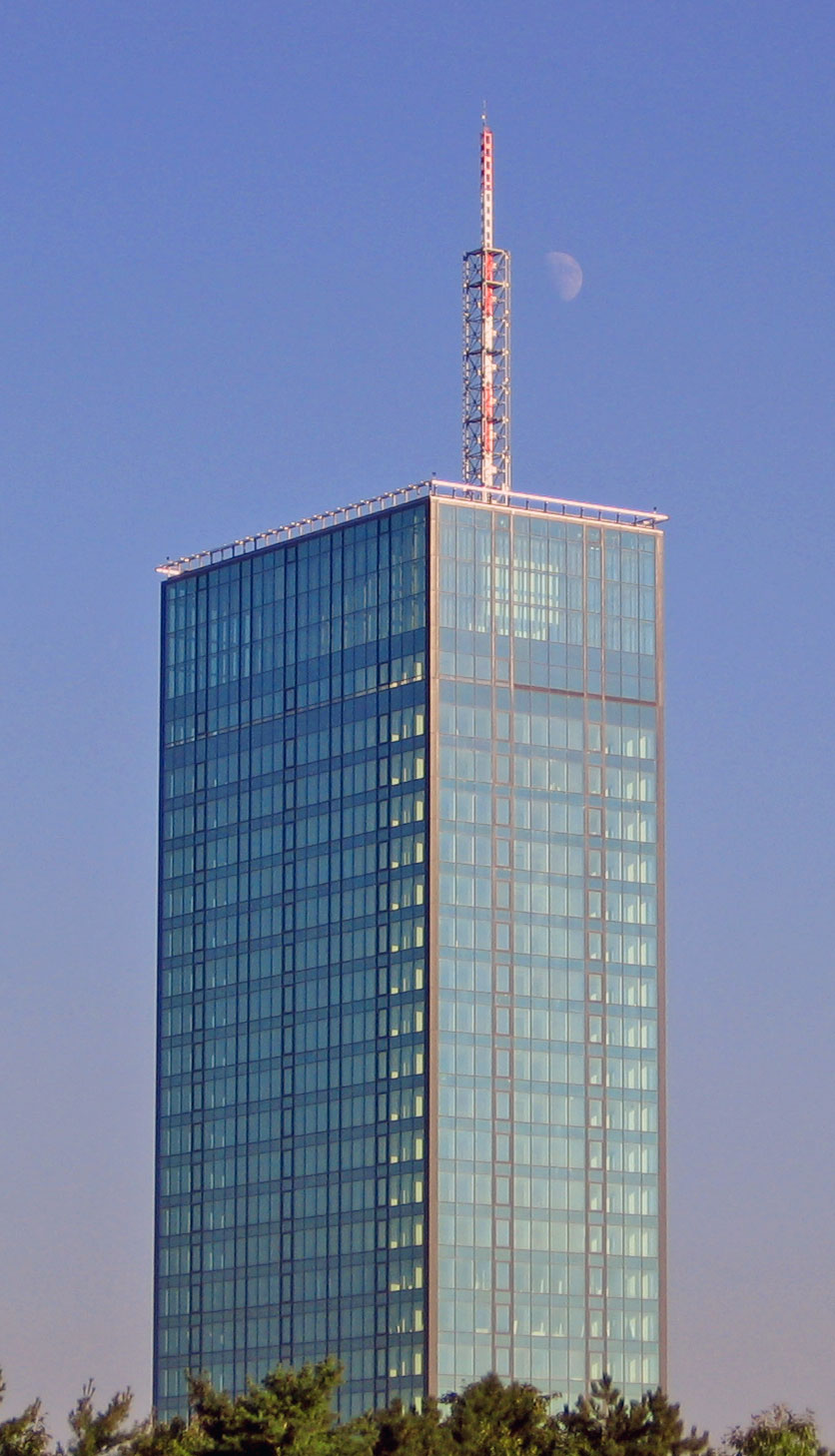
A view of the Ušće Tower in daytime

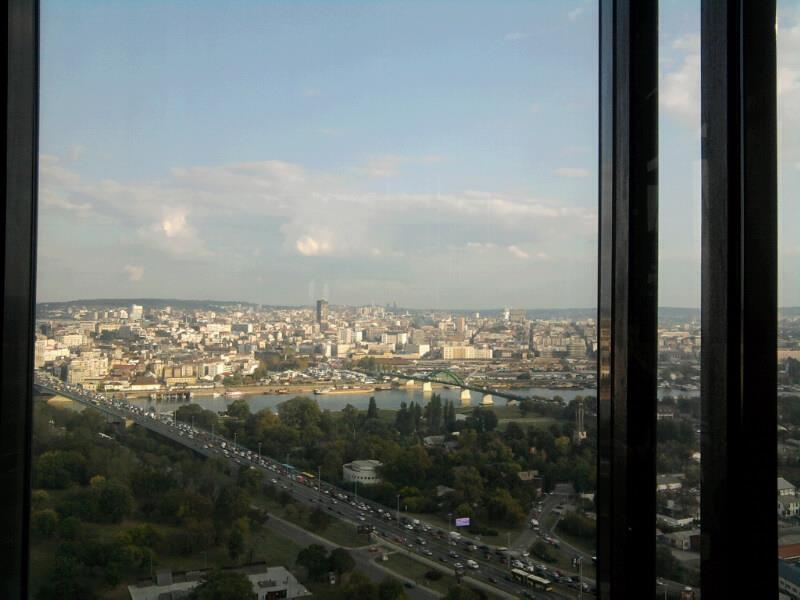
View from an office in the Ušće Tower

== See also ==
- List of tallest structures in Serbia
