= Western City Gate =

Building in Belgrade, Serbia

Western City Gate Genex Tower
- Западна капија Београда; Zapadna kapija Beograda
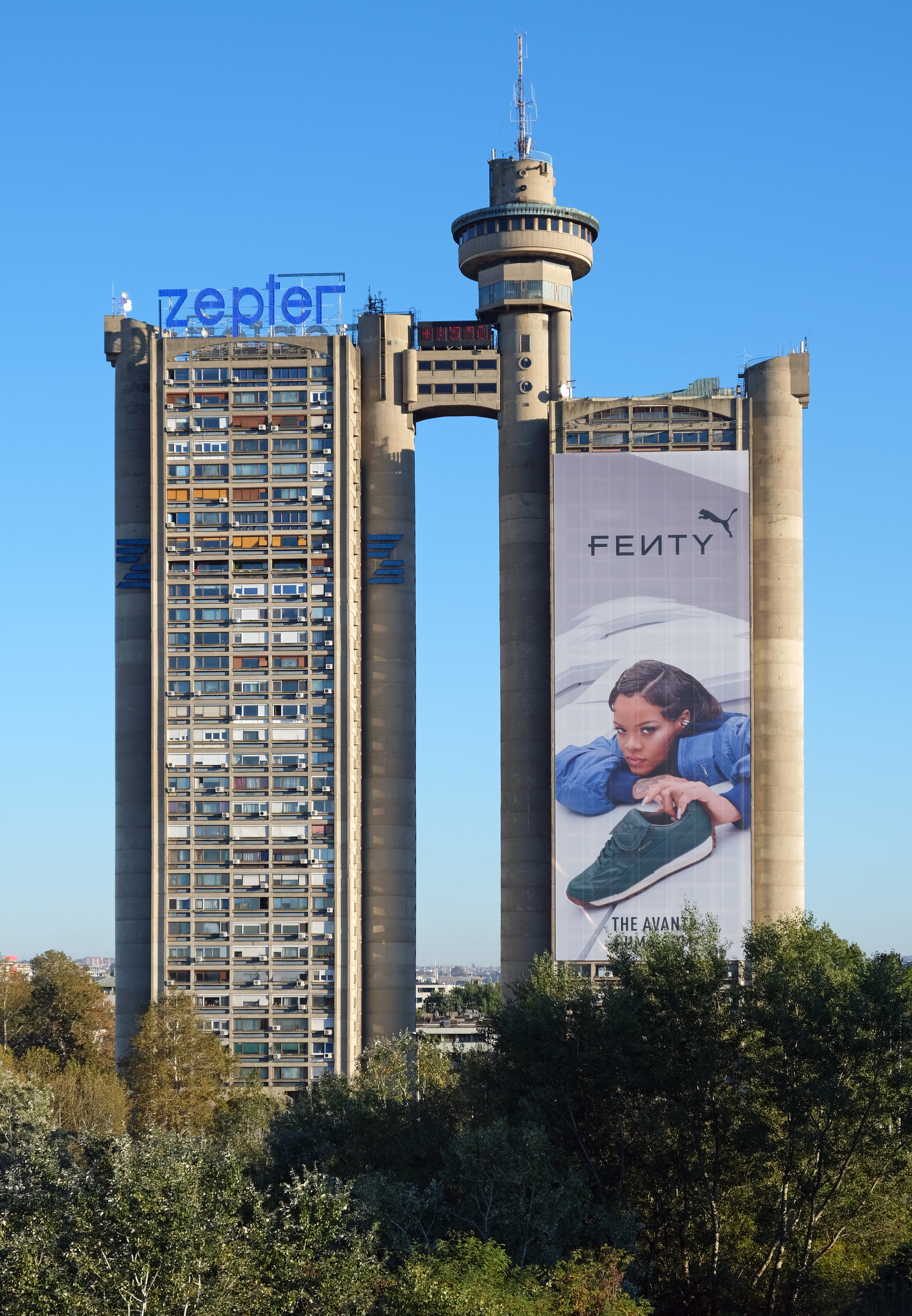
- Western City Gate in 2023

- Location within Belgrade
- Alternative names: Genex Tower

General information
- Type: Office and residential
- Architectural style: Brutalism
- Location: Belgrade, Serbia, Serbia
- Coordinates: 44°49′13″N 20°24′17″E
- Completed: 1979; 47 years ago
- Owner: Government of Serbia

Height
- Roof: 154 m (505 ft)

Technical details
- Floor count: 36
- Floor area: 16,000 m^{2} (170,000 sq ft)

Design and construction
- Architect: Mihajlo Mitrović

Cultural Heritage of Serbia
- Official name: Stambeno-poslovni centar „Geneks”
- Type: Cultural Monument
- Designated: 3 November 2021

The Western City Gate (Serbian: Западна капија Београда, romanized: Zapadna kapija Beograda), also known as the Genex Tower (Serbian: Кула Генекс, romanized: Kula Geneks) is a 36-story skyscraper in Belgrade, Serbia, which was designed in 1977 by Mihajlo Mitrović in the brutalist style. It is formed by two towers connected with a two-story bridge and revolving restaurant at the top. It is 117 m (384 ft) tall (with restaurant 135–140 m or 443–459 ft). It remained the tallest building in Serbia and Belgrade for 42 years, until being surpassed by West 65 Tower in 2021.

The building is designed to resemble a high-rise gate greeting people arriving in the city from the West (the road from Belgrade Nikola Tesla Airport to the city centre leads this way). Disputed and criticized during the designing and construction process, the building is today a dominant landmark in Belgrade. Construction of its eastern complement, the triple Eastern City Gate at the opposite, eastern end of Belgrade, began later, in 1973, but was finished earlier, in 1976.

One of the towers was occupied by the state-owned Genex Group. The tower got its popular name "Genex" after this group, while its official title remains Western City Gate. The second, taller tower, is residential. The tower formerly occupied by the Genex company is empty, while the residential tower is still home to scores of people. The revolving mechanism under the restaurant on top never became operational.

In November 2021, the building was declared a cultural monument and placed under protection. The declaration refers to the building as an "urban lighthouse" and calls it the most striking motif of New Belgrade, and a visual benchmark for the entirety of the capital. Considered avant-garde at the time when built, by the mid 2020s it was still described as the "more progressive than almost anything new built in Serbia".

== Location ==
The building is located in the municipality of New Belgrade, in the 41-43 Narodnih heroja Street. It is actually situated at the corner of the street and the European route E75. West of the gate are the neighborhoods of Studentski Grad and Tošin Bunar, while Fontana is to the north. In the New Belgrade's blocks numeration system, the building belongs to the Block 33.

== History ==
=== Construction ===
In the late 1960s, architect Mihajlo Mitrović was given a task of projecting a 12-floor building and the head offices of the local community of Sutjeska, a sub-municipal administrative unit, on Narodnih heroja Street. Mitrović suggested two connected and much taller buildings which would make a recognizable symbol of the capital city. A fierce opposition, disagreements and disputes ensued, but Mitrović was persistent in his idea, giving detailed and exhaustive explanations in front of the numerous commissions. He was finally given the green light and the foundations were laid in 1971. The towers were built by the "Rad" construction company.

Nevertheless, the project met with distrust and was disputed all the time the construction was on. One of the rare colleagues who publicly supported Mitrović was Stojan Maksimović, who several years later designed another Belgrade's landmark, the Sava Centar. Harsh public polemics with architectural engineer Borislav Stojkov, one of the Belgrade's urban planners at the time, and Mitrović caused a rift between the two which was amended only over a decade later. The opposition continued in the next years. Even in the 2010s, a famous caricature by Ivo Kušanić in the daily Politika is still being mentioned and reproduced. It shows a gallows next to the building and the text: Who are these gallows for? For the architect!

=== Privatization ===
"Generalexport", the company which owned the building went bankrupt in 2015, which was confirmed by the court in March 2017. The commercial half of the tower, with the related garage space, was offered for sale by the bankruptcy manager on 23 May 2022. Asked price was RSD 2 billion (€17 million), but no one made an offer. In July 2022 it was offered again, this time for RSD 1.46 billion (€12.4 million), or 35% of estimated worth (RSD 4.17 billion or €35.5 million).

By the end of 2022, with the third sale attempt—and the property now listed for RSD 834.6 million dinars (€7 million or €400 per m^{2}) — scheduled for 6 February 2023, residents, citizens and public figures began to protest the sale, offering ideas for the building's future. Building manager, and a group of architects and economists, proposed that state takes over the building due to its importance, and to transform it into the Tesla Tower, "oasis of spirit, culture and architecture". Five floors were adapted into the Nikola Tesla Museum, which would move into the building. With added science and technology centers, libraries, concert halls, galleries and bookshops, it would make a cultural and educational "Disneyland", opened non-stop. Proposition includes adaptation of the surrounding plateau, which covers 1 ha (2.5 acres), into the urban garden, theme gardens, park of friendship, outdoor gym, with pedestrian footbridge and revitalized fountain and amphitheater.

Coalition Zajedno also suggested that state should use its pre-emption right to purchase the building, converting its use to an academic campus by naming the University of Belgrade as an administrator while also employing students (architecture, interior design, construction) to adapt the building. A group of electrical engineers suggested addition of Mihajlo Pupin to the joint museum with Tesla, creation of experimental labs and recreation of the Wardenclyffe Tower at the top of Western City Gate. Do not let Belgrade drown political party also supported state ownership of the building. Residents announced blockade of the city's central bridge, Gazela, protesting the sale.

After many years, on 12 January 2023, the digital clock display which is located at the top, between two towers, was repaired and became operational.

At the public sale on 6 February 2023, the commercial part of the property was purchased by the Belgrade-based hospitality entrepreneur Aleksandar Kajmaković, nicknamed Aca Bosanac, for RSD 2.4 billion (~€20 million), three times its listed price. Kajmaković's company Eureka bar, which reportedly outbid six other entities vying for the property, owns numerous hospitality venues around Belgrade such as the traditional Skadarlija kafanas Tri šešira, Dva jelena, and Zlatni bokal, eatery Boutique, and Lafayette cabaret nightclub. Police had to intervene as few members of the opposition hеckled the bidding.

Kajmaković is connected to major criminal clans in Serbia, being a right-hand man of the "controversial businessmen" Predrag Ranković Peconi. He was also apprehended by the police as part of the process against the top Serbian gang kingpin Veljko Belivuk for suspicion of Kajmaković acting as the legal owner of Belivuk's properties which were safeguarded by the Belivuk's gang members, and for money laundering. A bomb was placed under Kajmaković's car in 2002 in Budva, Montenegro. Because of his history, the opposition considers Kajmaković a front for the real owner, and called for the annulment of the sale due to the general infringement of the entire process.

Last day to finalize the purchase was 4 April 2023, but "Eureka Bar" filed an extension motion. This was denied and they made the final payment on the last day, becoming official owners of the building. Otherwise, they would also lose the €7 million deposit they had to pay in order to compete in the selling. Tenants of the residential part of the building announced lawsuit against the purchase.

== Characteristics ==
=== Architecture ===
The two towers are not the same height and serve different purposes. The taller tower serves as a residential tower with 30 floors while the shorter tower houses businesses within its 26 floors. A bridge connects the two at the 26th floor. The building is 117.76 m (386.4 ft) tall.

The building was designed in the brutalist style, with some elements of structuralism and constructivism. It is considered a prime representative of the brutalist architecture in Serbia and one of the best of its style built in the 1960s and the 1970s in the world. The treatment of the form and details is slightly associating the building with postmodernism and is today one of the rare surviving representatives of this style's early period in Serbia. The artistic expression of the gate marked an entire era in Serbian architecture.

Commission which declared the building a cultural monument prized the simplicity of solutions, proportional order of two towers and the cylindrical top extension with the rotating mechanism, located above the central axis of the complex. The commission also described the design as specific and bold architectural creation, commending mural, too. Though the mechanism for rotating the circular restaurant at the top was never installed, the restaurant itself was operational. In time, thanks to its exquisite location, it became an elitist gathering point, much to the dismay of Mitrović.

As the structure with "striking form which affirmed it as the pronounced work of art", the building entered numerous works and encyclopedias, including Larousse. The building was featured in the New York's Museum of Modern Art 2018-2019 exhibition exploring the architecture of the former Yugoslavia, Toward a Concrete Utopia: Architecture in Yugoslavia, 1948–1980. The building was an inspiration for artist Damjan Dobrila and his 2023 exhibition "Geneks 2389", with ideas what the structure might look like 366 years in the future.

However, when the residents moved in, it turned out that despite the supreme quality of the exterior design of the double tower, the building was not much resident friendly. Problems included the capacity and malfunctions of the elevators, clogged garbage chutes, bad thermal and sound isolation, and lack of flexibility of the concrete panels which were the main construction material. Similar problems, even worse so, were in the gate's eastern counterpart. This raised a question whether people should live in the buildings designed as the symbols and landmarks.

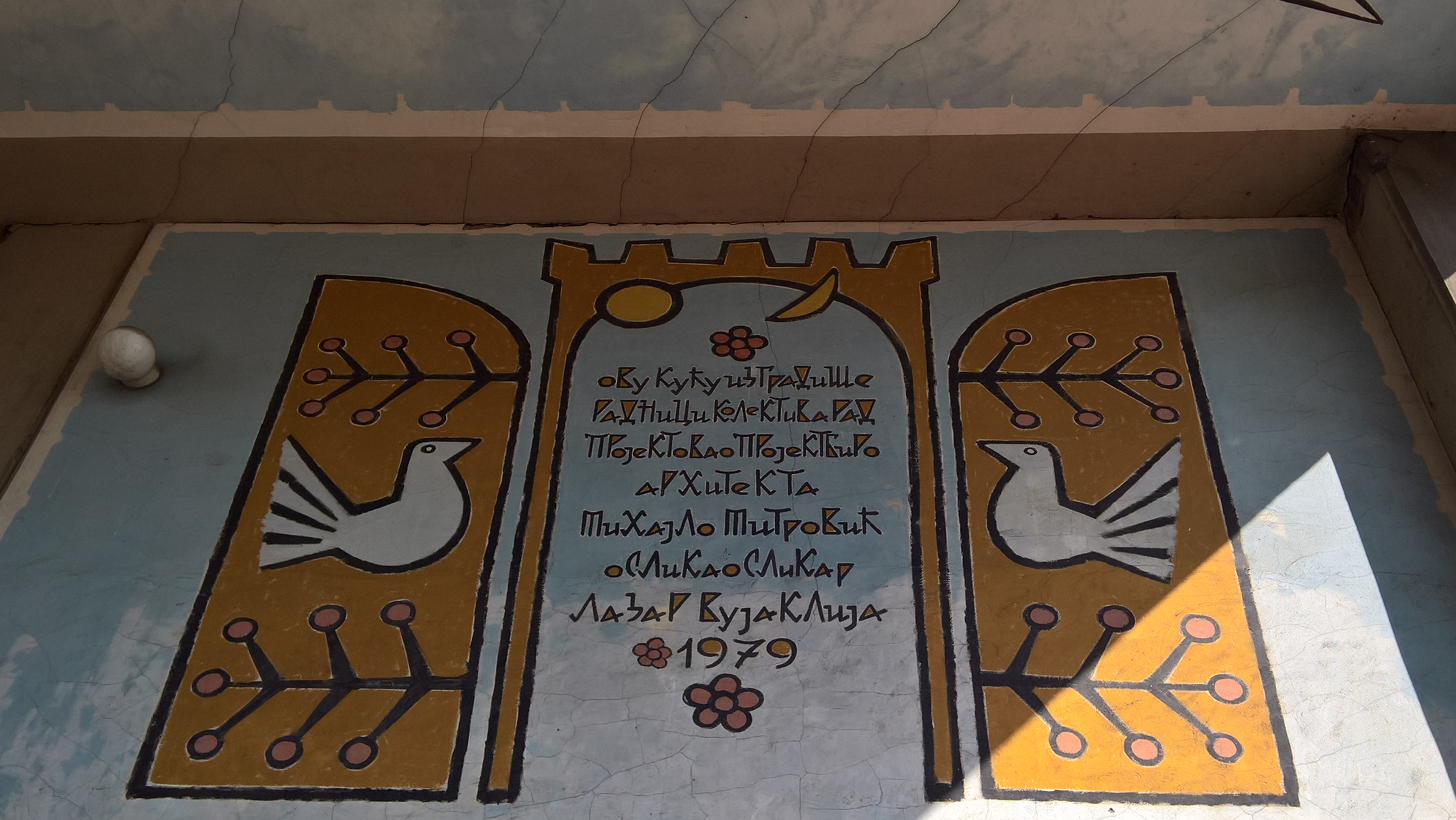
Section of Lazar Vujaklija's mural

=== Mural ===
In 1979, Lazar Vujaklija painted a mural at the entrance. The mural covers the façade and the ceiling above the entrance. It was one of the first murals in Belgrade, predated by the 1970 mural painted on a building in the Bulevar Revolucije, also done by Vujaklija. Another work was added in the 2010s, described by the architects as a "graffiti, which is unsuitable and not a work of art". After a reaction from the architects, the author of the graffiti decided to paint it over, in an agreement with Mihajlo Mitrović's daughter who inherited the author's rights.

The mural was commissioned by Mitrović and coincidentally served to commemorate the visit of François Mitterrand, then head of the French Socialist Party, to Yugoslavia. The mural has been described as an "ornament of the tower".

There is another work of art in the building, the sculpture "Bird" by Miloš Šobajić.

== Protection ==
The building is placed under the preliminary protection. It means it should be treated as if it were protected until the final decision about the protection is made. Association of Serbian Architects in 2019 filed a motion for Western City Gate to become a fully protected cultural monument. On 3 November 2021, the building was declared a cultural monument.

== Local community ==
The local community of Sutjeska had a population of 5,067 in 1981 and 5,187 in 1991. By the time of the 2002 census, it was renamed to the Local Community of Western Gate, after the building, and had a population of 4,278. It was later annexed to the neighboring local community of Fontana.

== Gallery ==
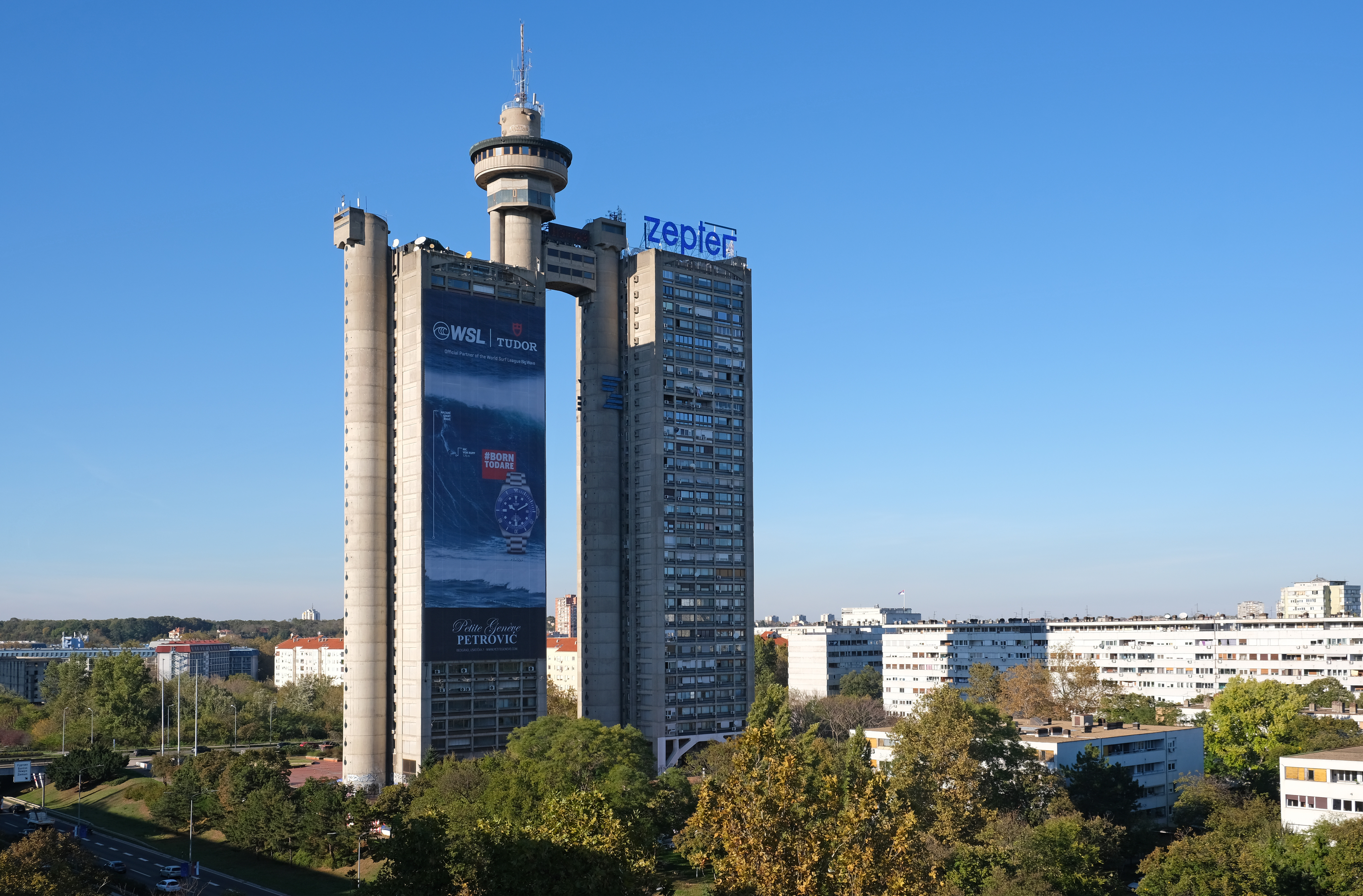

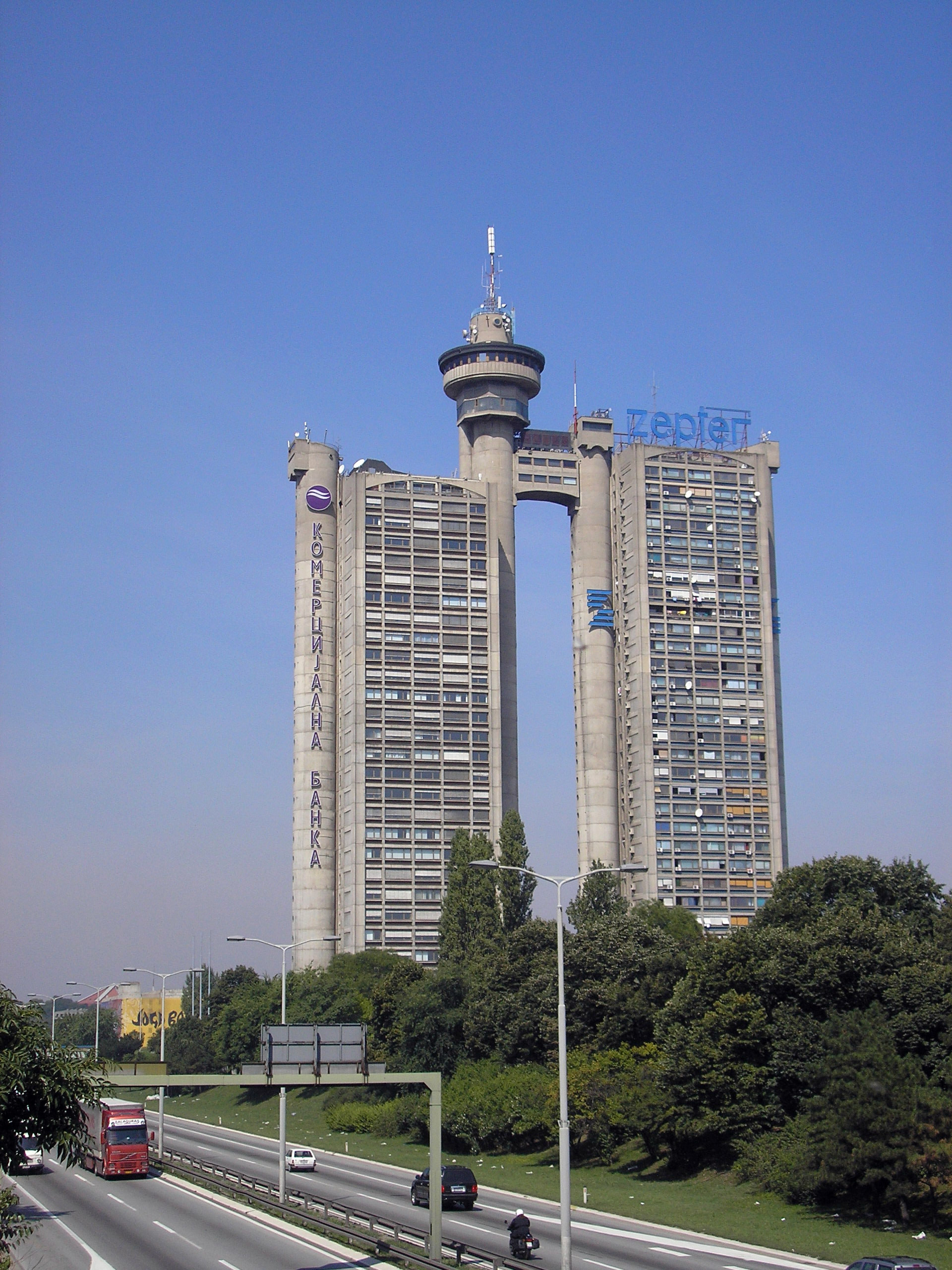

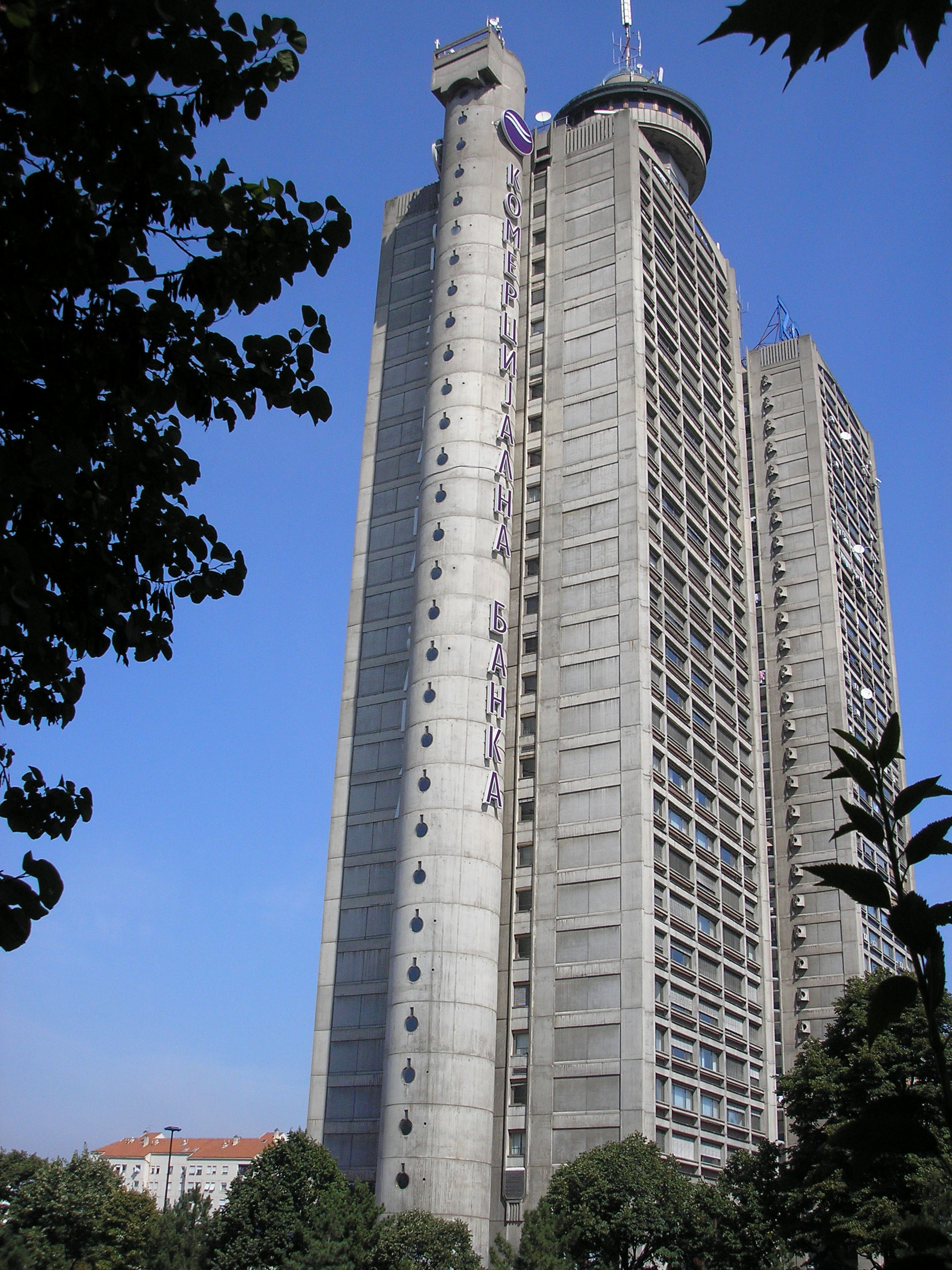

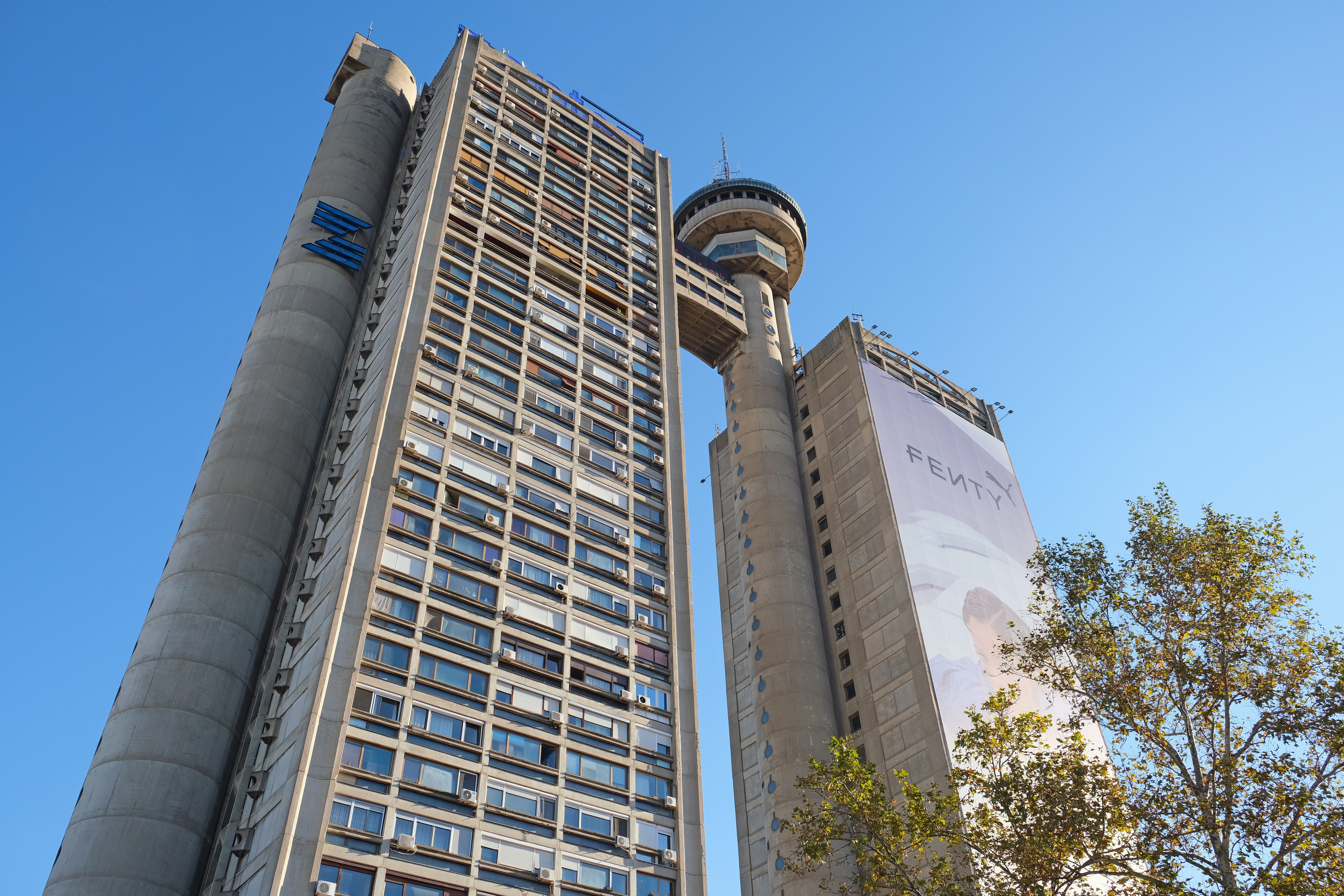

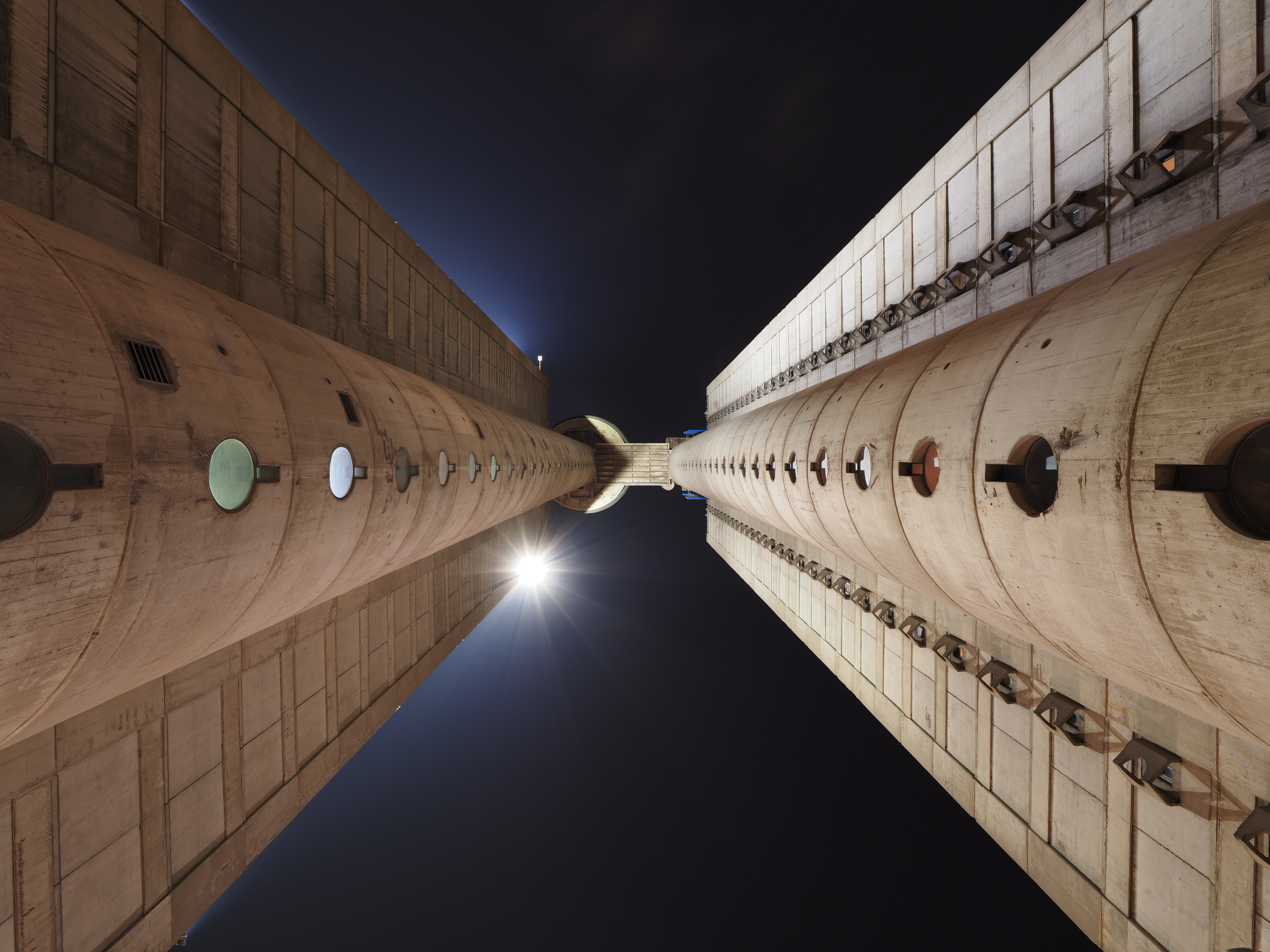

== See also ==
- Gates of Belgrade
- List of tallest buildings in Serbia
- List of Brutalist structures
- Trellick Tower and Balfron Tower, blocks of flats in London of similar design
