= Studentski Grad, Belgrade =

Studentski Grad Студентски град
- Urban neighbourhood
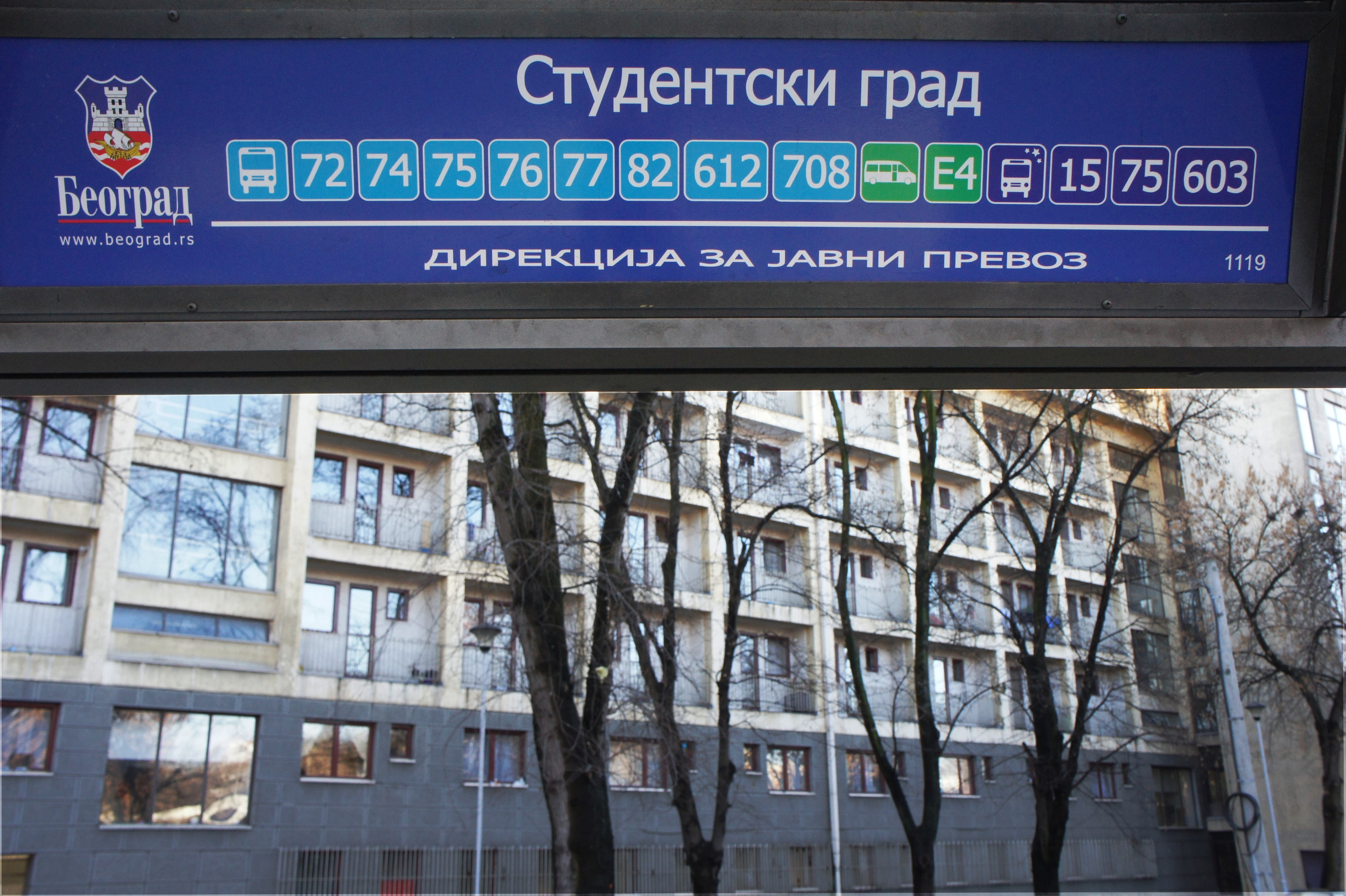
- Bus stop Studentski Grad
- Etymology: Student city
- Nickname: Studenjak / Студењак
- Interactive map of Studentski Grad
- Location within Belgrade
- Coordinates: 44.824734°N 20.399648°E
- Country: Serbia
- Region: Belgrade
- Municipality: New Belgrade
- Local community: Studentski Grad

Area
  - Total: 0.7 km^{2} (0.27 sq mi)

Population (2011)
  - Total: 10,605
  - Density: 15,000/km^{2} (39,000/sq mi)
- Time zone: UTC+1 (CET)
  - Summer (DST): UTC+2 (CEST)
- Area code: +381(0)11
- Car plates: BG

Studentski Grad (Serbian Cyrillic: Студентски град), or colloquially Studenjak (Студењак), is an urban neighborhood of Belgrade, the capital of Serbia. It is located in Belgrade's municipality of New Belgrade. Studentski Grad, as its name points out (Serbian for "Student City") is actually the campus of the University of Belgrade. It is the largest dormitory in Belgrade, originally constructed to accommodate nearly 5,000 students.

== Location ==
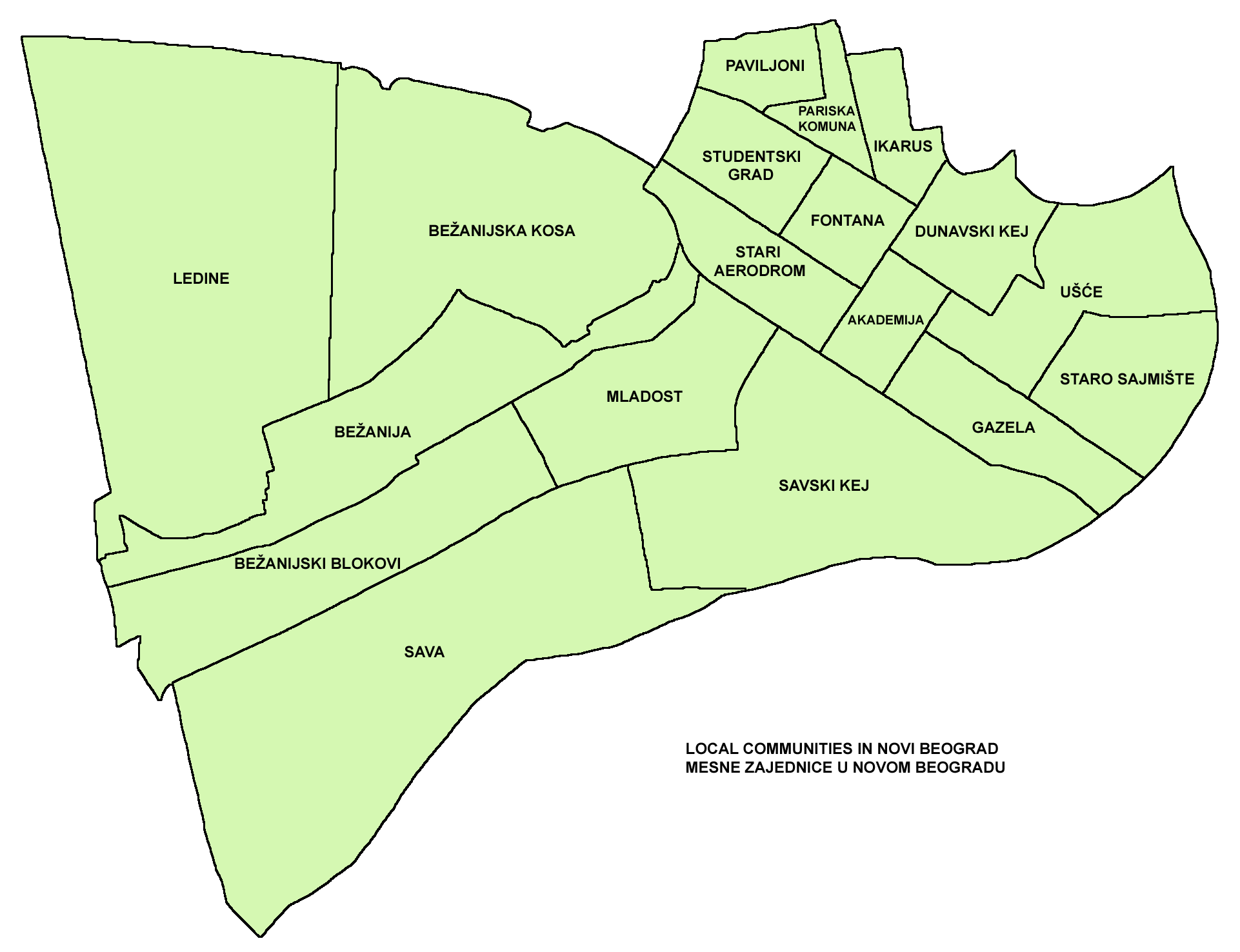
Map of Local communities in Novi Beograd

Studentski Grad is located in New Belgrade's Block 34 (and some smaller parts of Block 4), bounded by the neighborhoods of Bežanijska Kosa on the west and Fontana on the east. The area is encircled by the streets of Tošin Bunar and Narodnih heroja, Zoran Djindjić Boulevard and the Belgrade-Zagreb motorway (or the Boulevard of Arsenije Čarnojević). The local community includes a wider area to the north, blocks 3 and 4, delineated by the Pariske komune Street, and the neighborhood of Paviljoni.

== History ==
First public announcement of the construction was published on 7 January 1947, and the building started on 5 April 1949. It was projected originally for 4,500 beds. Only a year later, students already settled the Block III. Block II followed in 1952, and in 1955 Blocks I and IV were finished, completing the original project.

A massive and long reconstruction was conducted from 1985 and 1997, after which Studentski Grad gained its present appearance. All buildings got one additional floor, elevator shafts were added as annexes to each building, and all room were equipped with bathrooms and kitchenettes.

In July 2022, an international architectural design competition for the campus was announced. Apart from the reconstruction and adaptation of the four dormitories (except for the cultural center which is protected), it covers construction of the new building, and rearrangement of the parterre. New dormitory will be 32 metres (105 ft) high, and have space for additional 1,000 students. Addition of one more floor to older buildings is a possibility, but they must not reach over 32 metres (105 ft) of total height. The new building will be located in the southernmost section of the complex. The project is credited by the Council of Europe Development Bank. Design by the Turkish architects Cihan Sevindik and Sıddık Güvendi was selected in November 2022. Works are planned for the end of 2024.

In November 2022, representatives of the Movement of Free Citizens in the City Assembly of Belgrade, citing number of students, bad conditions in dormitories outside of Studenski Grad, and extreme rise in rents, suggested construction of another campus, with over 4,000 beds.

== Administration ==
Historical population
Year	Pop.	±%
1981	12,420	—
1991	17,374	+39.9%
2002	16,582	−4.6%
2011	10,605	−36.0%

Area covered today by the local community of Studentski Grad was previously divided in three: Veljko Vlahović (pop. 162 in 1981 and 4,706 in 1991), Radnih Brigada (pop. 4,793 in 1981 and 4,281 in 1991) and Carina (formerly Viktor Bubanj; pop. 7,465 in 1981, 8,387 in 1991 and 8,091 in 2002). In the 1990s, Veljko Vlahović and Radnih Brigada merged into the local community of Studentski Grad (pop. 8,491 in 2002) and by the 2011 census, Carina was merged into Studentski Grad, too. The population in 2011 was 10,605.

== Characteristics ==
The campus itself occupies the western part of the Block 34. It is the largest construction project of the University of Belgrade. It includes not only students rooms and a restaurant, but also two libraries with 50,000 books, gallery space, post office, cinema and theater building as part of the cultural center "Studentski Grad", spaces for conferences and podium discussions, an open stage for summer concerts and happenings, and one orthodox chapel dedicated to John Chrysostom.

There is also a structure called the "Boiler room", which, apart from being a technical space, hosts a multi-purpose sports hall. Within the complex are café "Fontana", several power transformers, mini-golf course, two basketball courts, minifootball court, and a trim trail. Green areas between the buildings are arranged in the park style. Total area of the campus is 10.4 hectares (26 acres), and is one of the largest in the Balkans. There are several commercial venues in the northwest corner of the campus (fast food, betting and photocopy shops, etc.

The campus is divided in four blocks (I, II, III and IV), or dormitories. Each block is further divided in two sub-blocks or wings, F and G. F wings have buildings seven storeys high, while G wings comprise buildings with six storeys. Altogether, Studentski Grad accommodates 4,406 students.

The cultural center "Studentski Grad" is placed under the state protection.
