= Dragoljub Mićović =

Serbian architect, writer (1929–2015)

- Native name: Драгољуб Мићовић
- Born: 2 December 1929 Rudo, Kingdom of Yugoslavia
- Died: 20 April 2015 (aged 85)
- Occupation: Architect, writer
- Period: 1997–2013
- Notable works: Five books "Записи старог руђанина" Story "Газдарица Невена" Books "Први рукометни кораци" Novel "Хроника породице са тромеђе"

Dragoljub Mićović (Serbian Cyrillic: Драгољуб Мићовић; 2 December 1929 – 20 April 2015) was a Serbian architect and writer.

He performed expert supervision during the construction of the Eastern City Gate of Belgrade residential complex and named them Rudo, after his hometown.

== Biography ==
Dragoljub was born on 2 December 1929 in Rudo, from father, Krsto, and mother, Nevena. He had seven brothers and sisters, the oldest was Veljko (1921), then Velinka (1922), who died in 1924 of scarlet fever, Siniša (1923), Ksenia (1925), Radmila (1926), Jelena (1927) and Darinka (1934). His father, Krsto, died on 6 April 1944.

Dragoljub attended the four-grade elementary school "Marija Sokolović" in Rudo . After finishing elementary school in 1940, he went to Belgrade, where he graduated from the Third Belgrade Gymnasium in 1945, and then secondary technical school in 1949. He studied architecture in Sarajevo, and graduated on 11 January 1958.

In his work, he was involved in designing buildings, urban projects and studies, performing works and supervising the construction of buildings, including the Eastern City Gate residential complex.

When he retired, he started to write books about the history of his hometown of Rudo, about the history of his family Mićović, about handball in Belgrade and Goražde. He often wrote about his testimonies from World War II, and about the constant change of occupiers during the war.

== Works ==
In total, he wrote six books, one novel, one short story, and one text.

=== Books ===
- Записи старог руђанина, 1997
- Први рукометни кораџи, 1999
- Записи старог руђанина 2, 2001
- Записи старог руђанина 3, 2003
- Записи старог руђанина 4, 2008
- Записи старог руђанина 5, 2013

=== Other works ===
- Novel Хроника породице са тромеће, 2005
- Story Газдарица Невена, 1998
- Text about Rudo, as the coauthor of Река Дрина и Подриње, 2000
