= Mićović =

Mićović (Serbian: Мићовић) is a Montenegrin and Serbian surname, which may refer to:

- Joanikije Mićović, metropolitan of Montenegro
- Marija Mićović, basketball player
- Milica Mićović, basketball player
- Strahinja Mićović, basketball player
- Vladimir Mićović, Serbian football goalkeeper
- Zoran Mićović, Mayor of Arilje

== See also ==
- Miković
