= Retenzija =

Neighbourhood of Belgrade, Serbia

Coordinates: 44°50′07″N 20°24′54″E

Retenzija (Serbian Cyrillic: Ретензија) is an urban neighborhood of Belgrade, the capital of Serbia. It is located in Belgrade's municipality of Zemun.

== Location ==
Retenzija is located in the southeastern section of urban Zemun, on the border with the municipality of Novi Beograd. It borders the neighborhoods of Donji Grad on the north, Zemunski Kej on the east and Paviljoni on the west. It is bounded by the Boulevard of Mihajlo Pupin and Aleksandra Dubčeka street (west), Nikola Tesla street (east) and the streets of 22. oktobra (north) and Džona Kenedija (south).

== Characteristics ==
Retenzija corresponds to the area of Blok 9b, one of 72 residential blocks drafted during the construction of Novi Beograd, which began in 1948. Due to the changes of the administrative borders of the city municipalities, several blocks are today part of the municipality Zemun and not Novi Beograd (9, 9a, 9b, 11, 11c, all in this area, and 50, the northernmost section of Bežanija).

Retenzija is a residential area with a population of 9,344 (local community or mesna zajednica Prve pruge, administrative municipal subdivision). Non-residential facilities include Čarolija Kindergarten, Nada Dimić Economics High School, Zmaj Student center and an ambulance. The neighborhood is just 100 meters away from the right bank of the Danube, separated from it by Zemunski Kej. The "retenzija" is the place where the steam railway engines are filled with water and coal. Retenzija was once part of the Zemun main railway station.
