= Eastern City Gate =

Buildings in Belgrade, Serbia

Coordinates: 44°47′3″N 20°30′44″E

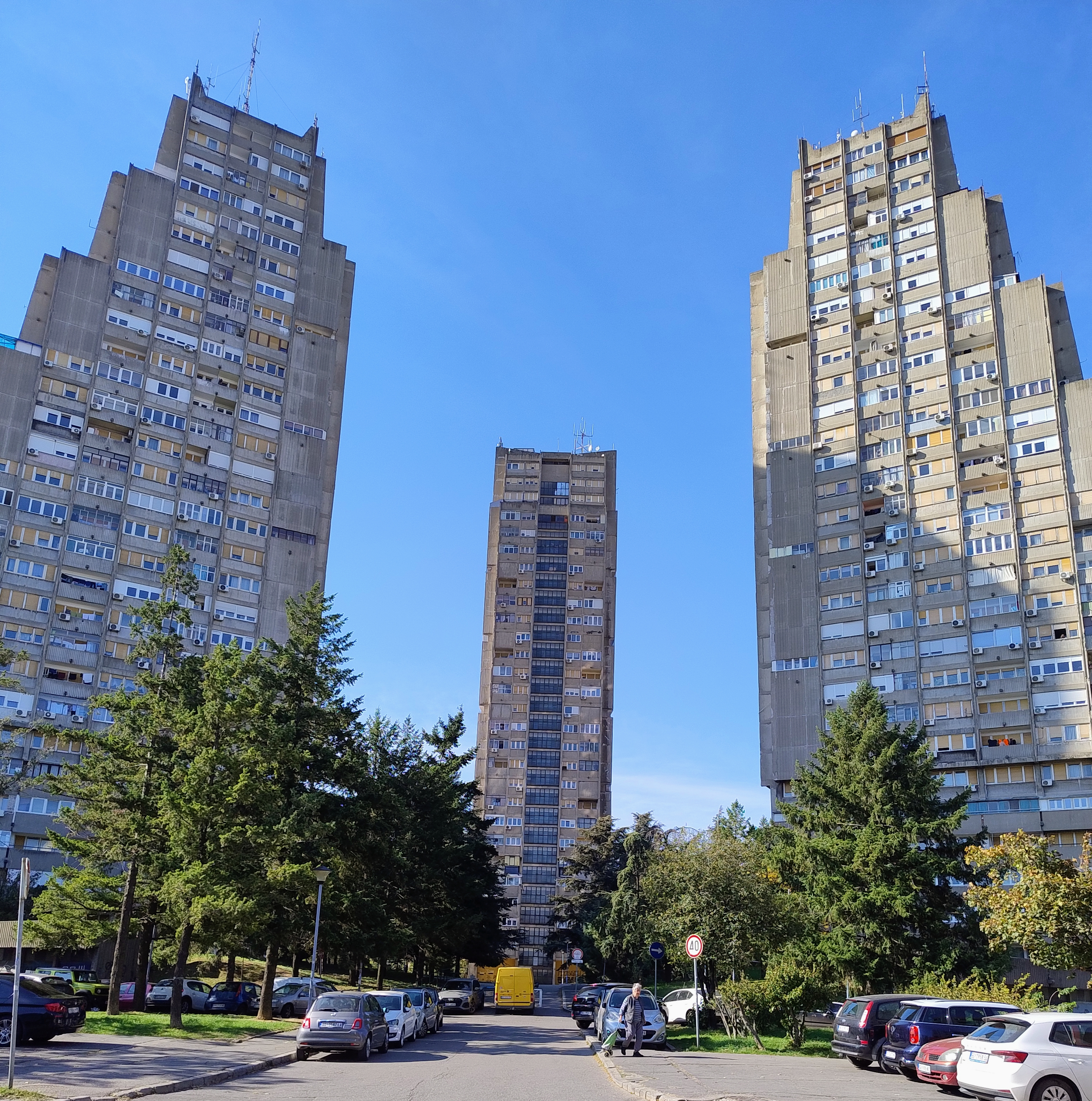
Eastern Gate (2024)

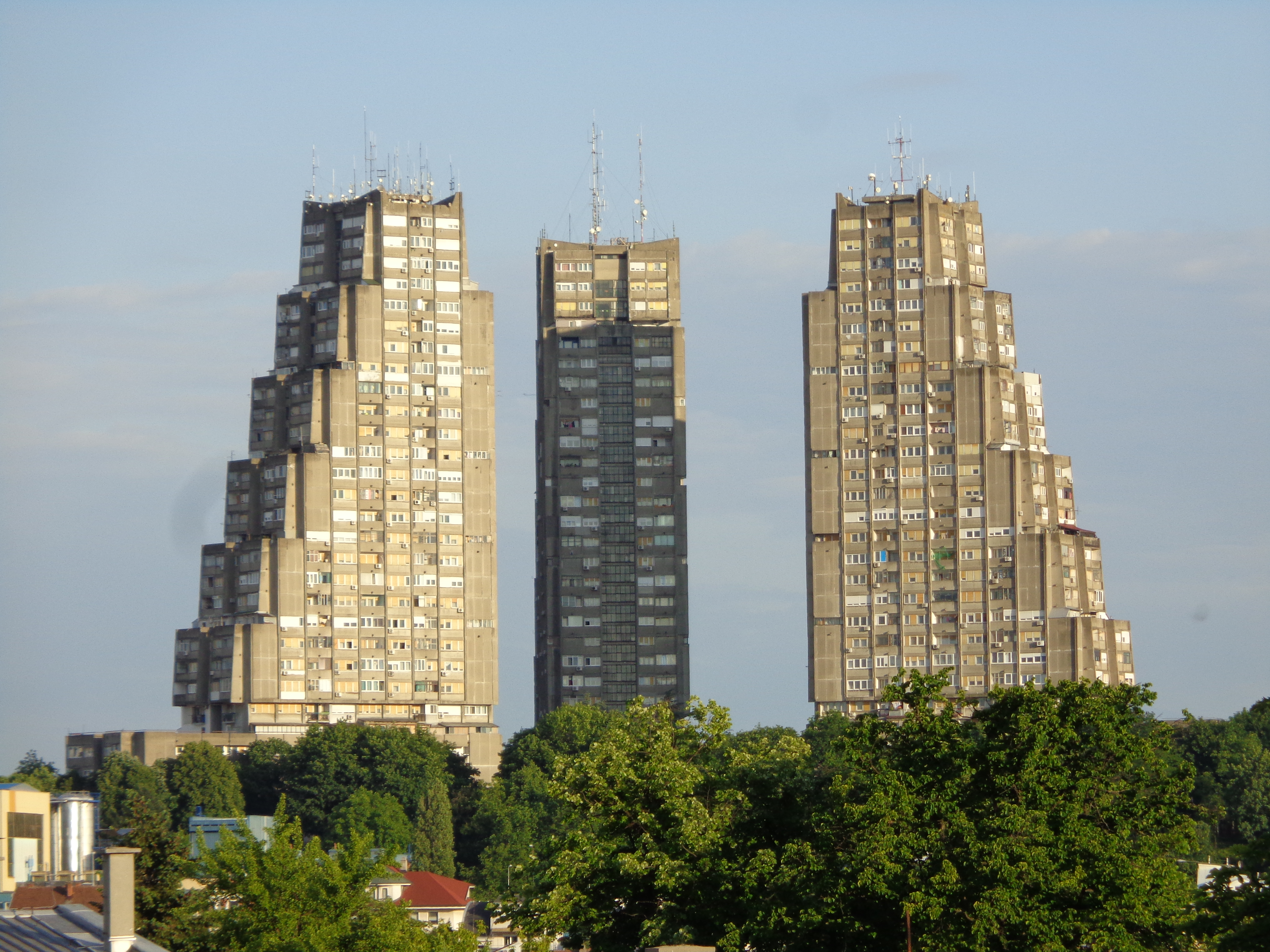
Eastern Gatе

Eastern City Gate of Belgrade оr Istočna Kapija Beograda (Serbian: Источна Капија Београда) is a complex of three large residential buildings situated near the E-75 motorway in Belgrade, the capital of Serbia, and is among the most prominent structures along the Belgrade skyline. The complex, which is officially named Rudo, was finished in 1976 and is considered one of the symbols of the city, and of the Yugoslav Socialism in general.

Construction of its western complement, the double Western City Gate at the opposite, western end of Belgrade, began first, in 1971, but was finished later, in 1979.

== Location ==
The Eastern Gate is located in the neighborhood of Konjarnik, north of the European route E75, in the municipality of Zvezdara. It is situated in the eastern extension of the neighborhood, between Učiteljsko Naselje and Mali Mokri Lug.

== Architecture ==
Eastern Gate was constructed from 1973 to 1976. The buildings were designed by architect Vera Ćirković and civil engineer Milutin Jerotijević. The urban design of the complex was drafted by Milica Jakšić. Dragoljub Mićović performed professional supervision during the construction, who also named them after his hometown of Rudo. The complex consists of three buildings and each of them has 28 storeys and 190 apartments. They are 85 m (279 ft) tall each. Just like its western counterpart, the Western City Gate, it was built in the brutalist style.

By the late 1980s, there were 1,500 residents in the complex. Just as with its western counterpart, the problems with living in the buildings turned out to be numerous, as the concept turned out not to be resident friendly. This prompted a question whether people should live in the buildings designed as the symbols and landmarks.

All three buildings are step-like and triangular shaped, built in a circle so it always visually appears that one is between the other two. Buildings, styled Rudo 1, Rudo 2 and Rudo 3, were settled in 1976, but never fully completed, as the facade wasn't finished. Since the 1990s, due to the lack of maintenance, buildings were known for elevator and water pumps problems. Partial repairs began in 2001, continued in 2004 and intensified in May 2008, mostly concerning the elevators, pumps and terraces.

In 2010, the tenants began collecting funds for the further repairs and in 2012 they started an initiative to fix the problems with the facades. By 2013, concrete chunks up to 60 kg (130 lb) began to fall off the buildings. Experts from the University of Belgrade Faculty of Civil Engineering described the facade as being in "extremely bad shape". It was estimated that to repair the facade to modern standards it would cost €4 million. The plain, classical façade alone would cost €2 million, as it covers an area of 30,000 m^{2} (320,000 sq ft) and special, high cranes and scaffolds, up to 80 m (260 ft) tall, will be needed. By that point, the tenants and the municipality collected only €110,000. They also had talks with the state government, but they refused to allow the construction of the plain facade as the energy efficient one is obligatory by the new laws.

== See also ==
- Gates of Belgrade
- List of Brutalist structures
