= Miković =

Miković is a South Slavic patronymic surname derived form the given name Miko. Notable people with the surname include:

- Milija Miković
- Srđan Miković

== See also ==
- Mikovič
- Mićović
- Mikovits
