= Paviljoni =

Paviljoni Павиљони
- Urban neighbourhood
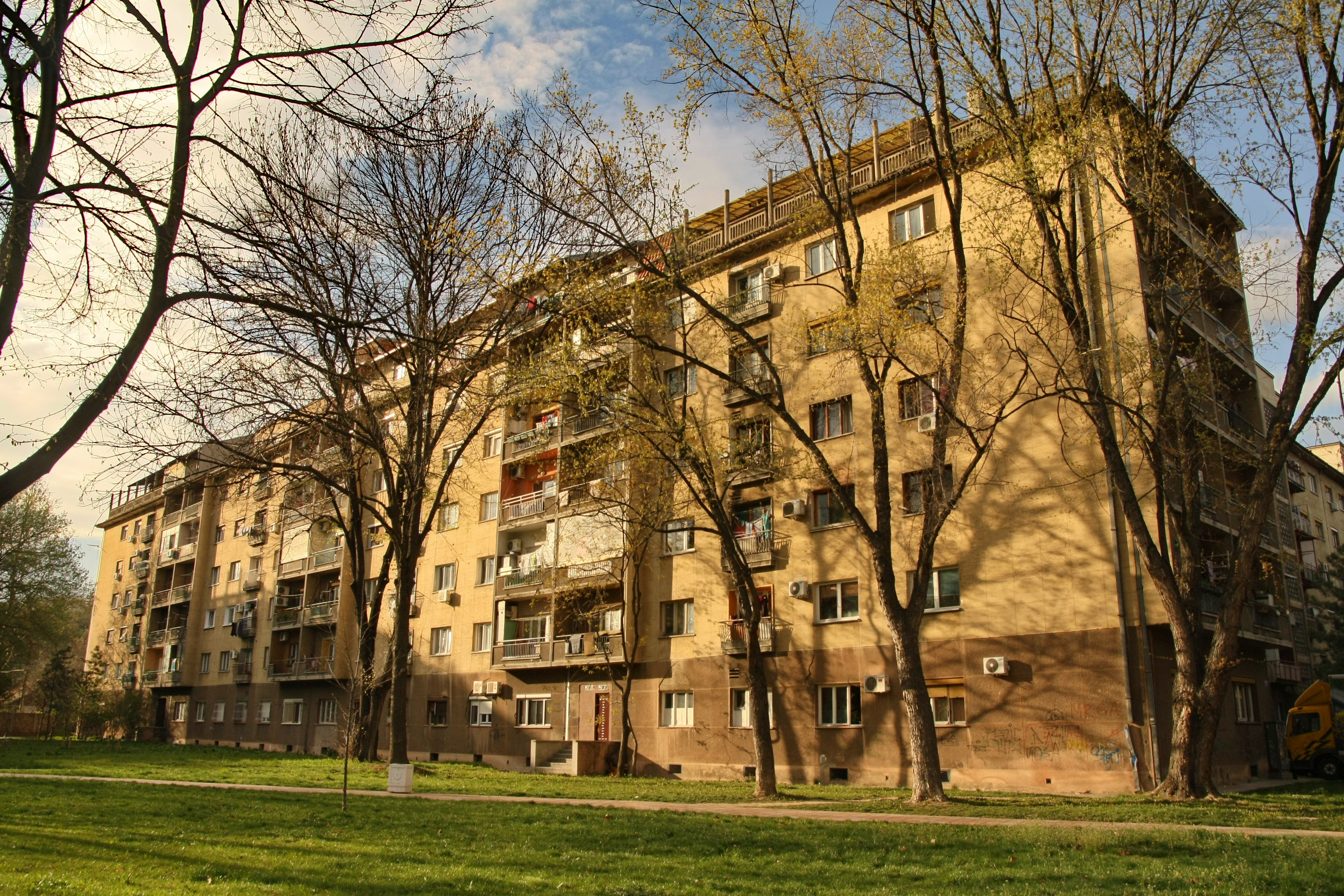
- Paviljoni

- Location within Belgrade
- Coordinates: 44°49′57″N 20°24′19″E
- Country: Serbia
- Region: Belgrade
- Municipality: New Belgrade

Area
  - Total: 0.53 km^{2} (0.20 sq mi)
- Time zone: UTC+1 (CET)
  - Summer (DST): UTC+2 (CEST)
- Area code: +381(0)11
- Car plates: BG

Paviljoni (Serbian Cyrillic: Павиљони, meaning "pavilions") is an urban neighborhood of Belgrade, the capital of Serbia. It is located in New Belgrade.

== Location ==
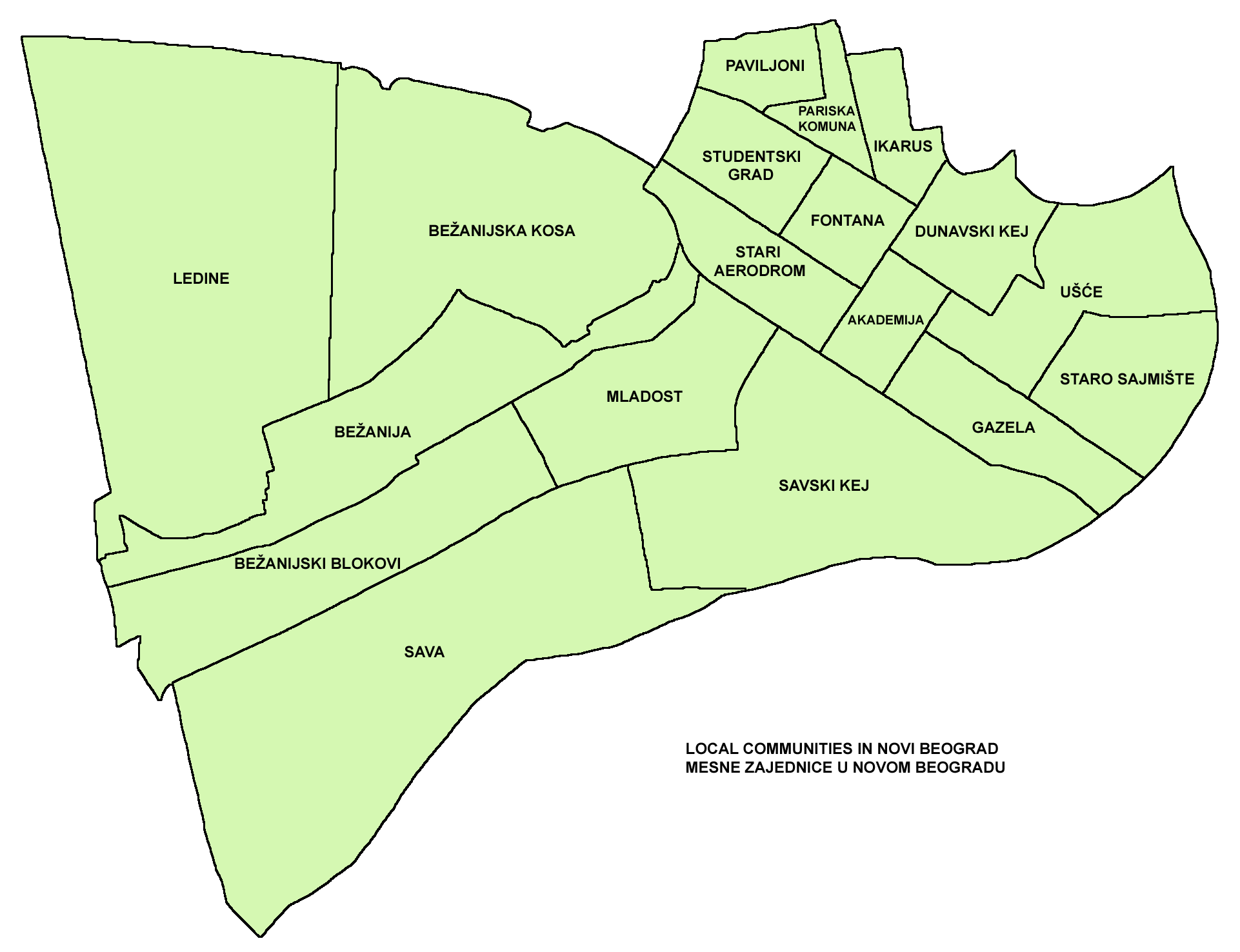
Map of Local communities in Novi Beograd

Paviljoni is located in the northernmost part of the municipality of Novi Beograd, on the border with the municipality of Zemun. It borders the neighborhood of Retenzija on the east, Fontana in the south, Tošin Bunar in the west and Zemun in the north. It is bounded by the streets of Goce Delčev on the south, Radoja Dakića on the west, Jerneja Kopitara on the north and Boulevard of Mihailo Pupin in the east.

== Administration ==
Paviljoni constitutes a local community (mesna zajednica), sub-municipal administrative unit within the municipality of Novi Beograd. It occupies residential blocks number 5, 7, 7-a, 8 and 8-a. Built in the 1950-1960 period, it is the oldest sections of Novi Beograd (construction began in 1948). According to the censuses, local community of Paviljoni had a population of 9,248 in 2002 and 7,900 in 2011. Neighborhood's name is Serbian for "the pavilions".

== Characteristics ==
Central, inner squares of the blocks were arranged like parks. This includes central parks in blocks 7 (0.39 hectares (0.96 acres)) and 8-a (0.34 hectares (0.84 acres)). In May 2011, a green area in Block 8-a was named Lukićev gaj (Lukić's grove) after one of the most famous Serbian children's poet, Dragan Lukić, who lived nearby and died in 2006. Area was reconstructed and new Lombardy poplars were planted. The mini-park covers an area of 500 m^{2} (5,400 sq ft).

When hydroelectrical plant Đerdap I began to fill its reservoir in the late 1960s, due to the backwater of the Danube, underground waters in Zemun and New Belegrade got elevated and the cellars of the buildings in the Paviljoni got flooded. When Đerdap II was finished in 1984, foundations of the number of buildings got permanently under water. It was only in 2009 that the drainage pipes were conducted underground which bring water into the sewage system.

One of the major children's hospitals in Belgrade, Institute for Mother and Child, was built at 6-8 Radoja Dakića Street, in 1959-1960. The building was designed by Radivoj Gibarac. Right across the Bulevar Maršala Tolbuhina, and southern border of the neighborhood, is the Ninth Belgrade Gymnasium. The school was founded in 1961 and moved to its present location in 1964.

The thin, elongated building which spans the entire Block 8 in the north-south direction, has become known as "Chinese Wall" due to its shape. The building was finished in 1964. Between the building and the Boulevard of Mihailo Pupin is the one-floor commercial building "Centrotekstil". In January 2022, it was announced that instead of "Centrotekstil", two massive, conjoined, 8-floors buildings will be built. Residents of "Chinese Wall" organized protests against the structure which they claimed would wall-off their building and cause many other communal problems. Protests were joined by the residents from other neighborhoods, and some citizens' organizations. City responded with the claim the project of the new building will be rejected.
