= Mihajlo Mitrović =

Serbian architect (1921–2018)

Mihajlo Mitrović (Serbian Cyrillic: Михајло Митровић; 1 September 1922 − 20 December 2018) was a Serbian and Yugoslavian architect, urbanist, author and architecture critic. He was a professor at the Faculty of Applied Arts in Belgrade. During his lengthy career, he designed more than 170 structures. His best well known designs are the Western City Gate and the Church of St. Basil of Ostrog, both in New Belgrade. As urbanist, he was the chief author of the general urbanistic projects of Zaječar, Trstenik, Pirot, Niš, Banja Koviljača, Lazarevac and Vrnjačka Banja.

== Biography ==
Mitrović was born in Čačak, Kingdom of Serbs, Croats and Slovenes on 1 September 1922 to wealthy parents who owned a hotel in the city center. He graduated from the University of Belgrade Faculty of Architecture in 1948. In 1950, he received United Nations Scholarship to continue studies in France and Denmark. His first job was in the Urban Institute of Serbia as a chief urbanist. There, he was the chief author of the general urbanistic projects of Zaječar, Trstenik, Pirot, Niš, Banja Koviljača, Lazarevac and Vrnjačka Banja.

In 1961, Mitrović established the "Projektbiro" company for architectural design in Belgrade, where he stayed until 1980. In 1980, he became the full professor at the Faculty of Applied Arts in Belgrade. Mitrović published numerous books about architecture, urbanism and cultural heritage of Belgrade and Serbia. He was an avid architecture critic. He wrote regular weekly critics for Politika for 55 years. He also frequently wrote for NIN weekly.

== Gallery of works ==
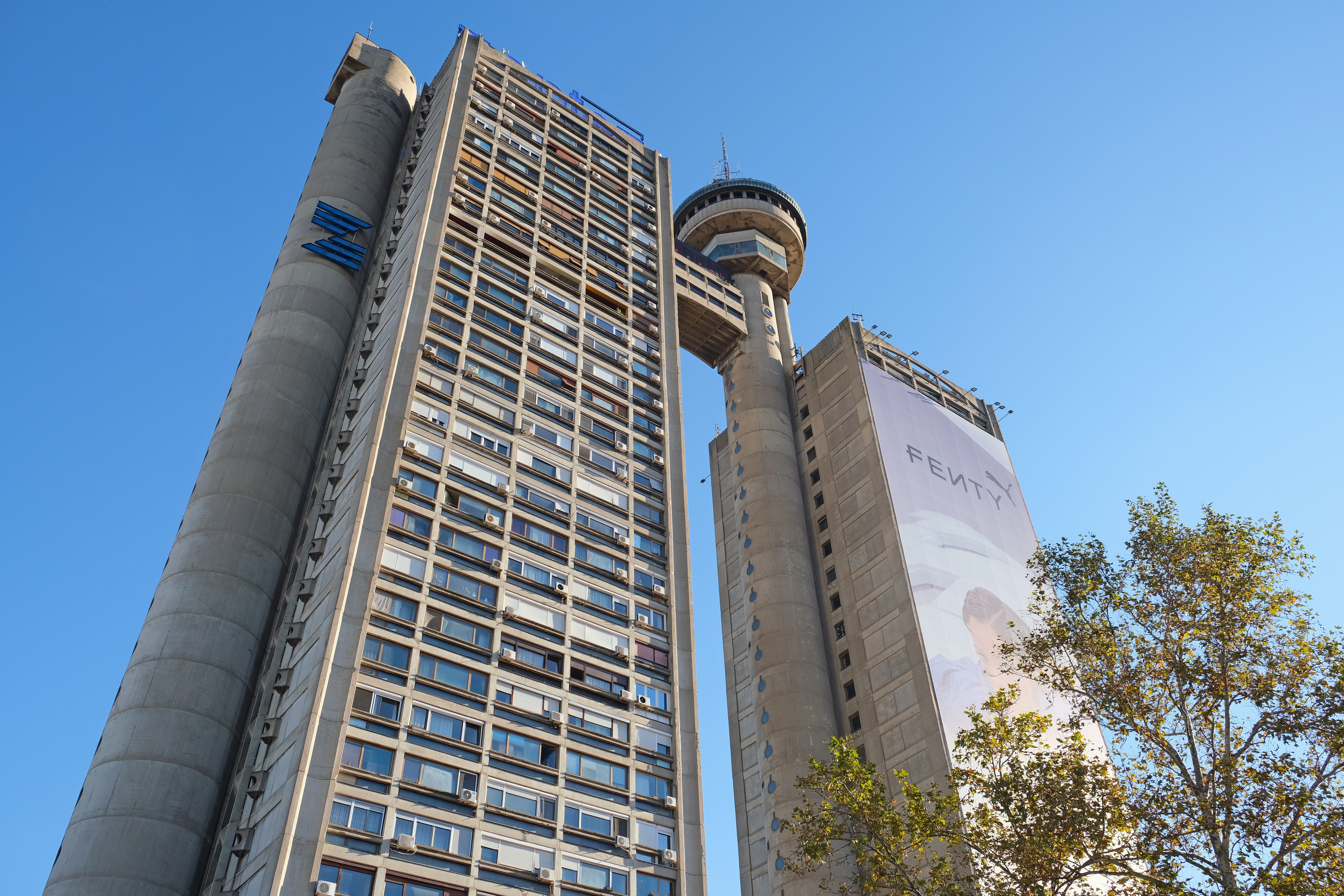
Western City Gate

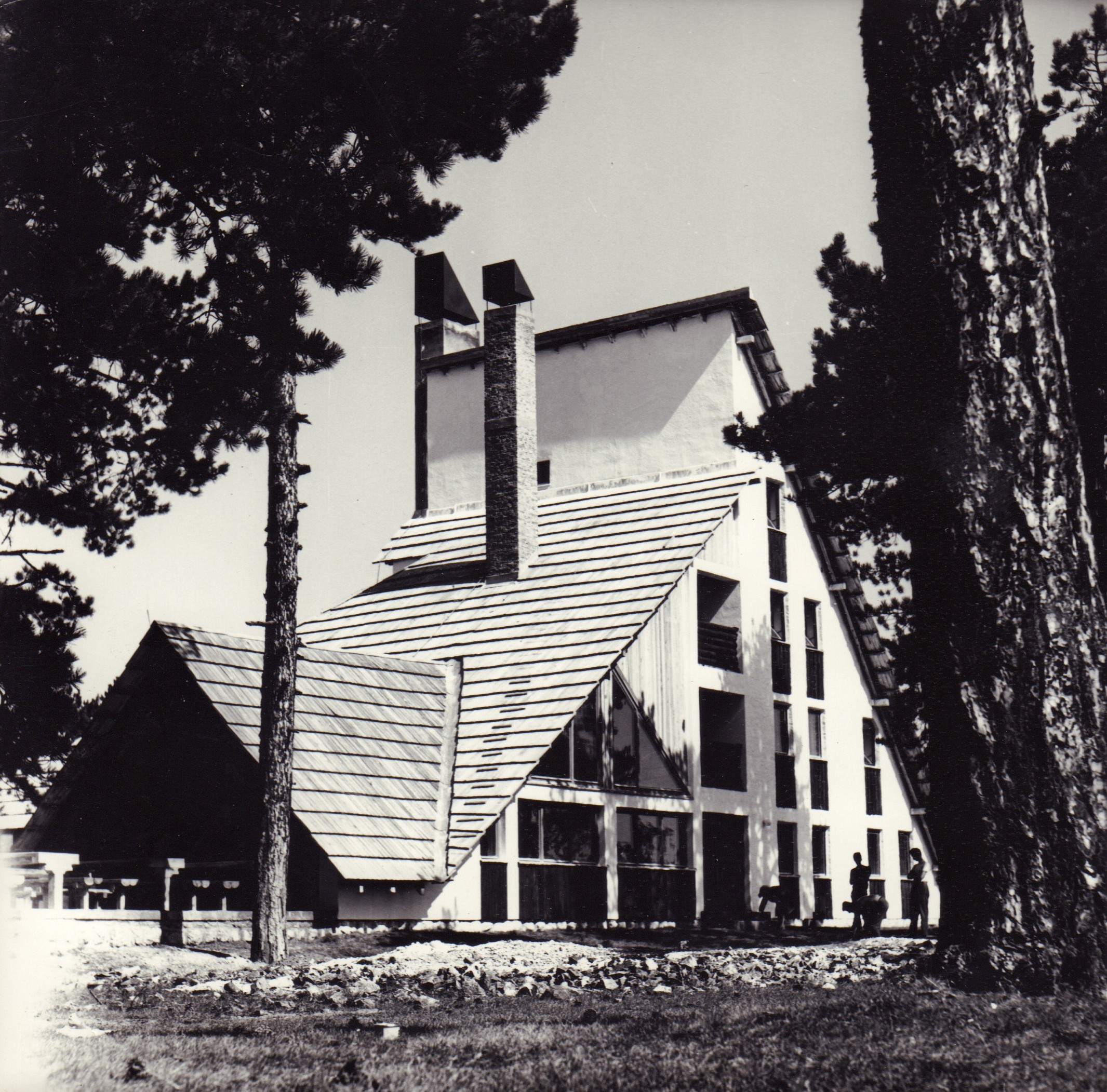
Resort on Tara designed by Mihajlo Mitrović

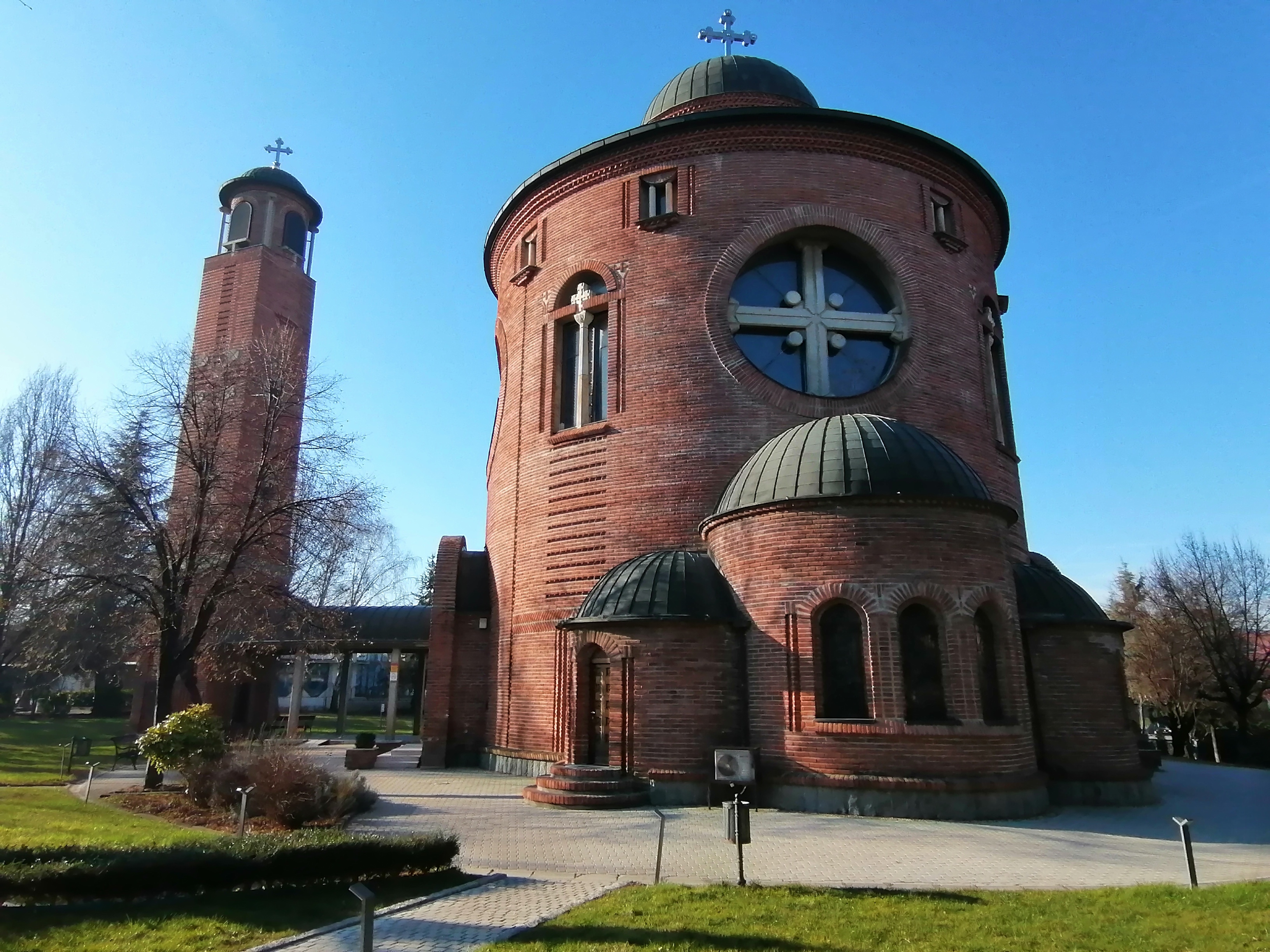
Church of St. Basil of Ostrog, Belgrade
