= Fontana, Belgrade =

Fontana, Belgrade Фонтана
- Urban neighbourhood
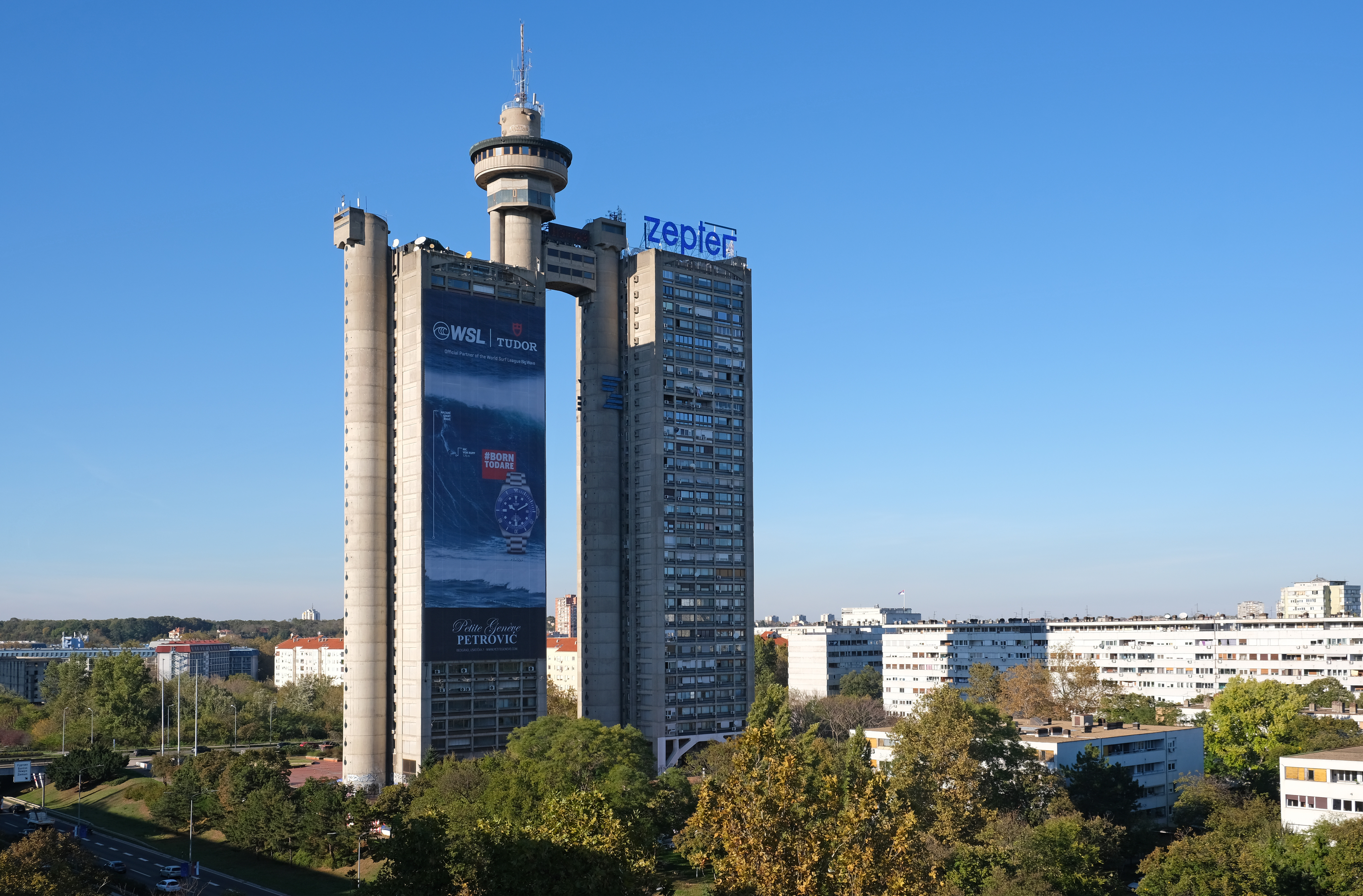
- A 35-storey Western City Gate in the southwest section of the Fontana local community

- Location within Belgrade
- Coordinates: 44.825438°N 20.409033°E
- Country: Serbia
- Region: Belgrade
- Municipality: New Belgrade

Population (2011)
  - Total: 7,849
- Time zone: UTC+1 (CET)
  - Summer (DST): UTC+2 (CEST)
- Area code: +381(0)11
- Car plates: BG

Fontana (Serbian: Фонтана) is an urban neighborhood of Belgrade, the capital of Serbia. It is located in the municipality of New Belgrade.

== Location ==
Fontana sprawls around the intersection of Pariske Komune, Narodnih heroja and Otona Župančiča streets, in the north-central section of the municipality. In the north, it extends into the neighborhood of Paviljoni, and in the west into Tošin Bunar. The local community of Fontana, sub-municipal administrative unit, covers a square shaped area bounded by the streets Pariske Komune and Bulevar Mihajla Pupina on the north, Bulevar Umetnosti on the east, Bulevar Arsenija Čarnojevića on the south and Narodnih heroja on the west. It occupies the blocks No. 1 (where the Fontana Complex itself is situated), 31, 32 and 33.

Map of Local communities in Novi Beograd

== Population ==
Historical population
Year	Pop.	±%
1981	10,586	—
1991	10,424	−1.5%
2002	8,754	−16.0%
2011	7,849	−10.3%

Local communities of Fontana (formerly "25th May") and Zapadna Kapija (formerly "Sutjeska") were merged into one local community named Fontana for the 2011 census. According to the censuses, the population of local communities Fontana and Zapadna Kapija was 5,519 and 5,067 in 1981, 5,237 and 5,187 in 1991 and 4,476 and 4,278 in 2002, respectively. Unified Fontana had a population of 7,849 in 2011.

== History ==
When the plans were made for New Belgrade, the territory was divided in blocks, each one with assigned number. The first blocks, 1 and 2, became core of the future Fontana. They were designed by architect Branko Petričić (1911–1984). He worked with Le Corbusier and accepted his idea of Ville Radieuse, which he applied in the Fontana's design. He also used the "Žeželj method" of construction for the first time. Devised by engineer Branko Žeželj, it incorporated construction with the prefabricated modular elements made of reinforced concrete.

In March 2008, city government announced complete reconstruction of Block 1, including the old shopping complex "Fontana", which at the time of construction was unofficial center of Novi Beograd. Reconstruction should be finished by the end of 2008, and it should include building of a public underground garage, renovation of the children playgrounds, green areas, fountain and ground level of "Fontana" center. Originally, city planned to build overground garage, but after the protests of the local population, idea was changed. As for the "Fontana" center itself, it will be reconstructed under the supervision of the Institute for the protection of cultural monuments, because complex is considered to be a representative of the modern Serbian architecture.

However, the reconstruction began only in September 2010 and the phase I was finished by May 2011. In phase II, the cinema was restored and opened on 8 March 2012 with the Festival of Francophone films.

== Characteristics ==
Apart from being a residential area, some commercial and educational facilities are located nearby, the most prominent being a multifunctional shopping and cultural center "Fontana" by architect Uroš Martinović (1918–2004). Finished in 1968, it was considered an "architectural wonder" at the time. It contained a popular cinema "Fontana", which was closed in 1991.

In the neighborhood there are also a McDonald's restaurant, indoor arena Ranko Žeravica Sports Hall with an outdoor stadium, four kindergartens, three elementary schools (school "Duško Radović", established in 1961), and two high schools (Graphic Design Secondary School and IX Belgrade Gymnasium). Fontana is well-connected to the other parts of Belgrade as over ten lines of public transportation pass through the neighborhood.

One of the tallest buildings in Belgrade, the Western City Gate, is located within the local community, southwest of the Fontana itself, at the corner of the Narodnih Heroja Street and the Boulevard of Arsenije Čarnojević. In September 2021, it was announced that another skyscraper will be built in the opposite corner of the local community. At the corner of the Boulevard of Zoran Đinđić and the Boulevard of Arts, the building of the Alta Bank (better known as the Jubmes Bank Building), will be demolished and the 120 metres (390 ft) tall skyscraper should be built instead. In August 2022 the height was reduced to 100 metres (330 ft), with addition of the adjoining, three times shorter, commercial building. The city officially allowed construction of the 100 m (330 ft) buildings in the Block 20 in September 2023. A station of the future Belgrade Metro is also planned on this location.

In August 2021 it was announced that city's Institute for the Cultural Monuments' Protection is conducting a study on protecting Blocks 1 and 2 as the spatial cultural-historical unit.

Main features in local community's blocks include:

Block 1

- Fontana complex
- Elementary school "Duško Radović"
- Kindergarten "Naša radost"

Block 31

- New Belgrade's municipal hall
- New Belgrade police station
- Serbian Paralympics Committee headquarters
- Yugoimport SDPR weapon manufacturer
- SIV 2 business and administrative building
- SIV 3 business and administrative building
- Mercator Center Belgrade

Block 32

- Church of the Holy Great-Martyr Demetrius
- Serbian State Retirement Fund
- Embassy of Slovakia
- Telekom Srbija
- exit from the Belgrade-Zagreb motorway/European route E70

Block 33

- Western City Gate
- Kindergarten "Poletarac"
- FK Novi Beograd football pitch

== Protection ==
The original Fontana Complex, located at 13 Pariske Komune street, has been placed under the preliminary state protection, as the prospective cultural monument.

The entire area of Block 1, with the adjoining Block 2 to the north, has also been placed under the preliminary protection as the Spatial Cultural-Historical Unit
