= Marica Josimčević =

Serbian writer (b. 1946)

Marica Josimčević (Serbian-Cyrillic: Марица Јосимчевић; born 12 May 1946 in Belgrade, SFR Yugoslavia) is a Serbian writer and translator.

== Biography ==
Marica Josimčević grew up in his native place, attended the Ninth Belgrade Gymnasium in New Belgrade city quarter and graduated with maturity diploma in 1965, then she began studying Spanish and English languages and literatures at the Philosophical Faculty of Belgrade's University and graduated with diploma in 1969. After her studies, she worked as translator for Aviogenex (1970–73) and Energoprojekt (1973-1980). During these years, she travelled to Latin America and spent some time in Colombia (1973), Panama (1974) and Mexico (1980). She started her career as freelance writer in 1980, and from 1993 to 2001, she worked as literary editor for the publishing companies DBR and Verzal Press in Belgrade, which no longer exist today. Josimčević is one of the editors, who compiled the complete works of Isidora Sekulić, first edited by Stylos publishing Novi Sad from 2001-2004, she is translator of works by Mario Vargas Llosa, Samael Aun Weor, Carlos Fuentes, Pío Baroja, Manuel Scorza, Reinaldo Arenas and Rómulo Gallegos as well as the History of Latin American Literature (Historia de la literatura hispanoamericana) by Gerardo Mario Goloboff and Juan Octavio Prenz into Serbian. Josimčević's work is influenced by spiritualism, mysticism, esotericism, symbolism and Magic realism.

== Works ==
- Dno na vrhu sveta (Abyss on Top of the World), novel, DBR Publishing, Belgrade 1994, ISBN 86-7993-001-6.
- Škorpion je znao (Scorpio Knew It), short stories, Prosveta, 1989, ISBN 86-07-00427-1.
- Postaja gospodnja (Retreat of Lord), novel, Altera, Belgrade 1991, ISBN 86-81459-15-5.
- Put kože (Way of Skin), short stories, Srpska književna zadruga, Belgrade 1998, ISBN 86-379-0654-0.
- Jovanje : knjiga o drugom postanju (Jovanje: Book of Second Creation), Pešić i sinovi, Belgrade 2003, ISBN 86-7540-020-9.
- Dvoboj na mostu (Duel on the Bridge) short stories, Utopija, Belgrade 2007, ISBN 978-86-85129-52-0.
- Botaničar : drama u četiri čina, trinaest dana i četrdeset i četiri scene (The Botanist: a drama in four acts, thirteen days and forty-four scenes), novel, Luks Mundi Press, Belgrade 2010, ISBN 978-86-85129-88-9.
- Abyss on Top of the World, English self-publication, CreateSpace Independent Publishing 2009 and 2012, ISBN 978-14-8006-993-0.
- Ogledalo ljudskog roda (Mirror of Mankind), Pešić i sinovi, Belgrade 2013.
- Drezga, monograph (Serbian and English), Radionica duše, Belgrade 2014 and 2016, ISBN 978-86-83385-26-3.
- Plavi zdenac (Blue Well), Metaphysica, Belgrade 2016, ISBN 978-86-7884-193-4.

== Awards ==
- Isidora Sekulić Award 1998 for Put kože
- Stevan Pešić Award 1998 for Put kože
