= Marija Mićović =

Serbian basketball player

Personal information
- Born: 1 October 1982 (age 44) Belgrade, SFR Yugoslavia
- Listed height: 1.88 m (6 ft 2 in)

Career information
- WNBA draft: 2004: undrafted
- Position: Power forward / small forward

Career history
- 2003–2006: Basket Parma
- 2006–2007: Pantere Basket
- 2007–2008: Pallacanestro Ribera
- 2008–2010: Basket Parma
- 2010–2011: Napoli Basket Vomero
- 2011–2012: Basket Spezia Club
- 2012–2014: Basket Ariano Irpino

Marija Mićović (Serbian Cyrillic: Мaриja Мићовић; born 1 October 1982 in Belgrade, SFR Yugoslavia) is a Serbian female basketball player.
