= Milica Mićović =

Serbian basketball player

No. 2 – Reyer Venezia
- Position: Shooting guard / small forward
- League: Serie A1; EuroCup Women

Personal information
- Born: August 24, 1984 (age 42) Mladenovac, SFR Yugoslavia
- Listed height: 1.82 m (6 ft 0 in)

Career information
- WNBA draft: 2006: undrafted

Career history
- 2003–2005: Basket Parma
- 2005–2007: Basket Carugate
- 2007–2008: Libertas Basket Bologna
- 2008–2009: Virtus Viterbo
- 2009–2010: Basket Parma
- 2010–2011: Virtus Eirene Ragusa
- 2011–2012: Pallacanestro Pozzuoli
- 2012–2014: Virtus Eirene Ragusa
- 2014–2015: CUS Cagliari
- 2015–2016: Virtus Eirene Ragusa
- 2016–present: Reyer Venezia

Milica Mićović (Serbian Cyrillic: Милица Мићовић, born 24 August 1984 in Mladenovac, SFR Yugoslavia) is a Serbian female basketball player.
