= Tošin Bunar =

Tošin Bunar Тошин Бунар
- Urban neighbourhood
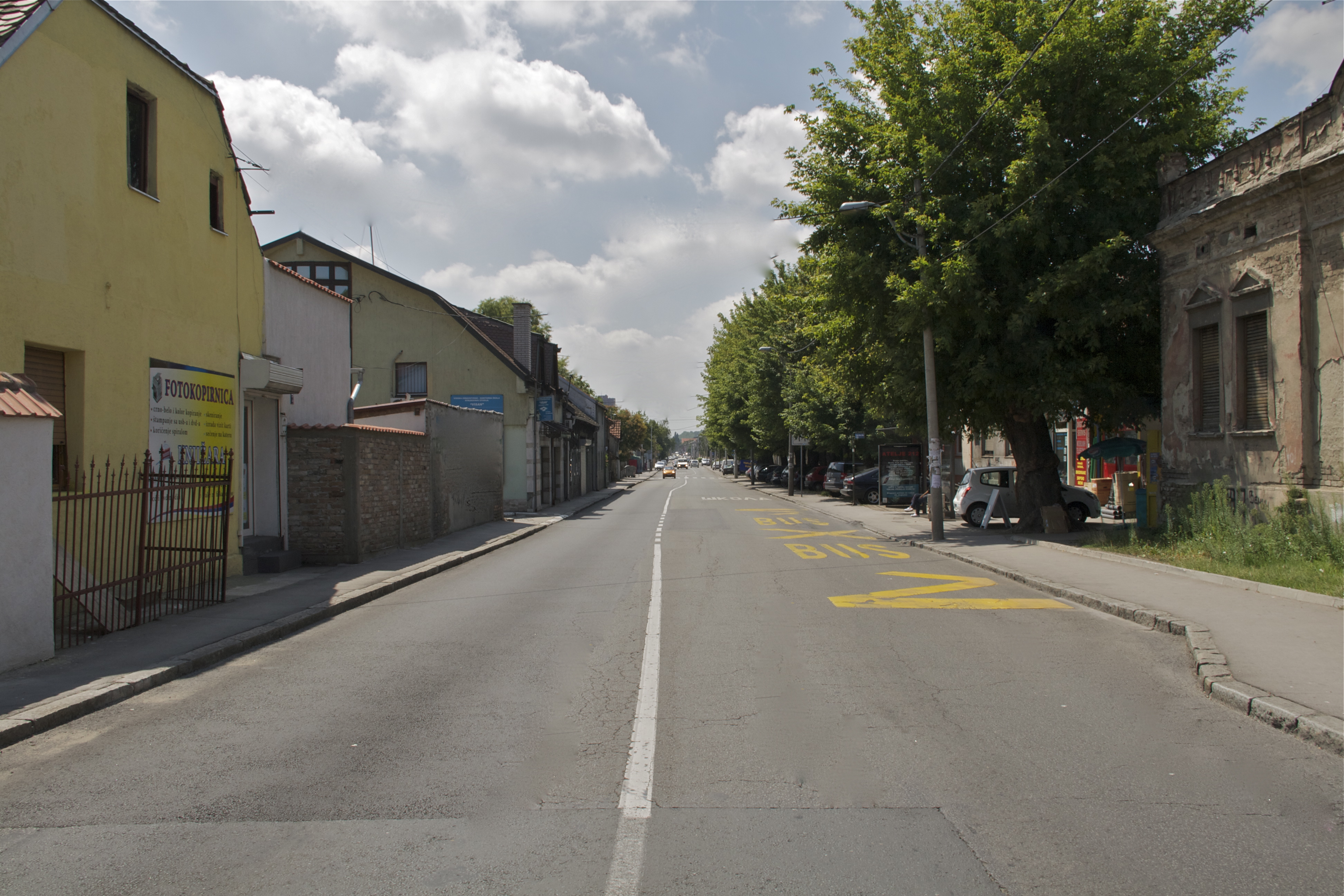
- Tošin Bunar

- Location within Belgrade
- Coordinates: 44°50′N 20°24′E
- Country: Serbia
- Region: Belgrade
- Municipality: New Belgrade
- Time zone: UTC+1 (CET)
  - Summer (DST): UTC+2 (CEST)
- Area code: +381(0)11
- Car plates: BG

Tošin Bunar (Serbian Cyrillic: Тошин Бунар) is an urban neighborhood of Belgrade, the capital of Serbia. It is located in Belgrade's municipalities of New Belgrade and Zemun.

== Location ==
Tošin Bunar generally refers to an area alongside the Tošin Bunar Street, over 3 km (1.9 mi) long meridionally stretched street that connects Bežanija, Novi Beograd and Zemun. It begins at Bežanijska Kosa and also passes between the neighborhoods of Franjine Rudine, Studentski Grad (where it crosses the European route E75 with large interchange), Kalvarija and Paviljoni, while in the end, through the short Ivićeva and Bežanijska streets, it enters the center of Zemun and its neighborhood of Donji Grad.

== History ==
The name, Tošin Bunar, is Serbian for Toša's water well and it was named after Teodor Toša Apostolović (1745–1810), Serbian merchant and philanthropist who donated the land between Bežanija and Zemun to the Serbian church municipality of Zemun. He dug a đeram, cattle-drawn water well, and built a kafana around it. Urban legend claims that Apostolović was losing his eyesight after he turned 50. He was told in a dream that a waters which could heal him are where the good vineyards grow, below the loess ridge of Bežanijska Kosa. He was told to roll the barrel down the hill and where the barrel stops, he should discover a spring and dig a well. He has done so and got healed. Kafana was originally named Tošin Bunar, which later became the name of the street and the neighborhood. Apostolović, originally a Greek named Theodoros Apostolos, built a small meyhane, across the Austrian excise or the customs, which was located where Studentski Grad is today.

The surrounding area was a proper marsh. Originally, only huts for the keepers of the abundant vineyards and gardens existed around kafana and the real settlement began to develop between the two world wars. The settlement, located where Studentski Grad is today, was considered a distant suburbia of Zemun at the time. It was one of the three areas of future New Belgrade which began to urbanize during Interbellum, other two being the Old Airport (see below) and Sajmište. As an informal, peri-urban settlement, it was a shabby, criminal-ridden neighborhood, sort of Zemun's counterpart of Belgrade's Jatagan Mala.

When construction of New Belgrade began in 1948, and of the nearby neighborhood of Paviljoni, the settlement was demolished and modern, long street was constructed, which was divided between the municipalities of New Belgrade and Zemun, connecting the two. When Studentski Grad was built, from 1949 to 1955, the well and the spring were buried. The well was said to be of a đeram type.

=== Dojno Polje Airport ===
East of Bežanija and 2 km (1.2 mi) south of Zemun, between the village and the Sava river, is the location of the old Belgrade airport which was finished in March 1927. The locality was called Dojno Polje. As it is located along the Tošin Bunar Street, though administratively part of the village of Bežanija at the time, the airport is often referred to as both the Bežanija Airport and Airport on Tošin Bunar. Construction of an airfield began in 1923. An initiative asked for the creation of the airline company in 1926 which was approved by the government on 23 March 1926. Then the initial public offering began but largely failed as only 10% of the planned amount was gathered. According to the existing laws, the airline company was to be closed even before it was officially formed. In order to bust the sale of the shares, pilot Tadija Sondermajer decided to conduct the promotional flight Paris-Bombay-Belgrade. With his colleague Leonid Bajdak, he started the journey on 20 April 1927 from Paris, arriving back to Belgrade after 11 days and 14.800 km (9.196 mi), on 8 May. They were awaited as heroes by the crowd of 30,000. The sale of the shares was boosted and in three months there were sufficient funds for the company, named Aeroput and established on 17 June 1927, to purchase its first 4 airplanes.

New administrative building was constructed in 1931 and to celebrate the occasion, a big air show of the biplanes was held. Around the airport, a workers settlement developed. The airport was destroyed by the Germans in 1944, and became defunct in 1962 when the new airport near the village of Surčin was finished (today's Belgrade Nikola Tesla Airport). In April 2016 works began on the construction of the access road to the Ada Bridge. During works on the new boulevard, remnants of the old airport's runway, hangars and warehouses were discovered. The area is today occupied by the modern commercial and business neighborhood of Airport City Belgrade, named so after the old airport, which is generally not considered as part of the Tošin Bunar neighborhood anymore.

== Characteristics ==
As a neighborhood, the name is usually applied for a section on the left side of the street, in Novi Beograd's Block 6, south of Kalvarija. It is a rural-like neighborhood with small residential houses with backyards, which leave an impression of almost being dug into the yellow loess ridge of Bežanijska Kosa, quite visible in this section and whose eastern border the Tošin Bunar street generally follows. It is a contrast to the rest of Novi Beograd, especially coming from the direction of Fontana or Studenski Grad through the Boulevard of Zoran Đinđić and Pariske komune streets (Paris Commune street).

Kafana Tošin Bunar, founded in c1800, still exists though its present building is constructed in c1910. It is located at the crossroads of the Tošin Bunar, Boulevard of Zoran Đinđić and Studentska streets and is administratively in the municipality of New Belgrade. During the time, it became a gathering place for the local youth and after the World War II, while the spring and the well still existed, it was a favorite place for the ′′Prvomajski uranak′′ or "Labour Day early outing". Later, it became the most popular restaurant among the students from the neighboring Studentski Grad. Restaurant was so popular that it has been visited by the President of Yugoslavia Josip Broz Tito, and some of his foreign guests, like the President of Indonesia, Sukarno. The building was reconstructed in 1967, 1996 and, after the fire, in 2012.

Since 2005, the corner of the Tošin Bunar street and the Third Boulevard (Block 37) is in the process of becoming a major commercial area. Third Boulevard for decades was a dead end street as many families had temporary refuge in a barracks remained after the street's construction and disconnecting the two streets. Dispute was settled in 2005 and the Third Boulevard was extended to reach the Tošin Bunar street.
