= Ninth Belgrade Gymnasium =

Ninth Gymnasium "Mihailo Petrović-Alas"
- Девета гимназија "Михајло Петровић-Алас"; Deveta gimnazija "Mihailo Petrović-Alas"
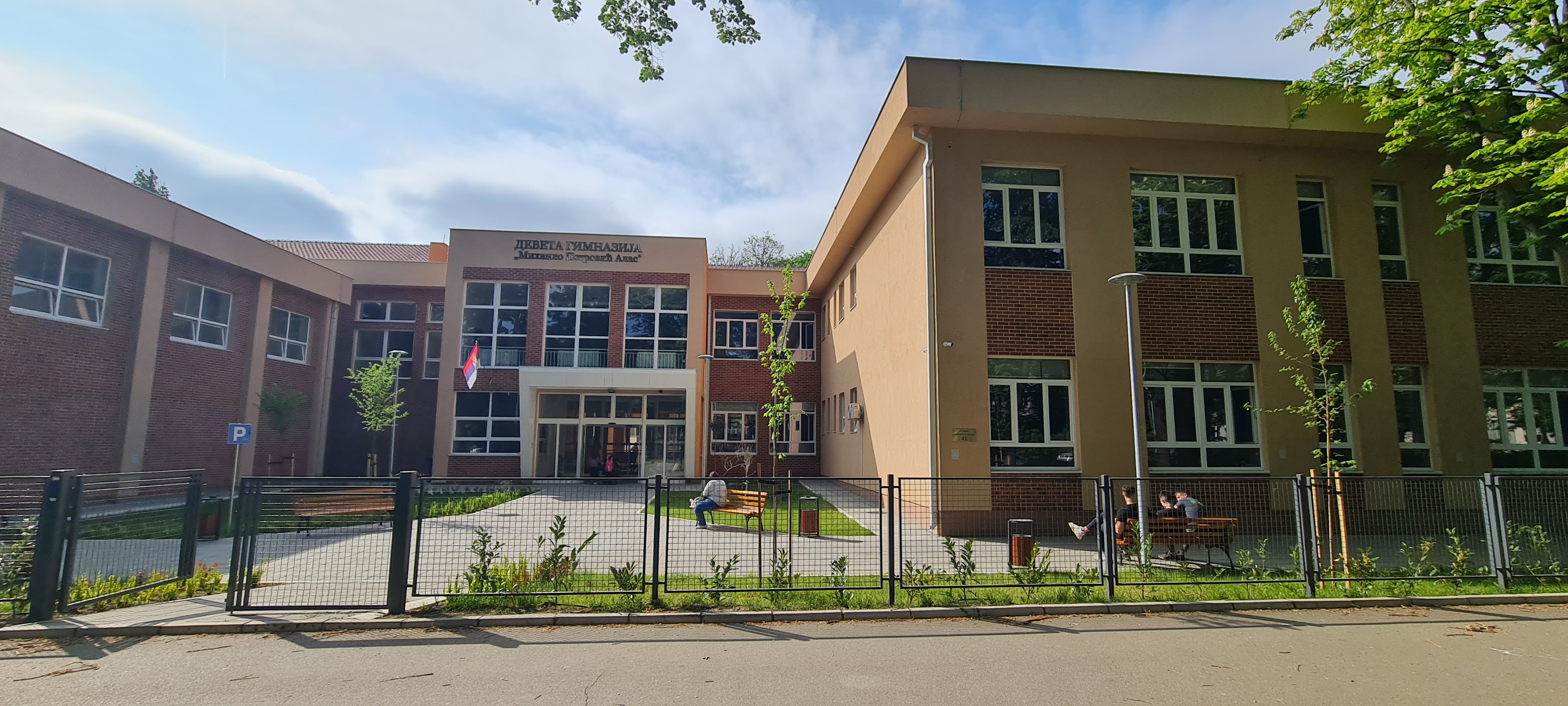
- IX Gymnasium "Mihailo Petrović-Alas",

Location
- New Belgrade, Serbia
- Coordinates: 44.8290°N 20.4025°E

Information
- Type: Gymnasium
- Established: 1961
- Website: www.devetagimnazija.edu.rs

The IX Gymnasium "Mihailo Petrović-Alas" (Serbian: Девета гимназија "Михајло Петровић-Алас", romanized: Deveta gimnazija "Mihailo Petrović-Alas") is a gymnasium located in New Belgrade, Serbia, established in 1961, and named after the Serbian mathematician Mihailo Petrović-Alas.

== Public reputation ==
The school has a reputation of being very academically demanding, with high entry standards: for example, in 2005, an applicant needed a score of at least 96 out of 100 points on the Serbian High school examination to enroll in the school, the highest score of any high school in Belgrade that year.

The school has earned an excellent reputation over many decades and has been called a philosophical school since Đinđić's schooldays because of its liberal-humanistic atmosphere.

A complete reconstruction of the gymnasium was announced in 2021. The reconstruction was finished in August 2023.

== Notable alumni ==
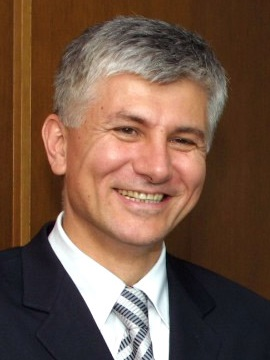
PM Zoran Đinđić attended the school

- Zoran Đinđić, Prime Minister of Serbia 2001-2003
- Dragan Đilas, Mayor of Belgrade
- Čedomir Jovanović, Serbian politician; started his high-school career in the IXth gymnasium, but then transferred to Treća ekonomska school
- Verica Rakocević, fashion designer
- Igor Rakočević, basketball player
- Vanja Bulić, journalist
- Marica Josimčević, writer
- Neda Arnerić, actress
- Ivana Maksimović, sport shooter
- Stefan Arsenijević, Film director
- Saša M.Savić, Artist
- Mihajlo Veruović Voyage, rapper and actor

== Gallery ==
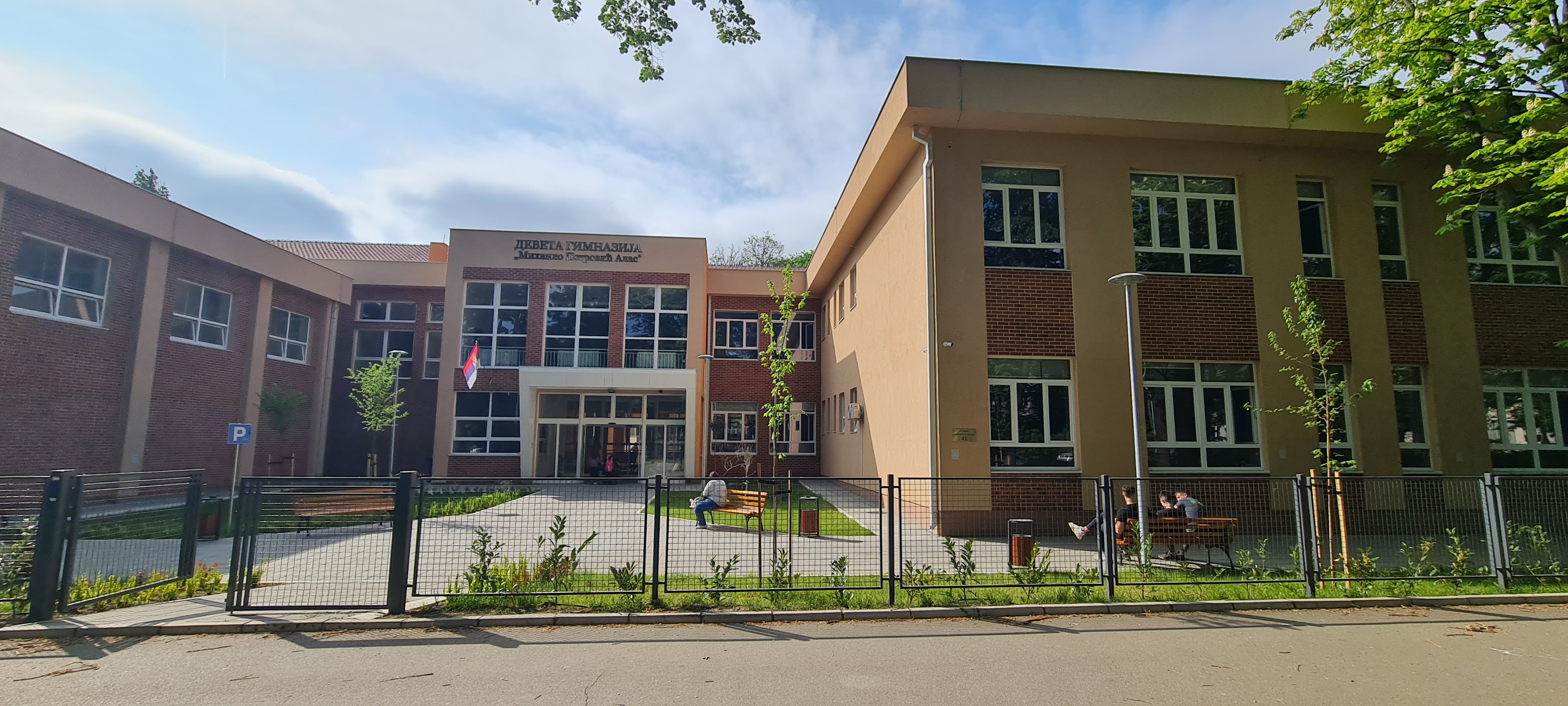
Ninth Belgrade Gymnasium "Mihailo Petrović-Alas"

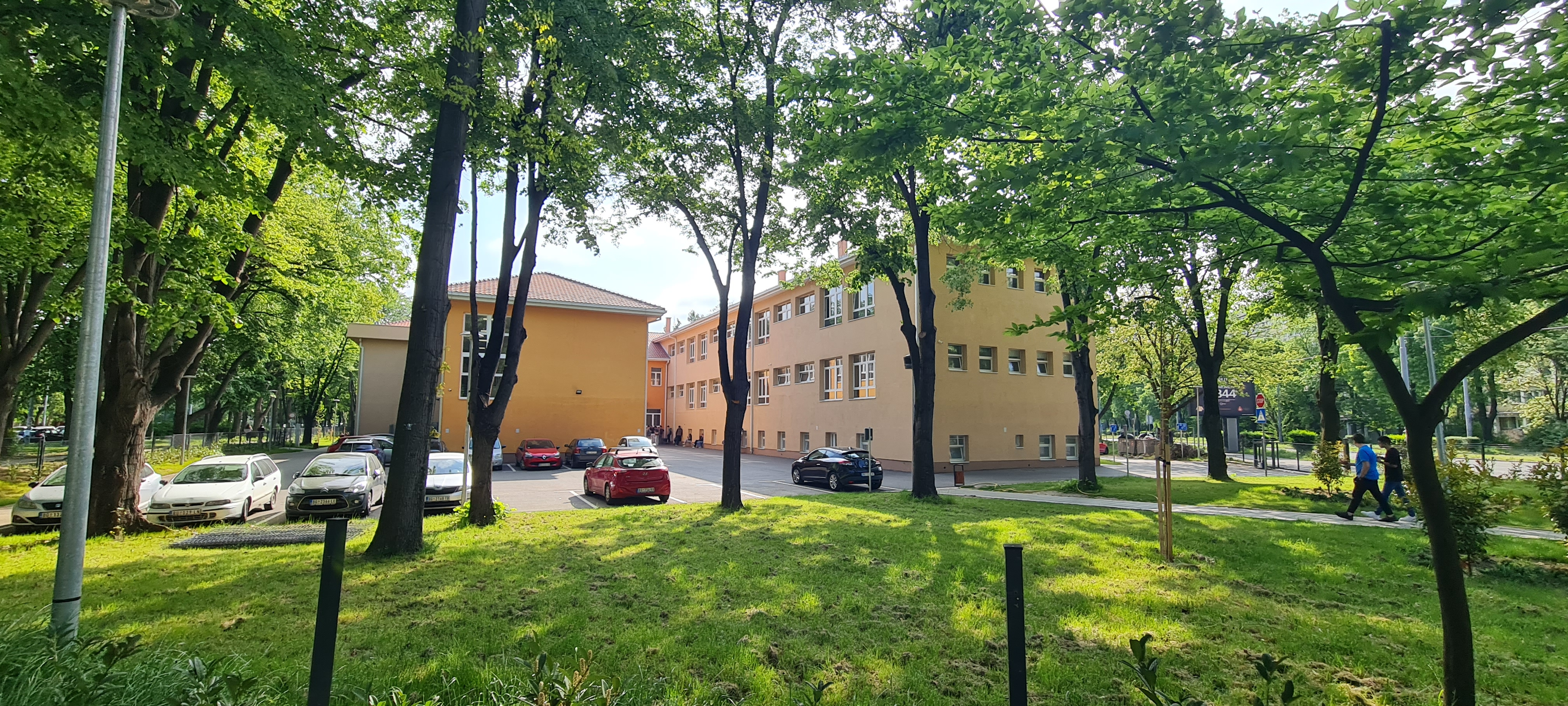
Ninth Belgrade Gymnasium "Mihailo Petrović-Alas"

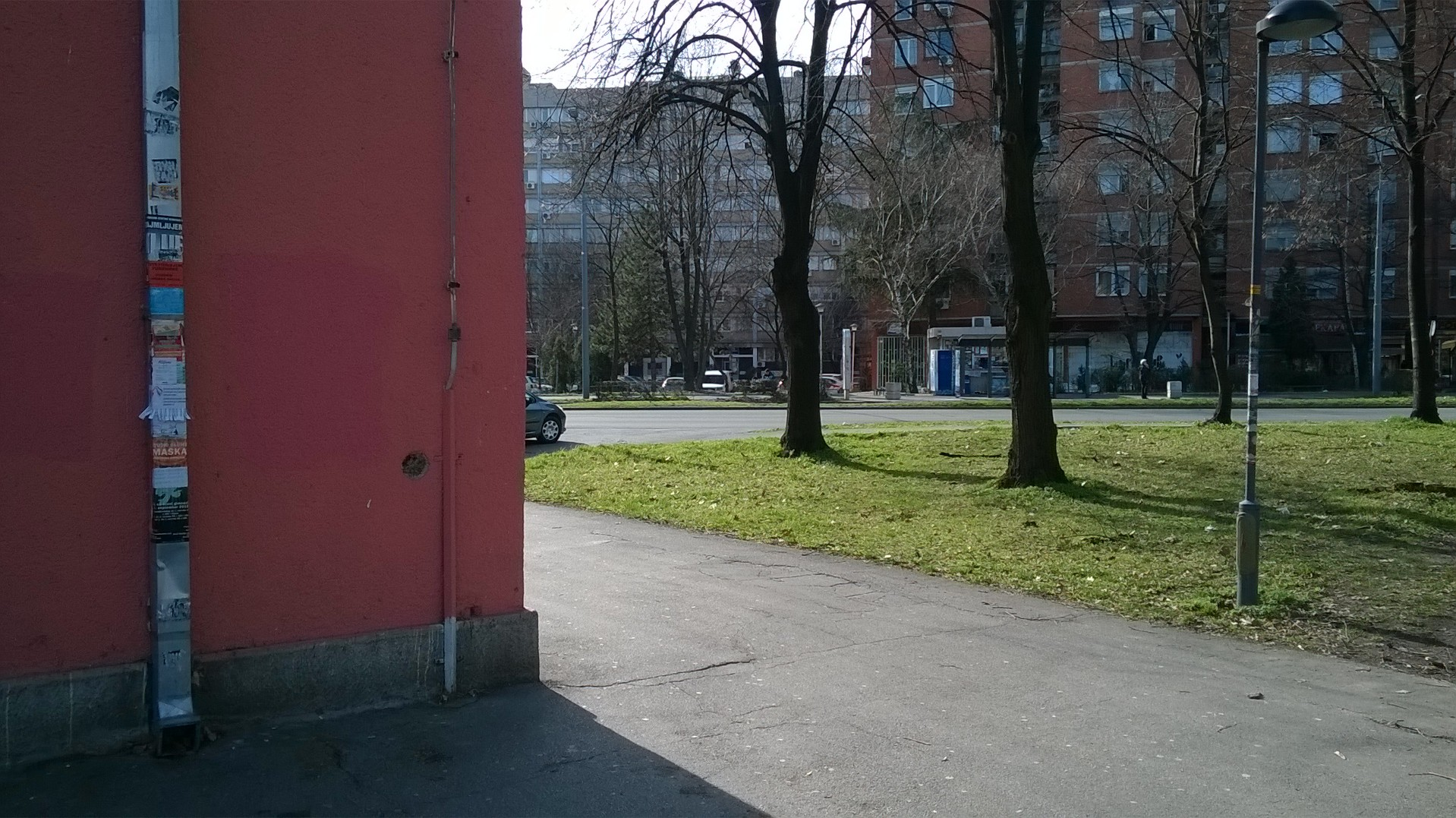
Ninth Belgrade Gymnasium "Mihailo Petrović-Alas" Smk Corner

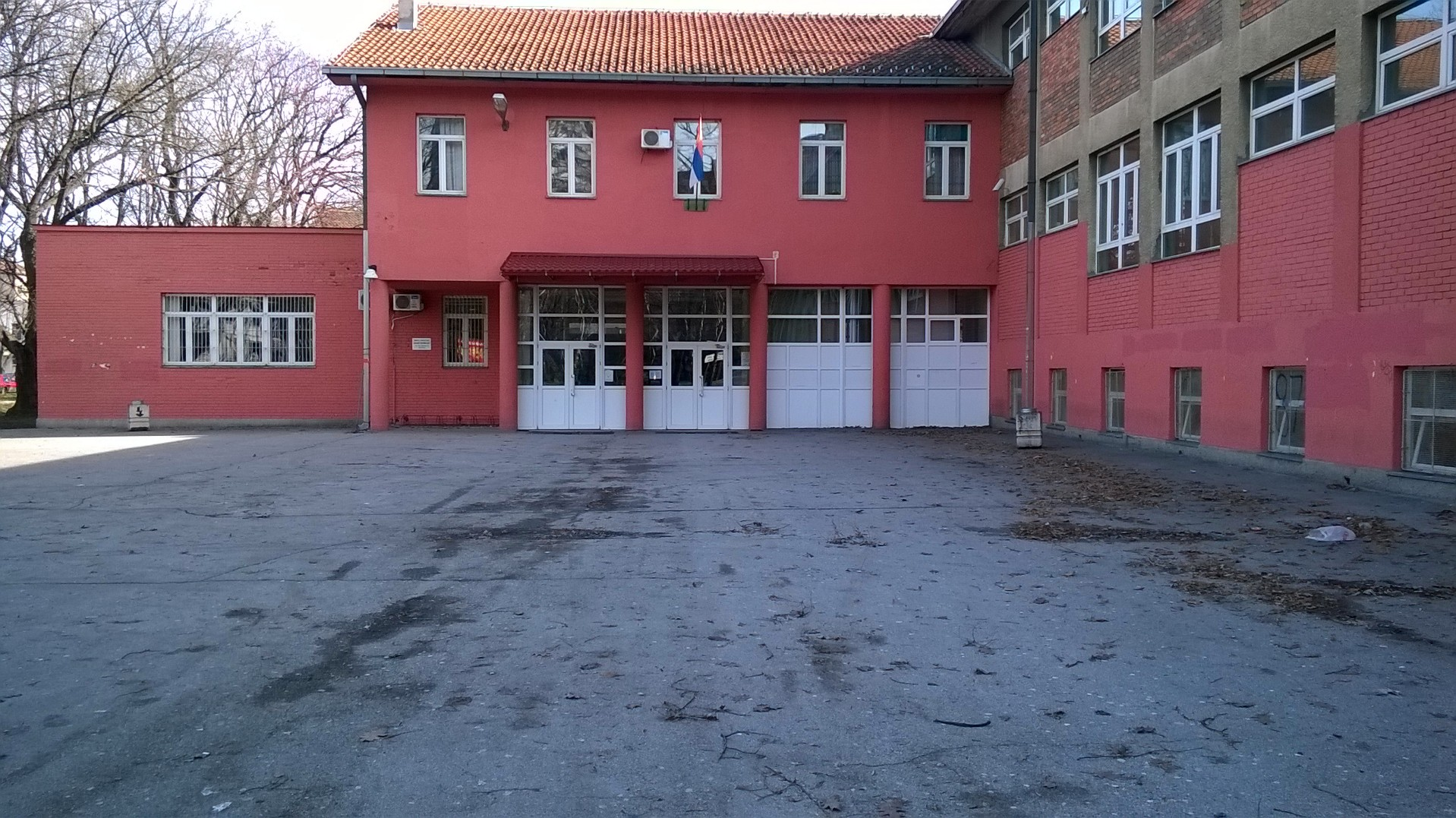
Ninth Belgrade Gymnasium "Mihailo Petrović-Alas" Courtyard

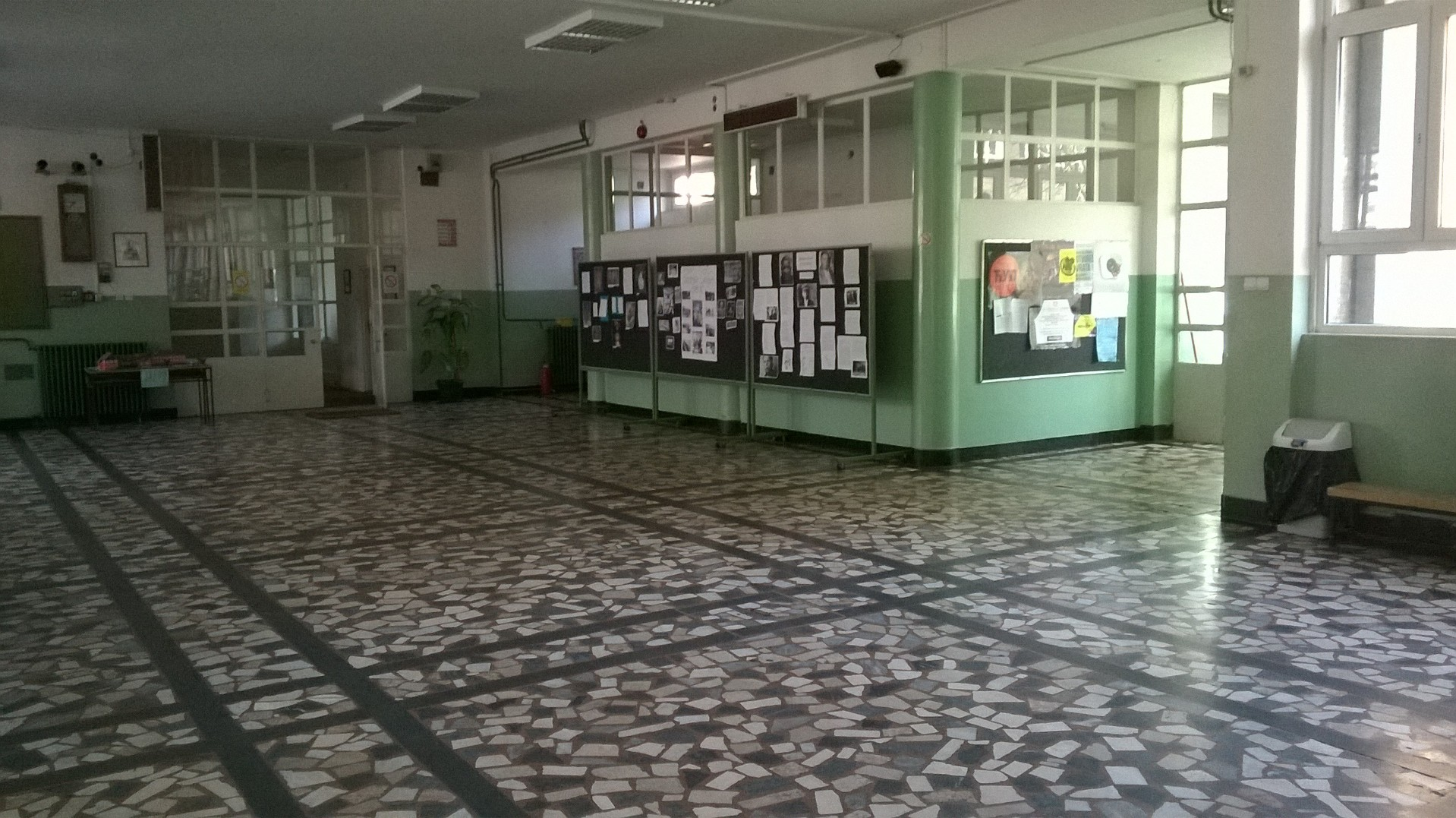
Ninth Belgrade Gymnasium "Mihailo Petrović-Alas" Hall

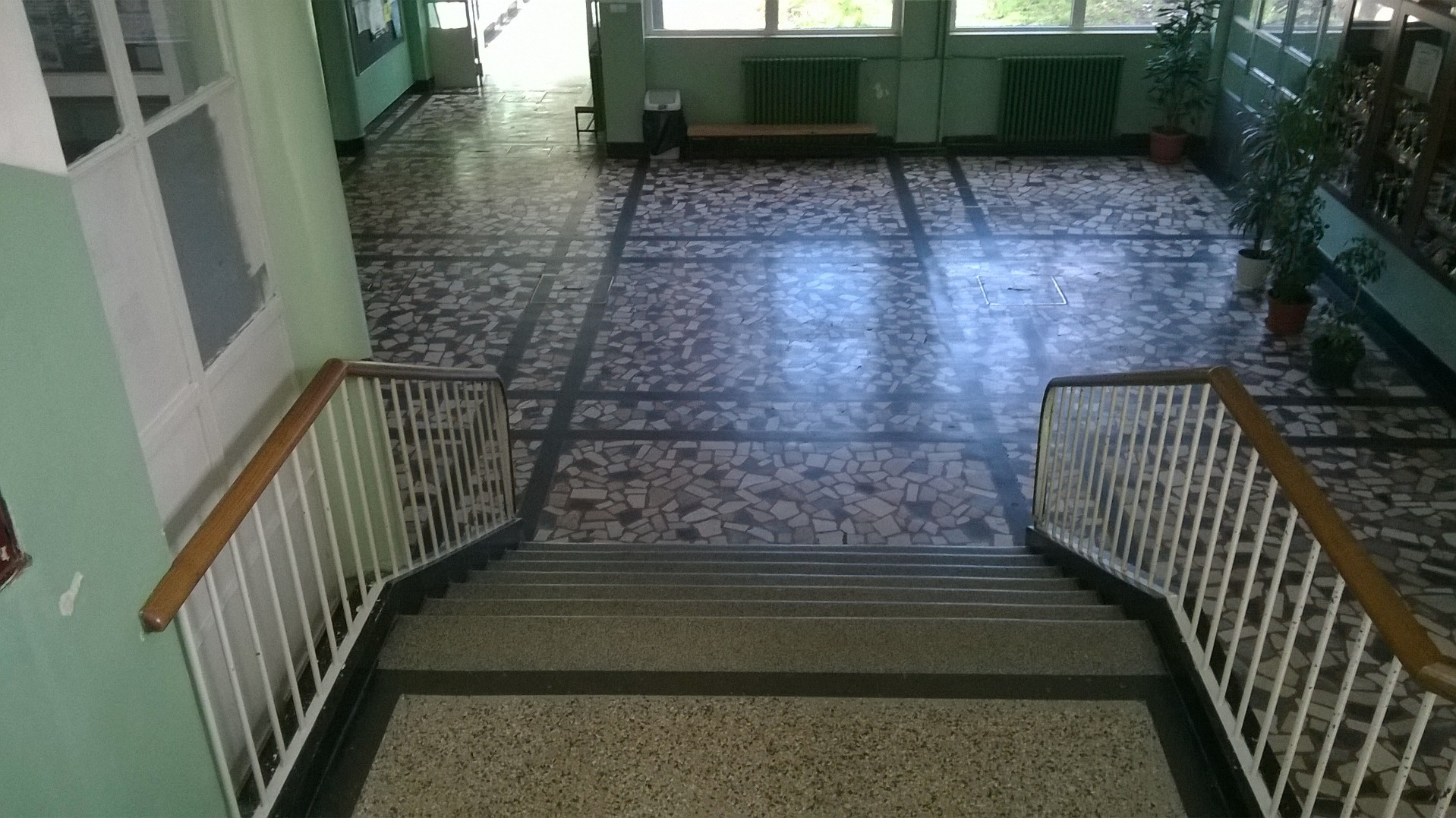
Ninth Belgrade Gymnasium "Mihailo Petrović-Alas" Stairs

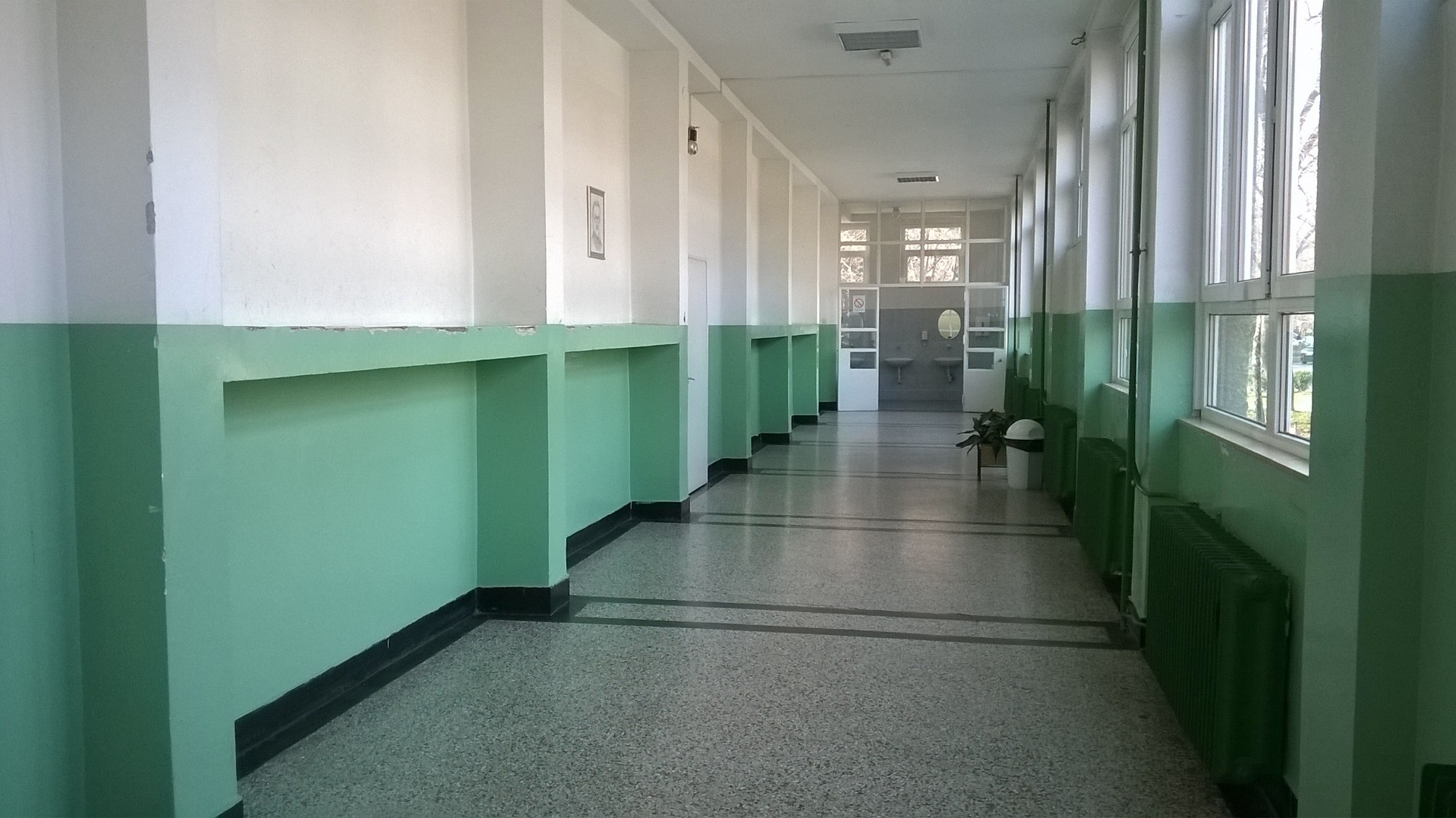
Ninth Belgrade Gymnasium "Mihailo Petrović-Alas" Corridor

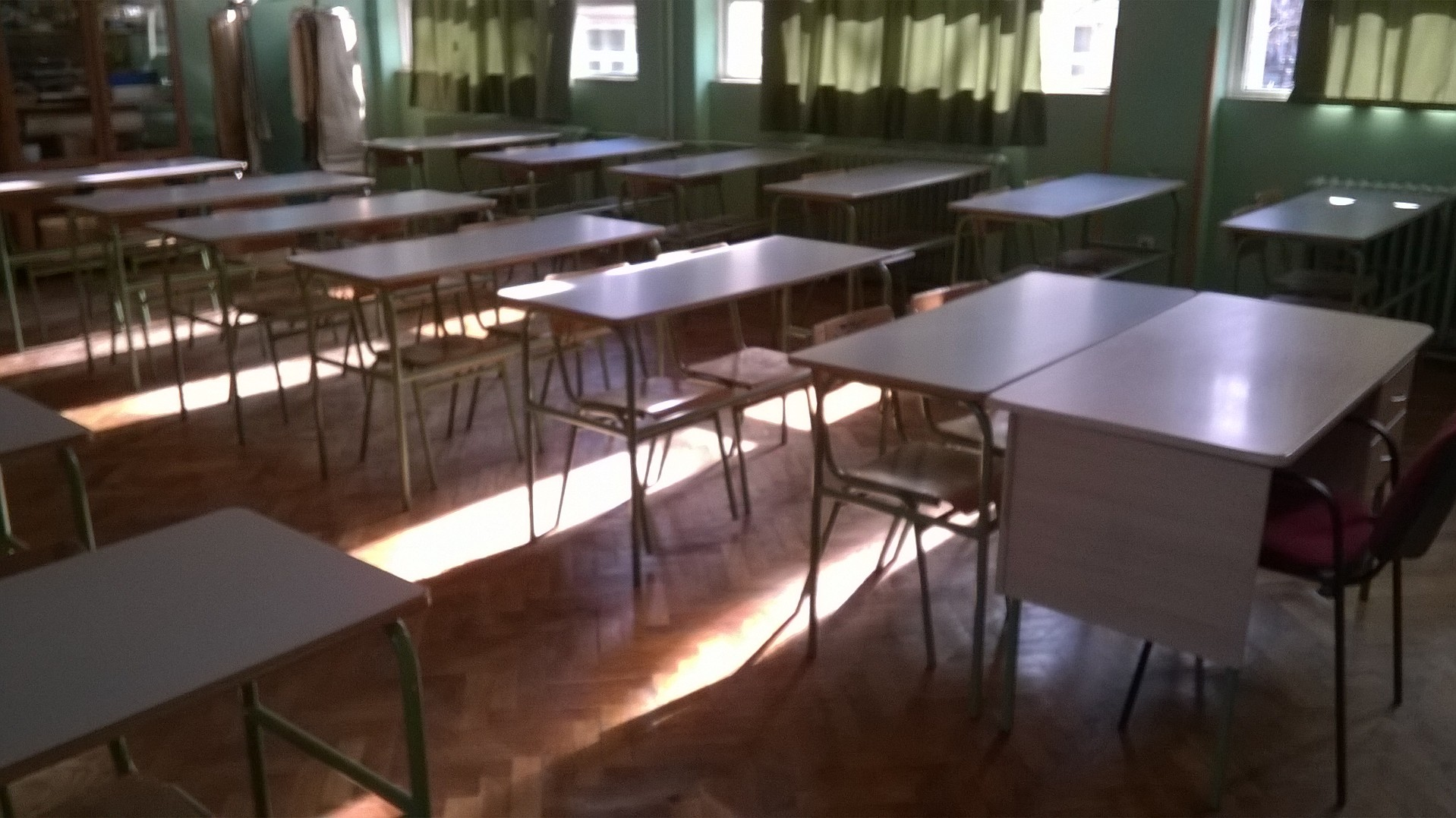
Ninth Belgrade Gymnasium "Mihailo Petrović-Alas" Classroom

== See also ==
- Gymnasium (school)
- New Belgrade
- The Zemun Gymnasium
