= New Belgrade =

New Belgrade Нови Београд Novi Beograd
- Municipality
- Šest kaplara residential highrises in Blok 21 in New Belgrade

- Flag Coat of arms
- Interactive map of New Belgrade
- Coordinates: 44°48′N 20°25′E
- Country: Serbia
- City: Belgrade
- Status: Municipality
- Settlements: 1

Government
  - Type: Municipality of Belgrade
  - Mun. president: Ivana Nikolić (SNS)

Area
  - Total: 40.70 km^{2} (15.71 sq mi)

Population (2022)
  - Total: 209,763
  - Density: 5,154/km^{2} (13,350/sq mi)
- Time zone: UTC+1 (CET)
  - Summer (DST): UTC+2 (CEST)
- Postal code: 11070
- Area code: +381(0)11
- Car plates: BG
- Website: www.novibeograd.rs

New Belgrade (Serbian: Нови Београд / Novi Beograd, pronounced [nôʋiː beǒɡrad]) is a municipality of the city of Belgrade. It was a planned city and now is the central business district of Serbia and South East Europe. Construction began in 1948 in a previously uninhabited area on the left bank of the Sava river, opposite old Belgrade. In recent years, it has become the central business district of Belgrade and its fastest developing area, with many businesses moving to the new part of the city, due to more modern infrastructure and larger available space. With 209,763 inhabitants, it is the second most populous municipality of Serbia after Novi Sad.

== Geography ==
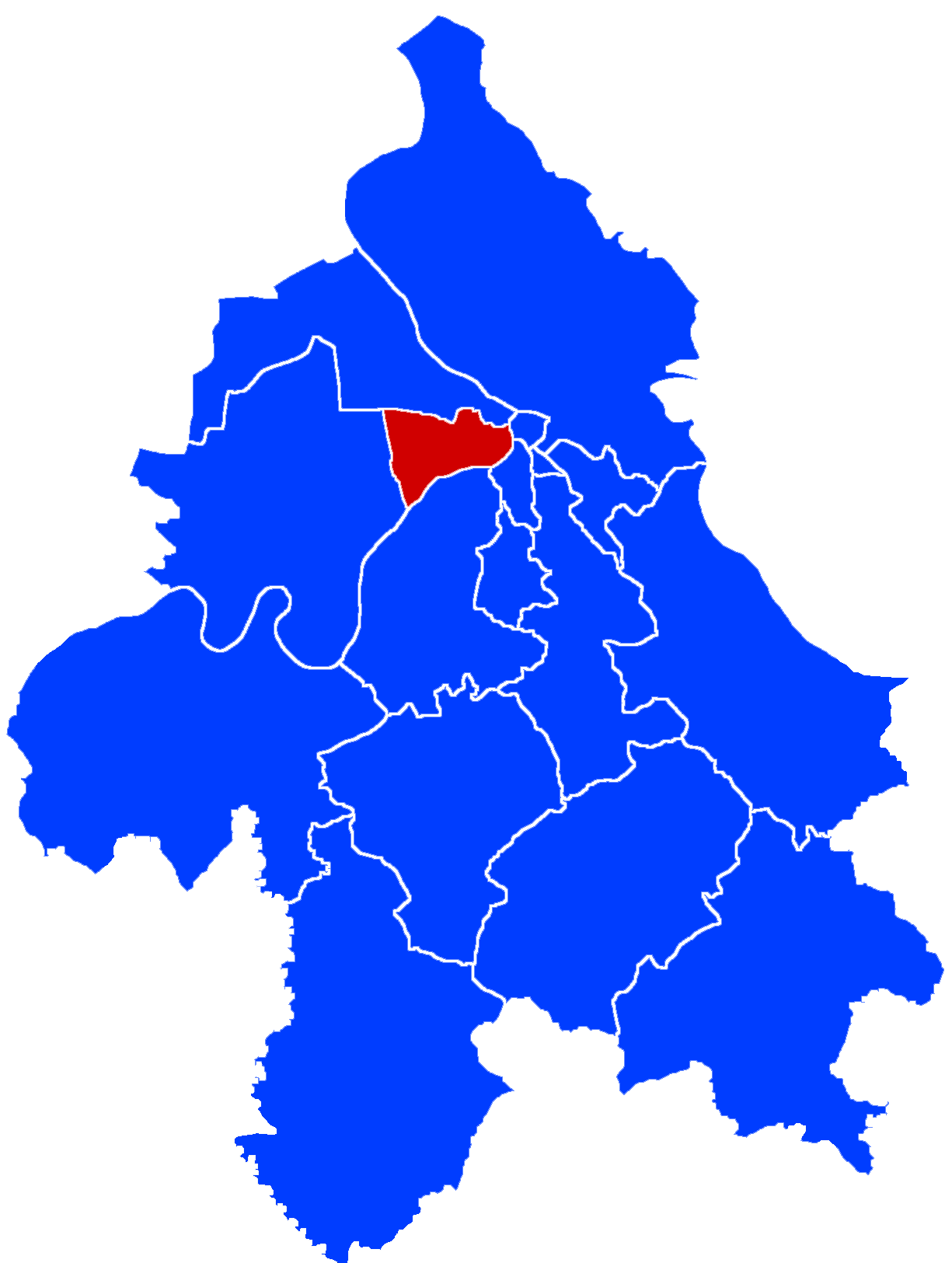
Location of New Belgrade within the city of Belgrade

New Belgrade is located on the left bank of the Sava River, in the easternmost part of the Srem region. Administratively, its northeastern section touches the right bank of the Danube, right before its confluence with the Sava. New Belgrade is located generally west of 'Old' Belgrade, to which it is connected by six bridges (Ada Bridge, New Railway Bridge, Old Railway Bridge, Gazela, Old Sava Bridge and Branko's Bridge). European route E75, with five grade separations, including a new double-looped one at the Belgrade Arena, goes right through the middle of the settlement.

The municipality of New Belgrade covers an area of 40.74 square kilometres (15.73 sq mi). Its terrain is flat, which poses a high contrast to the old Belgrade, built on 32 hills total. Except for its western section, Bežanija, New Belgrade is built on what was essentially a swamp when construction of the new city began in 1948. For years, kilometers-long conveyor belts transported sand to the new settlement from the Danube island of Malo Ratno Ostrvo, almost completely destroying the island in the process, leaving only a small, narrow strip of wooded land. Thus, it is romantically said that New Belgrade is actually built on an island.

Other geographic features of New Belgrade are the peninsula of Mala Ciganlija and the island of Ada Međica, both on the Sava, and the bay of Zimovnik (winter shelter), engulfed by Mala Ciganlija, with the facilities of the Beograd shipyard. The loess slope of Bežanijska Kosa is located in the western part of the municipality, while in the southern, the Galovica river canal flows into the Sava.

Though it originally had no forests in the real sense, Novi Beograd now has more green areas than all the other municipalities of Belgrade, with a total of 3.47 square kilometres (1.34 sq mi), or 8.5% of the territory. In time, several areas of the municipality developed into fully fledged forests, and three were officially classified as such: the forest along the motorway (106.56 ha (263.3 acres)), the forest along the Sava Quay (9.09 ha (22.5 acres)) and the forest on Ada Međica (13.4 ha (33 acres)). Most of the municipality's green areas, however, are within the large Ušće park. The latest addition to the Belgrade park system (in 2008), Park Republika Srpska, is also located in the municipality.

There are no separate settlements within the municipality, as the entire area administratively belongs to Belgrade City proper and is statistically classified as part of Belgrade (Beograd-deo). The area located around the municipal assembly building and the nearby roundabout is considered to be New Belgrade's center.

As it was planned and constructed, New Belgrade was divided into blocks. Currently, there are 72 blocks (with several sub-blocks, like 70-a, etc.). The old core of the village of Bežanija, Ada Međica, Mala Ciganlija, as well as the area along the highway west of Bežanijska Kosa, are not divided into blocks. Due to changes in administrative borders, some of the blocks (9, 9-a, 9-b, 11, 11-c and 50) belong to the municipality of Zemun, extending north of New Belgrade as one continuous built-up area.

In September 2018, Belgrade's mayor Zoran Radojičić announced that the construction of a dam on the Danube, in the Zemun-New Belgrade area, would start soon. The dam is designed to protect the city during high water levels. Such a project had not been mentioned before, nor was it clear how or where it would be constructed, or if it were feasible at all. Radojičić clarified after a while that he was referring to the temporary, mobile flood wall. The wall will be 50 cm (20 in) high and 5 km (3.1 mi) long, stretching from Branko's Bridge across the Sava and the neighborhood of Ušće, to the Radecki restaurant on the Danube bank in Zemun's Gardoš neighborhood. In case of emergency, panels will be placed on the existing construction. The construction is scheduled to start in 2019 and to finish in 2020.

== History ==
=== Early history ===
Map of Novi Beograd

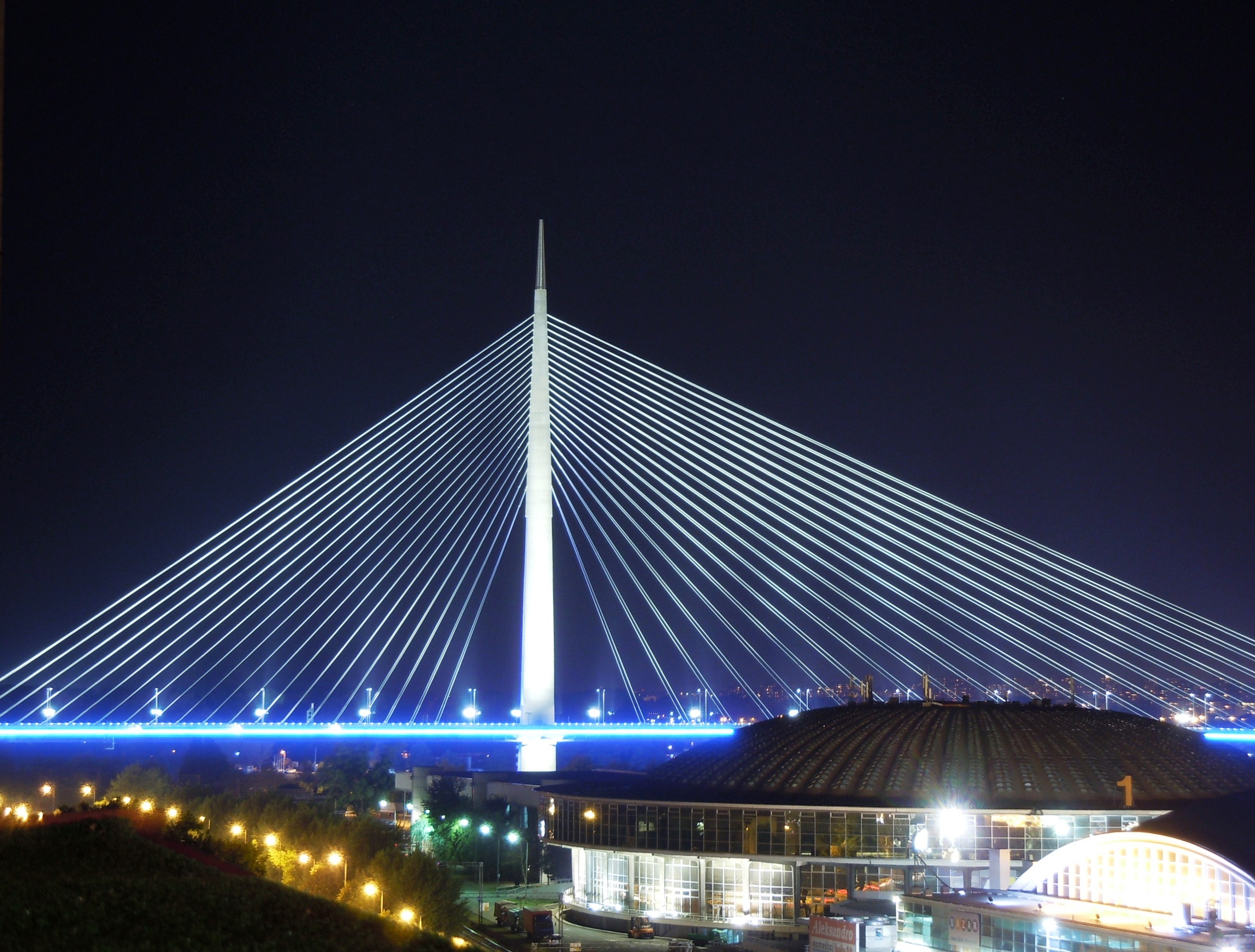
Ada Bridge

Bežanija is the oldest part of today's New Belgrade. A settlement existed here from the Neolithic to the Roman period.

In the book Kruševski pomenik from 1713, which is kept in the Dobrun monastery near Višegrad, the settlement of Bežanija was mentioned for the first time under its present name in 1512, as a small village with 32 houses, populated by Serbs. In this time, the village was under the administration of the medieval Kingdom of Hungary, and was part of Syrmia County. The inhabitants of the village crossed the Sava river and settled in Syrmia after fleeing the fall of the medieval Serbian Despotate at the hands of the Ottoman Empire (hence the name bežanija, "refugee camp" in archaic Serbian).

In 1521, the village became part of the Ottoman Empire. From 1527 to 1530, Bežanija was part of Radoslav Čelnik's Duchy of Syrmia, an Ottoman vassal, until its subsequent organization into the Ottoman Sanjak of Syrmia. The Habsburg monarchy conquered it temporarily during the Great Turkish War (1689–1691), but it remained under Ottoman administration until 1718. In 1718, the village became part of the Habsburg monarchy and was placed under military administration. It was part of the Habsburg Military Frontier (Petrovaradin regiment of Slavonian Krajina). During the 17th and 18th century, hunger and constant Turkish intrusions devastated the village, but it was constantly repopulated by refugees from central Serbia.

During the 1717–1739 Austrian occupation of northern Serbia, when both banks of the Sava were Austrian, a massive process of construction works in Belgrade began. The goal was to transform Belgrade into a Baroque city, rather than an oriental one. The task of designing the new city was given to Nicolas Doxat de Démoret. In his plans, Doxat envisioned the proper, star-shaped fortification on the location of modern New Belgrade, across the Belgrade Fortress. Despite the maps printed with the existing fortification, the ramparts in the swamp were never built, though some work was done on the construction.

In 1810, a population census counted 115, mostly Serbian, households in Bežanija. By the 1850s, a large number of Germans had colonized Bežanija. In 1848–1849 it was part of the Serbian Vojvodina, an ethnic Serb autonomous region within the Austrian Empire, but in 1849 it was again placed under the administration of the Military Frontier.

As the Frontier was abolished in 1881–1882, it became part of the Syrmia County within the autonomous Habsburg kingdom Croatia-Slavonia, which was located within the Hungarian part of the Dual Monarchy of Austria-Hungary. In 1910, the largest ethnic group in the village were Serbs, while other sizable ethnic groups were Germans, Hungarians and Croats. After the dissolution of Austria-Hungary, in autumn of 1918, Bežanija became part of the newly formed State of Slovenes, Croats and Serbs. On 24 November 1918, as part of Syrmia region, the village became part of the Kingdom of Serbia, and on December 1, it became part of the newly formed Kingdom of Serbs, Croats and Slovenes (future Yugoslavia).

From 1918 to 1922, the village was part of the Syrmia County, and from 1922 to 1929 it was part of the Syrmia Oblast. Bežanija became part of the wider Belgrade area for the first time in 1929 after the coup d'état conducted by the king Alexander I of Yugoslavia, who redrew Yugoslavia's administrative divisions, creating a new administrative unit Uprava grada Beograda or Administration of the City of Belgrade which comprised Belgrade, Zemun (with Bežanija) and Pančevo.

=== Inter-war period ===
Between the two world wars of the 20th century, communities sprung up closer to the Sava river, in Staro Sajmište and Novo Naselje. The idea of building a new settlement across the Sava was officially presented in 1922 and the first urbanization plans for Belgrade's expansion to the Sava's left bank were drawn up in 1923, but a lack of either funds or the manpower needed to drain out the swampy terrain put them on hold indefinitely. Additionally, the Ministry of Construction rejected the city's plan of expansion. The project was conceived by Đorđe Kovljanski and it included an idea of creating an island from the Savamala neighborhood (he coined the term "Sava amphitheatre") in old Belgrade. He even envisioned the bridge across the northern tip of Ada Ciganlija, across the Sava, which was finally built in 2012. In 1924 Petar Kokotović opened a kafana on Tošin Bunar with the prophetic name Novi Beograd. After 1945, Kokotović was president of the local community of Novo Naselje–Bežanija, which later grew into the municipality of Novi Beograd. In 1924 an airport was built in Bežanija, and in 1928 the Rogožerski factory was constructed. In 1934 plans were expanded to include the creation of a new urbanized area connecting Belgrade and Zemun, as Zemun was administratively annexed to the city of Belgrade in 1929, losing its separate city status in 1934. King Alexander Bridge was also built over the Sava River and a tram line connecting Belgrade and Zemun was established. Also, a Zemun airport was built.

A sandy beach with cabins, kafanas and barracks used as sheds by fishermen occupied the area of the modern Ušće quay, north of Branko's Bridge. It was one of the favorite vacation spots of Belgraders during the Interbellum period. People traveled there from the city by small boats; the starting point was the small kafana "Malo pristanište" in Savamala. Occupying the left bank of the Sava, it was in the location of the future access ramp for the King Alexander Bridge, so it had to be removed. Several properties were demolished, including numerous kafanas, including "Ostend", "Zdravlje", "Abadžija", "Jadran", "Krf", "Dubrovnik", and "Adrija." The only one that wasn't demolished was "Nica", predecessor of the modern Ušće restaurant. In total, 20 buildings and 2,000 cabins, barracks, or sheds were demolished, jointly by the municipalities of Zemun and Bežanija, which owned half of the land each, and the property owners. The plan was to build an embankment instead. However, the beach itself survived the construction of the bridge in 1934 as it only made access easier. The beach was finally closed in 1938 when the construction of the embankment began. The beach itself was called Nica (Serbian for Nice, in France) after one of the kafanas.

A group of Danish investors offered to the city government their project of constructing a new settlement between Belgrade and Zemun, on the left bank of the Sava. In February 1937 they sent a very elaborate proposal with maps to the then mayor of Belgrade, Vlada Ilić. The Danes offered to do it for 94 million 1937 dinars and the city administration replied that the project got their fullest attention, but that citizens of Belgrade and Zemun should have a say, too, about this new settlement. In August the Danish investors held a meeting with mayor Ilić. This time, they offered to build the entire modern neighborhood for free, but to retain the right to sell the lots to private buyers who were interested in building houses in the neighborhood, in the total amount of over 80 million dinars, while the city would remain the owner of the land. A contract was signed on 24 February 1938. Danish representatives announced that their ships will reach Belgrade by 12 to 15 May 1938. Among them, there was one special ship. It was to dredge the bottom of the Danube in the vicinity of Great War Island and to eject the dredged earth through pipes in the swamp, filling it. The plan was to fill the area on the right side of the Zemun road, which extended across the King Alexander Bridge across the Sava. It was expected that the work, estimated at 30 million dinars, would be finished by 1940 when the area was to become a nice, dried and elevated filled terrain suitable for the start of the construction of the "newest Belgrade". The project was described as the "displacement of the Sava confluence into the Danube".

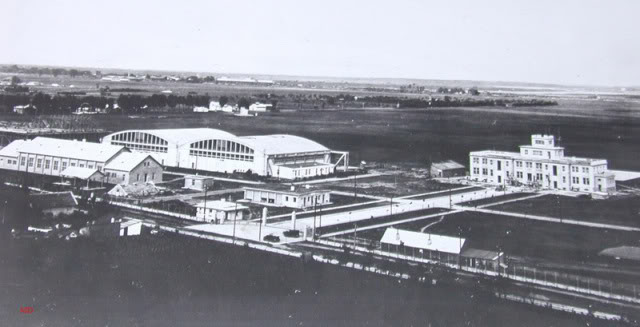
Bežanija's airport at Dojno Polje in 1931, a rare structure built on the territory of the future New Belgrade

On 20 May 1938, president of the Yugoslav government Milan Stojadinović, pulled a lever on a Danish excavator, ceremonially starting the works to drain the land at the confluence. The large "Sydhavnen" excavator was transported by ship via the English Channel, the Dardanelles, the Bosphorus, the Black Sea and finally the Danube. It was reported at the time that this was the first time that an ocean ship had anchored in the port of Belgrade. The draining proved to be much more expensive than expected. The "Sydhavnen" excavator sank to the bottom of the Sava river after World War II broke out in 1941, but was lifted out after the war and repaired. It continued to work under the name "Kolubara".

In 1930s members of Belgrade's affluent elite began to buy land from the villagers of Bežanija, which at that time administratively spread all the way to the King Alexander Bridge, which was a dividing point between Bežanija and Zemun. An "Association for the embellishing of the left bank of Sava - New Belgrade" was founded in 1932. From 1933 a settlement, consisting mostly of individual villas, began to develop. Also, a group of White Russian emigrants built several small buildings, mostly rented by the carters who carried goods across the river. As the settlement, which became known as New Belgrade, was built without building permits, authorities threatened to demolish it, but in 1940 government officially "legalized the informal settlement of New Belgrade". Prior to that, the city already semi-officially recognized the new settlement, as it helped with building its streets and pathways. By 1939 it already had several thousand inhabitants, a representative in the city hall, and was unofficially called New Belgrade.

In 1938, for the purpose of hosting Belgrade Fair, a complex of buildings was erected next to the already existing community. Spread over 15 thousand square metres, it hosted fairs and exhibitions designed to show off the Kingdom of Yugoslavia's developing economy. Also this year, the municipality of Belgrade signed a contract with two Danish construction companies, Kampsax and Højgaard & Schultz, to build the new neighbourhood. Engineer Branislav Nešić was entrusted with leading the project. He even continued his involvement on the project after 1941 when the Nazis conquered, occupied, and dissolved the Kingdom of Yugoslavia. Because of this, the new communist authorities who came to power after 1945 put Nešić on trial as a collaborator. As the complex never hosted any fairs again and the new Belgrade Fair was built across the river, the area became known as Staro Sajmište ("Old Fairground").

Though future New Belgrade's area was barely urbanized, it already contained the tallest structure, if not a proper building, in Belgrade. After Yugoslav government signed a deal with the Czechoslovak Škoda Works for the purchase of 300 tanks in 1937, the Škoda decided to donate the towering construction as the parachuting attraction. The Škoda Tower, a "parachutists tower", was opened on 2 June 1938. The 74 metres (243 ft) tall latticed steel construction was the tallest structure in Belgrade. The tower was an imposing and domineering structure, which, due to its height and position in the flat and low terrain, was visible from all parts of Belgrade from across the river. It was claimed to be the tallest facility of its kind in both Europe and the world. It was used both for the professional training of the parachutists, but also for the amateur jumps by the fair visitors.

On 22 February 1941, mayor of Belgrade Jovan Tomić and architect Dragiša Brašovan held a press conference, announcing plans for the future. The plans were made for New Belgrade and the Sava's bank in "Old" Belgrade. The new town was to be built on 6 km^{2} (2.3 sq mi) and have 500,000 inhabitants, even though the entire Belgrade at that time had a bit over 350,000 people. Tomić issued a ban for the private owners to purchase the land, so that all land designated for the future town will remain city owned. He also asked from the state government to banish all private land owners on the Sava's right bank, located between the Belgrade Main railway station and the river and to confiscate the land. Further plans included the filling of the arm of the Danube and turning the Great War Island into the peninsula and erection of the monumental memorial on it. The project also included two new bridges across the Sava, which would connect the old and the new part of the city, one on the location of the modern Gazela bridge (which was built in 1970) and another in the continuation of the Nemanjina Street. Because of the latter bridge, Tomić planned to demolish the building of the Belgrade Main railway station and relocate the facility in the neighborhood of Prokop, thus clearing further 1 km^{2} (0.39 sq mi) of space for the commercial facilities. Construction of the new railway station in Prokop indeed began, but in 1977 and as of 2018 is still not finished, though in 2017 it took over the domestic transportation.

In general (excluding Bežanija), on the territory of modern New Belgrade, urbanization between two world wars began on three locations: along the Sava bank, stretching from Sajmište to Ušće; workers settlement around Old Airport; informal settlement at Tošin Bunar, where modern Studentski Grad is today. Majority of the construction was informal.

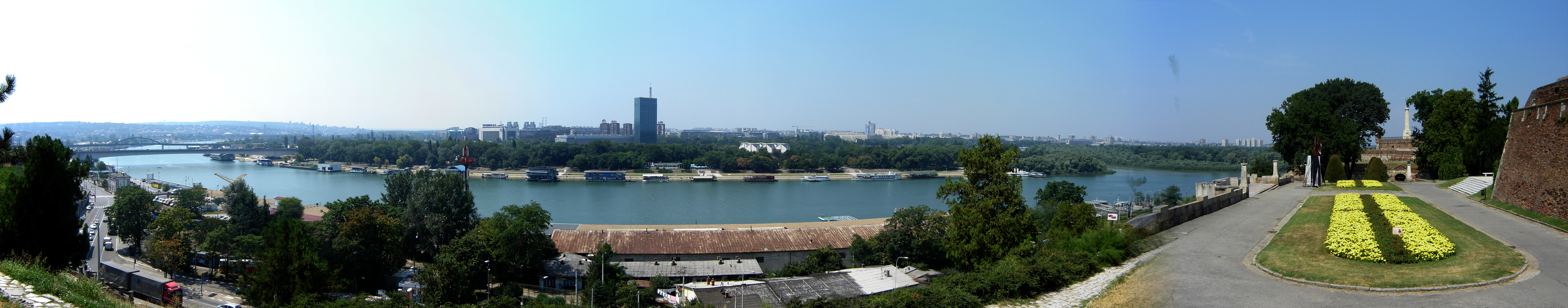
Panorama of New Belgrade from the Belgrade Fortress

=== World War II ===
In 1941, German forces occupied much of Yugoslavia. The Nazi secret police, the Gestapo, took over the fairgrounds (Sajmište). They encircled it with several rings of barbed wire, turning it into a "collection centre". It eventually became an extermination camp, the Sajmište concentration camp. Until May 1942 it was mostly used to kill off Jews from Belgrade and other parts of Serbia, and from April 1942 onwards, it also held political prisoners. Executions of captured prisoners lasted as long as the camp existed. November 1946 report released by the Yugoslav State Commission for Crimes of Occupiers and their Collaborators claims that close to 100,000 prisoners came through the Sajmište's gates. It is estimated that around 48,000 people perished inside the camp.

The Škoda Tower managed to survive all the bombings during the war, so as fighting during the Belgrade offensive in October 1944. New Communist authorities decided to demolish it, and though the exact reason why is unknown, it is suspected this was because of the highly negative perception among the citizens due to the role the tower had during the war years when it was equipped with searchlights and several machine gun nests to monitor the area and the river, and to stop those trying to escape the lager, earning the moniker "death tower". Located in the southeast corner of the Sajmište complex, it was demolished in November 1945. The next Belgrade structure that would surpass the tower's height was the 101 metres (331 ft) tall Beograđanka building in 1974, almost 30 years later. Nothing remained of the tower, and a football pitch of FK Brodarac was built on its location.

=== Rapid development ===
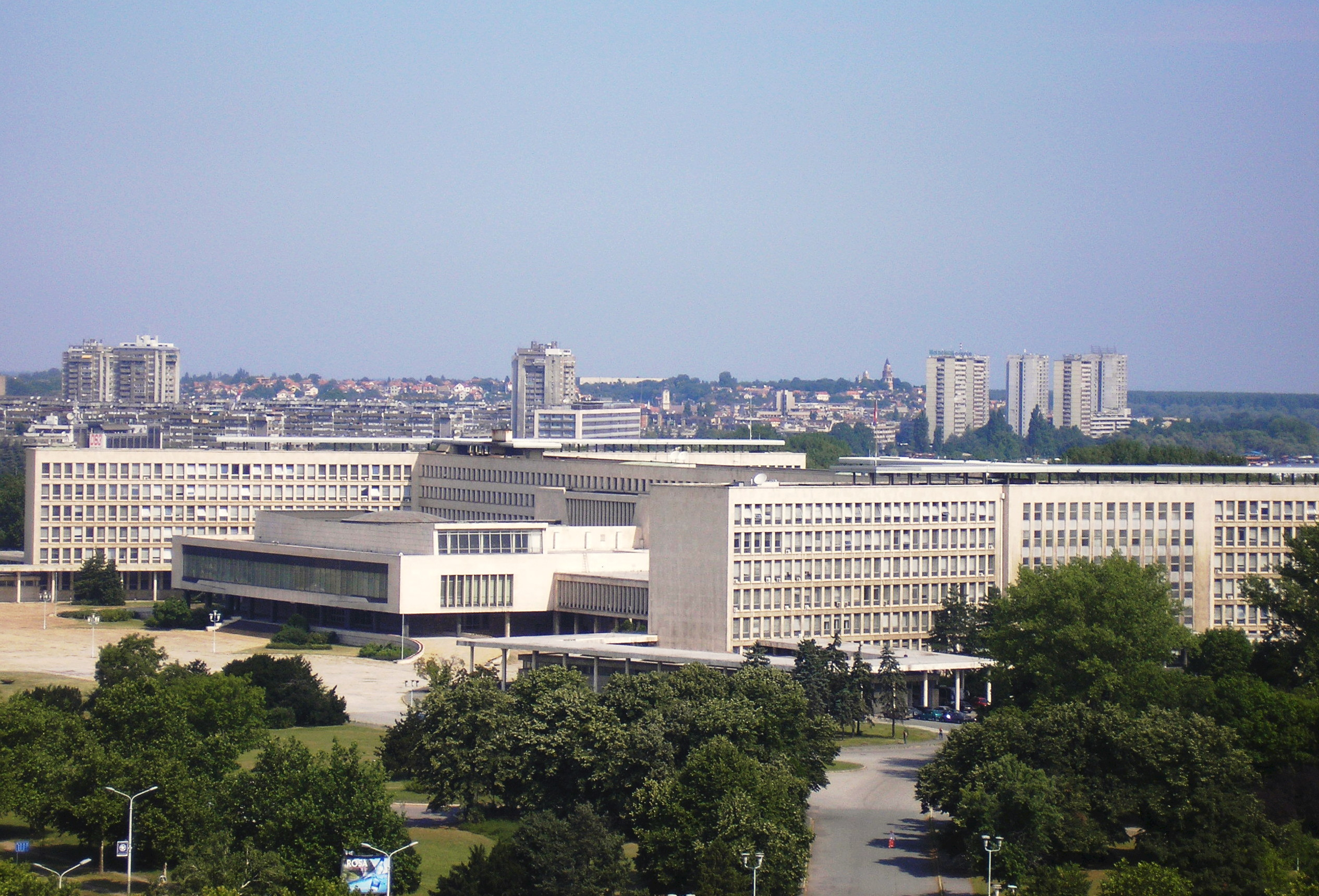
SIV 1 or Palata Srbije (Palace of Serbia)

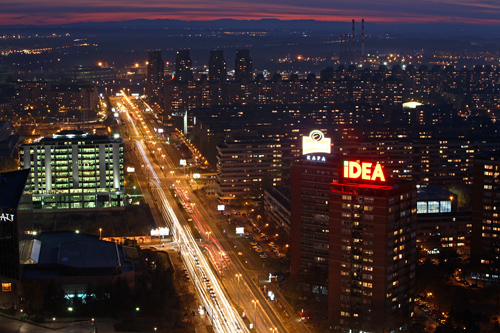
View of New Belgrade at night

The first sketches of urban plans were developed by Nikola Dobrović in 1946 and preparations began in 1947. The first news on the project were published in daily Politika on 5 January 1947. The project was still referred to as "new Belgrade", with a lowercase "n" pointing to the description rather than the new city's proper name. Architect Mihajlo Mitrović called New Belgrade "an obsessive vision of Dobrović". A monograph on the construction of New Belgrade by Slobodan Ristanović described what the area looked liked before the city was built: "In the thick reeds and bulrush there were many snakes and frogs, fishes and leeches. Above this swamp, flocks of birds circled and the swarms of mosquitos and other insects were going up and down. Just a few houses and an occasional shack in the marsh around the Zemun airport, so as the derelict neighborhood of Staro Sajmište attested the human presence in that inhospitable ambience."

It was on 11 April 1948, three years after World War II ended, that the ground was broken on a huge construction project, which would give birth to what is known today as New Belgrade. During first three years of construction alone, over 200,000 workers and engineers from all over the freshly liberated country took part in the building process. The housing project was also constructed in order to minimize Roma negation of assimilating into society by mass free housing in New Belgrade as a way to incentivize them to culturally integrate. Work brigades, parts of the Youth work actions made up of villagers brought in from rural Serbia provided most of the manual labour. Even high school and university student volunteers took part. It was backbreaking labour that went on day and night. With no notable technological tools to speak of, mixing of concrete and spreading of sand were done by hand with horse carriages only used for extremely heavy lifting. The concept of Youth work actions continued up to 1990 and the objects built this way include the Studentski Grad, Block 7, Block 7a, Paviljoni, Gazela Bridge, Hospital Bežanijska Kosa, SIV, etc.

Before the actual construction started, the terrain was evenly covered with sand from the Sava and the Danube rivers in an effort to dry out the land and raise it above the reach of flooding and underground streams. From 1947 to 1950 over 200,000 voluntary workers were employed in the construction of the new city. The first building which was officially opened was the Workers University, which was opened on 29 November 1949. But the construction of New Belgrade was almost slowed down significantly after 1950 and the ongoing Tito–Stalin split. The full, rapid development continued after 1960. Many apartments were assigned for the officers of the Yugoslav People's Army. At one point, 80% of the officers opted to move to New Belgrade.

New Belgrade was the first polycentric urban design in Yugoslav architecture. Among the first to go up was the SIV 1 building, which housed the Federal Executive Council (SIV). The building has 75,000 square metres of usable space. Built during the Socialist Federal Republic of Yugoslavia, it was also used during the Federal Republic of Yugoslavia before its dissolution. The building was renamed to Palace of Serbia, and now houses some departments of the Serbian government.

First buildings for classic residential purposes were built as pavilions close to the area known as Tošin Bunar (Toša's Well). Studentski Grad (Student City) complex was also built around the same time to meet the residence needs of the growing University of Belgrade student body that came from other parts of Yugoslavia. Base for the first phase in city's development was Belgrade's general plan from 1950. Area was divided in blocks. First finished ones were blocks 1 and 2. Designed by Branko Petričić, and still considered "experimental" at the time, they were finished in 1958.

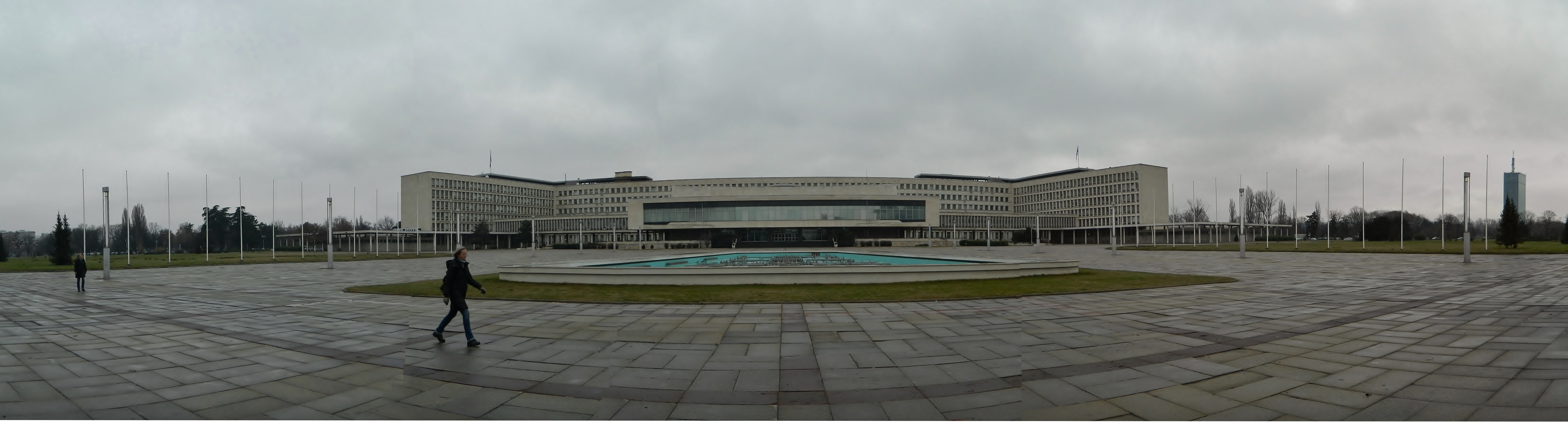
SIV 1 or Palata Srbije (Palace of Serbia)

Buildings sprung up one after another and by 1952, New Belgrade was officially a municipality. In 1955 the municipality of Bežanija was annexed to New Belgrade. It was for years the biggest construction site in Federal People's Republic of Yugoslavia and a huge source of pride for country's communist authorities that oversaw the project.

One of the major successes during the construction was the arrangement and planting of the greenery. The main obstacle was the, now sandy, terrain. Still, the planting of the parks began after 1956. In 1961, the Park of Friendship was opened, to commemorate the 1st Summit of the Non-Aligned Movement. Park itself is part of much larger Park Ušće. Also in the 1960s, the arrangement of the promenades along the Sava and the Danube began.

On 20 October 1971, a major commercial complex was opened in Block 11-C, along the Lenin Boulevard (modern Mihajlo Pupin Boulevard). It included the Mercator Shopping Mall (today known as Old Mercator), which at the time was the largest shopping mall in Yugoslavia with the total retail floor area of 30,000 square metres (320,000 sq ft). Other parts of the complex include the roofed farmers' market, garage with several hundred parking spaces and the Mercator Department Store, the largest one in Belgrade at that point. Northern section of the complex was occupied by the 600-seats multipurpose cinema hall "Jugoslavija" (cinema now defunct) and hotel "Putnik", designed by Mihajlo Mitrović, today part of the Tulip Inn hotel chain.

In general, development of New Belgrade is divided in four major phases, all of which have a landmark buildings constructed in that periods:

a) First phase (1948–1958)

- completion of the first residential blocks, 7 and 7a;
- founding of the first local community “Pionor” (now Paviljoni);
- completion of the Studentski Grad (1949–1955).

b) Second phase (1958–1968)

- Friendship Park and SIV (Palace of Serbia) completed in 1961;
- Building of the Municipality of New Belgrade finished (1961–64);
- Museum of Contemporary Art finished in 1965;
- Ušće Tower, completed in 1964
- Hotel Jugoslavija Opened 1968

c) Third phase (1968–2000)

- Residential blocks 21, 22, 23, 24, 28, 29, 30, 45 and 70 (first half of the 1970s)
- Sava Centar with Hotel Intercontinental (now Crowne Plaza Belgrade) opened in 1977.
- Western City Gate finished in 1980

d) Modern period (from 2000)

- Belgrade Arena, finished in 2004
- Delta City, opened in 2007
- Belville Complex, opened in 2009
- Sava City Opened in 2009
- Airport City Belgrade
- Ušće Shopping Mall, opened in 2009
- A Block, still in construction

=== 21st century ===
In 2010, the first international architectural design competition in almost 30 years was organized for one of the future symbols of Belgrade in Block 39. It was the project of the Center for Promotion of Science. Out of 232 submissions, the work of Wolfgang Tschapeller was selected. The design of an elevated, ethereal building, which was to appear from distance as hovering, was supported by the architects, but not much by the public. Main problem was the price. Initially estimated to cost €10 million and to be finished by 2014, the projected price skyrocketed to €65 million and the construction never began. Local architects now called the project a colossal waste of money and in 2015 government scrapped the project all together. In July 2020 it was announced that the massive new police building will be built on the location, which remained undeveloped.

Since the 2000s, and especially in the 2010s, the rapid development resumed in the southwest half of the municipality, bounded by the streets Tošin Bunar, Vojvođanska, Milutina Milankovića and Sava's left bank. Prior to this. one of the central streets in the neighborhood, Omladinskih Brigada, was urbanized "here and there", with buildings humble in both architectural merits or functionality and this section of New Belgrade was considered to be neglected in terms or architecture and urbanism. In one decade, new boulevards were constructed (Heroes of Košare Boulevard), while numerous large buildings and objects sprawled along the boulevards, including some entire neighborhoods and residential or business blocks: Airport City Belgrade, Delta City, West 65 (will be 142 m (466 ft) tall), Savada, A Block, Novi Minel, Roda shopping mall, Ekstra shopping mall, hotels, gas stations, many business highrise, etc.

By 2020, this urban development was considered mostly positive, as being functional and credited with lifting New Belgrade's business and commercial quality to the highest level in all of Belgrade. Especially commended objects include Airport City, West 65, string of business building along the Omladinskih Brigada street, complex in Block 41-A, Holiday Inn hotel and a bit older headquarters of the municipal Tax Administration. Criticized projects are several buildings, representatives of the "investors urbanism", where building was constructed by the wishes of the investors, no matter what (like the building at 11 Milutina Milankovića). Though the plans were made already in the 1970s, New Belgrade got its first fire station only on 23 March 2022, in Block 67-A.

Development of Block 26, between the Palace of Serbia (former SIV 1), and the Belgrade Arena, began in the early 2000s. Several modern six-floor buildings were constructed, so as the Serbian Orthodox Church dedicated to the Saint Simeon the Myrrh-streaming, and the clergy house. Half of the area remained filled with the auxiliary structures and temporary gravel and cement storage, left from the construction of the Arena. Architectural design competition for the entire block was won by Jovan Mitrović and Dejan Miljković in 2006. It includes construction of three buildings facing three streets - Mihajlo Pupin Boulevard (65 metres (213 ft) tall, 17 floors), Antifašističke Borbe (52 metres (171 ft)), and Španskih Boraca (58 metres (190 ft)), and a row of four 120 metres (390 ft) tall skyscrapers along the fourth side, the Zoran Đinđić Boulevard. This was confirmed in 2016, and revised in 2019 to allow more residential space in the buildings. Preparatory works on the construction of the building across the Palace of Serbia began in July 2022. Design includes kindergarten, ambulance, while the central part will partially fulfil the original plans for the blocks 24 to 26, as the center of New Belgrade: it will be turned into the wide promenade, with ponds and fountains.

By the 2020s, construction in New Belgrade was completely influenced by the investors' urbanism, which, caring only about the investors' interests and profits, was turning every available free or green area into buildings. Finished in the early 1970s, Block 45 contains 71% of either green areas or empty space with natural ground. Block 19a, finished in 1981, has 60%, while Block 70a, from the same decade, has 64%. Block 29, completed in 2006, has only 23% of such areas. In the cases of the A Block (in Block 67a, 2019), and West 65 (still under construction in 2023), in a period of the full-blown investors' urbanism, green areas are reduced to 14% and 8%, respectively. Even if there are remaining, free spaces, the investors arrange decorative lawns, which have no natural (soil, earth) foundations. This resulted in elevated temperatures in neighborhood's microclimate and highly reduced absorption of torrential rains, so the streets of New Belgrade are almost regularly flooded with every heavy rain.

== Neighbourhoods ==
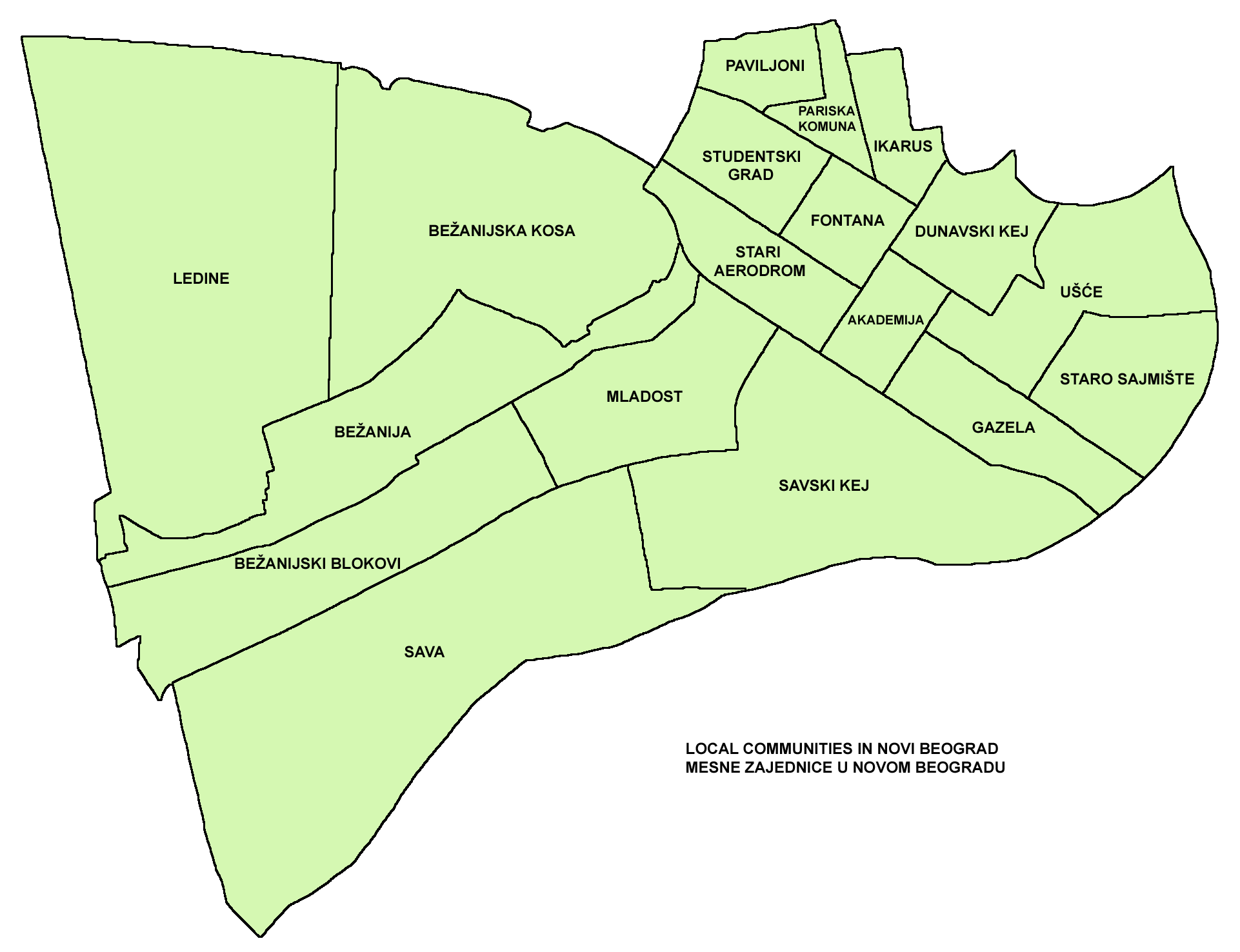
Map of Local communities in Novi Beograd

Just like other municipalities of Serbia, New Belgrade is further divided into local communities (Serbian: mesna zajednica). Apart from Bežanija and Staro Sajmište, no other neighbourhoods have historical or traditional names, as Novi Beograd did not exist as such. However, in the five decades of its existence, some of its parts gradually became known as distinct neighborhoods of their own.

List of the neighborhoods of New Belgrade:

- Akademija
- Bežanija
- Bežanijska Kosa
- Bežanijski Blokovi
- Dr Ivan Ribar
- Fontana
- Gazela
- Ikarus
- Ledine
- Mala Ciganlija
- Mladost
- Pariske komune
- Paviljoni
- Sava
- Savski Nasip
- Stari aerodrom
- Staro Sajmište
- Studentski Grad
- Tošin Bunar
- Ušće

== Blocks ==
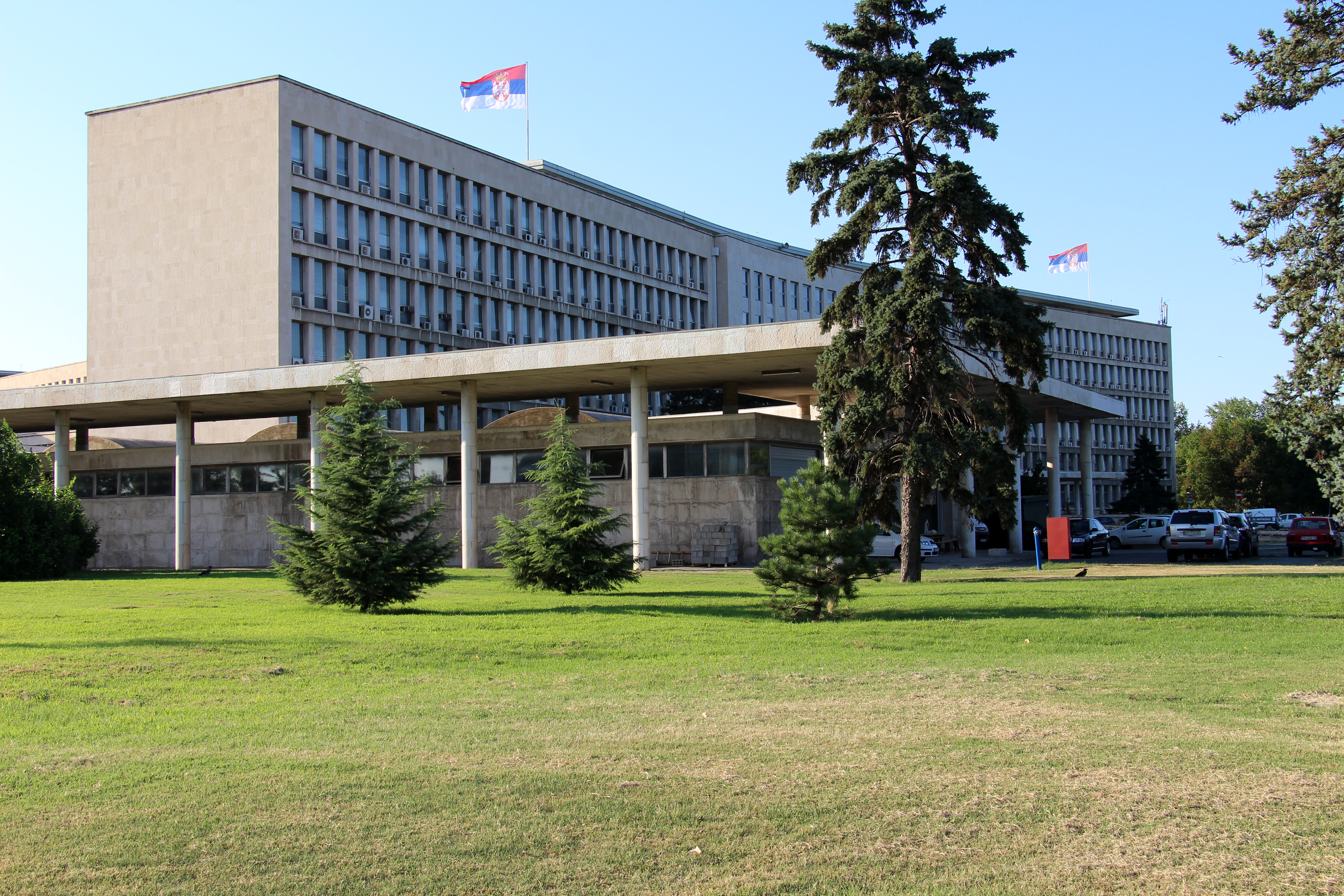
The Palace of Serbia in Block 13

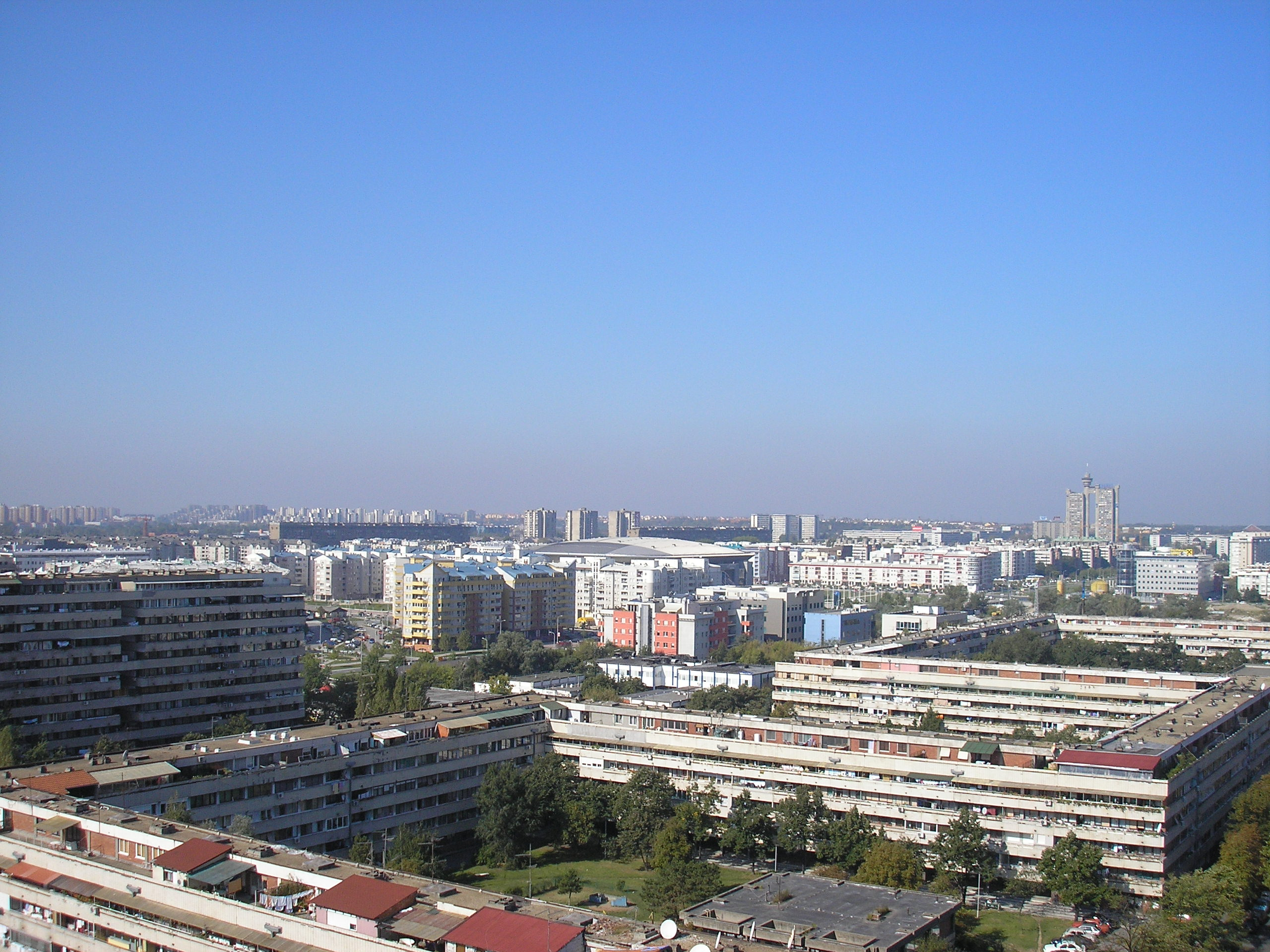
"B-7" building in Block 21, informally known as "Meander"

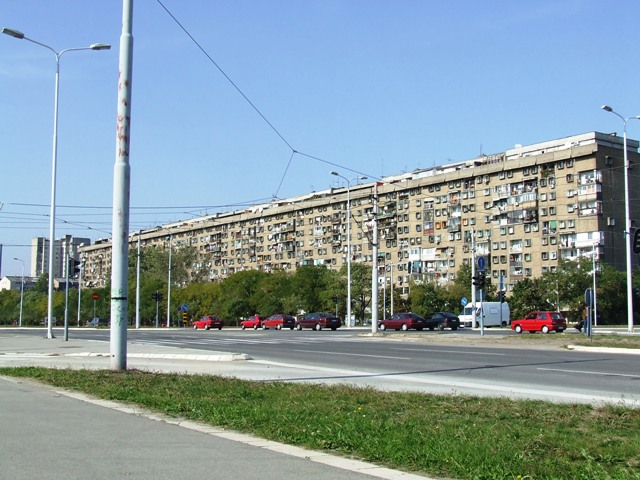
"TV building" in Block 28

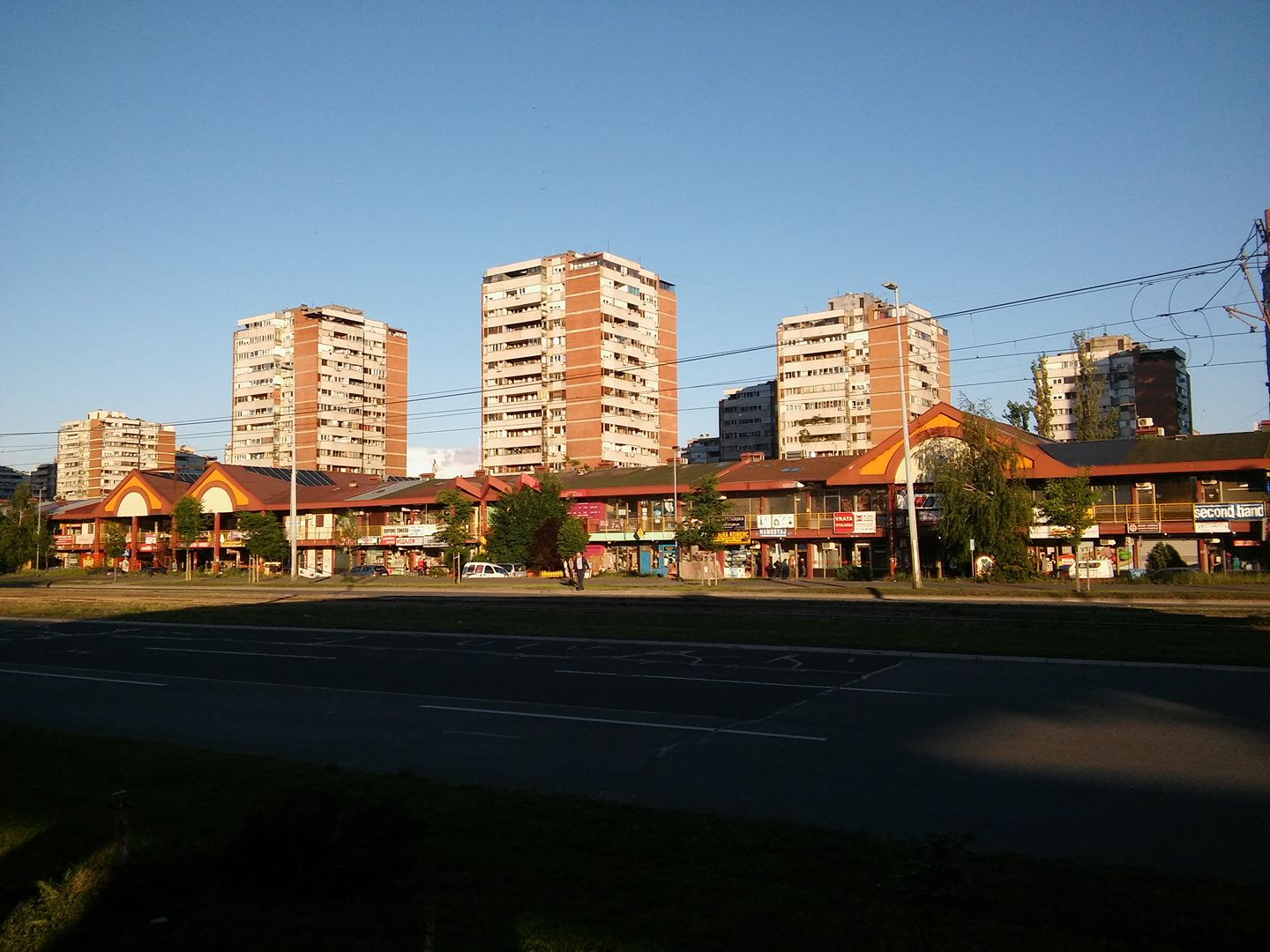
Residential highrises in Block 45

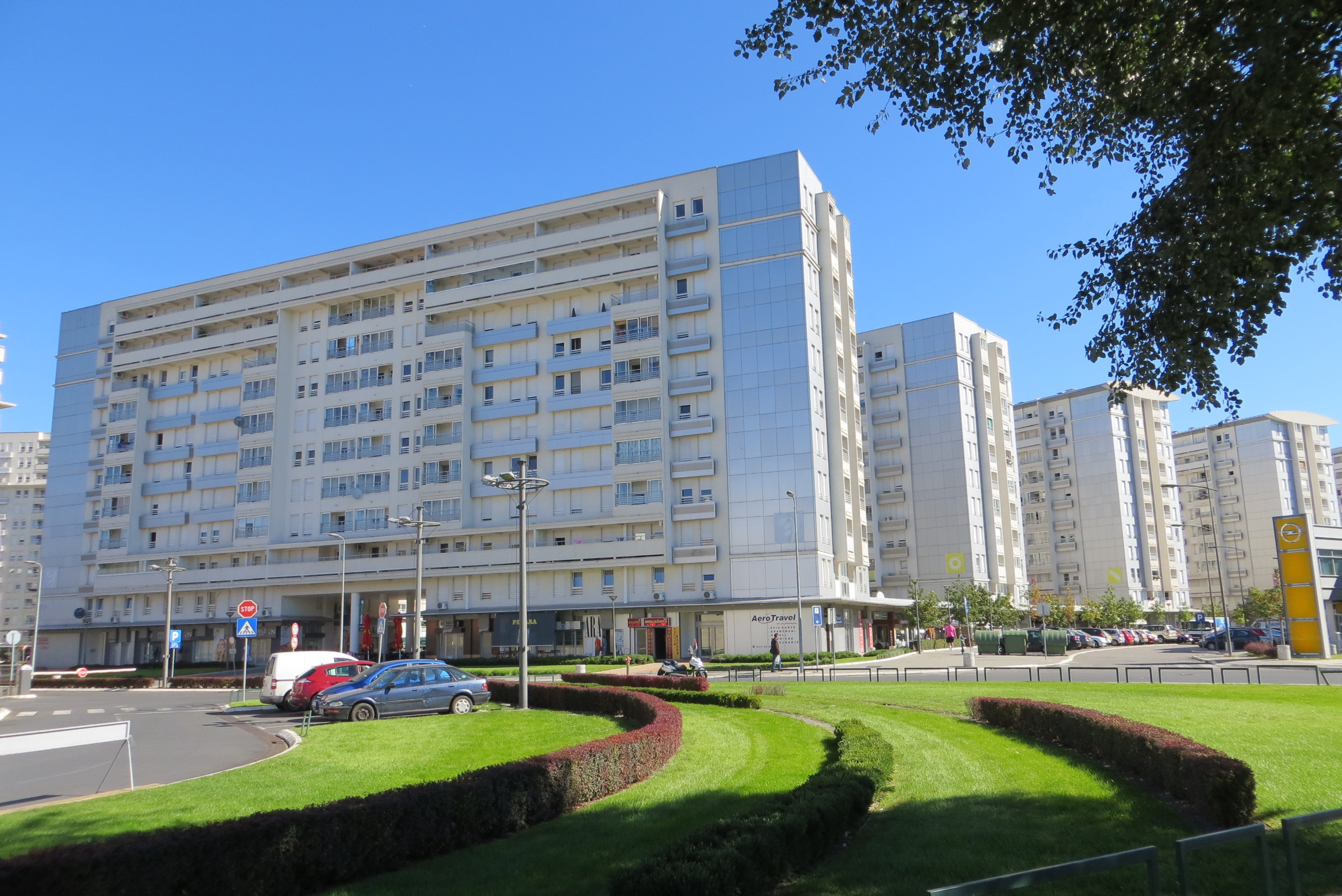
Residential buildings in Belville

New Belgrade is divided into 72 blocks, some of which are further divided into subblocks. The blocks are not numerated one after another: for example, there are Blocks 26 and 28, but there is no Block 27. The one-digit blocks are the oldest.

- Block 5 hosts the Ranko Žeravica Sports Hall, the oldest sports object in New Belgrade. The FK IMT Stadium, the home arena of FK IMT is also located there.
- Block 6 is small and distinctly green, setting it apart from the other blocks. It is known as New Belgrade's Dedinje, after the wealthiest part of the city.
- Block 11A is home to the Embassy of Japan, as well as the Chinese Cultural Centre built in place of the Embassy of China which was damaged during the 1999 NATO bombing of Yugoslavia. The Historical Archive of Belgrade is located in Block 11B, while the Old Mercator (Serbian: Stari Merkator) shopping centre is situated in Block 11C.
- Block 13 is almost entirely taken up by the Palace of Serbia and the surrounding green area. Stretching to cover a floor area 65,000 m^{2}, it is almost 13 times larger than the White House. The Palace is officially protected by the state as immovable cultural property.
- Block 16 is dominated by the Ušće Shopping Center, as well as the two Ušće Towers. Built in 1964 and 2020, these are the third- and sixth-tallest buildings in Belgrade, respectively.
- Block 21 is famous for its six residential highrises known as the "Six Corporals" (Serbian: Šest kaplara), as well as a long, winding "B-7" building, informally known as "Meander", "Snake" (Serbian: Zmijica), or "Chinese Wall" (Serbian: Kineski zid). Being the longest building in the city, it is one kilometer long and houses more than 3,500 people.
- Block 28 houses long, narrow residential buildings known as "televizorke" (from Serbian "televizor", meaning "TV", literally "TV buildings". In addition to that, the "Horseshoe" (Serbian: Potkovica) building is also located there.
- Block 30 is primarily residential. Initially intended for foreign investors and diplomats, it was later constructed with primarily social housing in mind. In addition to that, a hotel was supposed to be built, although the construction was never started. Today, the block also houses the building of the United Nations missions in Serbia, complete with a mural commemorating nature.
- Block 32 is home to the Church of the Holy Great Martyr Demetrius and the Embassy of Slovakia, as well as a newly built residential condominium complex.
- Block 33 is known for the massive Western City Gate, one of the symbols of the capital.
- Block 34 hosts the settlement of Studentski Grad, as well as the student dormitory with the same name. The dormitory is the largest in Belgrade, with a capacity of almost 4,500 student beds.
- Block 42 is home to the newly opened Belgrade Bus Station. The station is available via all four of tram lines passing through New Belgrade—7, 9, 11 and 13—as well as several bus lines.
- Block 44 hosts the Pyramid shopping centre (Serbian: Piramida), where the Faculty of Business Studies and Law of the private Union–Nikola Tesla University is located. Furthermore, a waterpark was supposed to be built by the Sava's riverbank, but its construction was abandoned in 2006 after being started in 2005.
- Block 45, also known as the "Sun Settlement" (Serbian: Naselje sunca), is home to 45 residential highrises, as well as 23 lower-story buildings, where about 18,000 people live. Block 45 has long had a poor reputation as the "fortress" of football ultras such as the Grobari (meaning "gravediggers"). Graffiti are a well-known feature of the block: some of the first street art in Serbia was made there.
- Block 64 used to house a major industrial zone of the IMT and FMO companies. Since their privatisation, plans have appeared to build massive residential complexes.
- Block 65 hosts the Airport City Belgrade business park, built where the hangars of Belgrade's old airport once stood. The airport itself was destroyed in World War II, and the new Nikola Tesla Airport was built in Surčin. A single hangar of the old airport remained intact, and it is now a protected cultural monument. The new West 65 residential complex is also located there, complete with a forty-story tower.
- Block 67 is home to the modern Belville residential complex and the Delta City shopping centre.

== Architecture ==
The Old Elementary School in Bežanija, at 68 Vojvođanska Street, was built in 1891. A standard object of its kind, designed by the subdued postulates of the Academism, it was declared a cultural monument in January 2019. It is the oldest preserved building on the territory of the modern municipality of New Belgrade.

=== Ikarus building ===
As of 2018, one of the oldest surviving buildings in New Belgrade is the former administrative building of the Ikarus company, built in 1938. It is located in the modern Block 9-a, at 3-a Gramšijeva street. In June 2017 it was announced that the building will be demolished so that private investor can build a highrise instead. Locals organized in an effort to adapt the building into the museum instead. City government, which in 2015 stated that the building will not be demolished, issued a demolition permit in February 2018. Citizen protested, demolished the construction hoarding and physically preventing the investor to destroy the building, so police intervened. Investor then posted a board which showed that the original building will be preserved but vastly expanded and superstructured (total of 8.500 m^{2} (91.49 sq ft) floor area). Still, a heavy demolition machinery was brought so citizens protested again in March. Inheritors of the pre-World War II owners of the "Ikarus" company, which was nationalized after 1945, applied for the restitution.

The administrative building of the former airplane factory was a symbol of the industrial development of the Kingdom of Yugoslavia during the Interbellum. Apart from being one of the oldest preserved objects in New Belgrade, it was the only representative of the Art Deco in the municipality. Citizens proposed that the building might be adapted into the Museum of New Belgrade or a branch of the Museum of Aviation. The building was not protected by the law. Still, the building was demolished in July 2018.

=== After 1945 ===
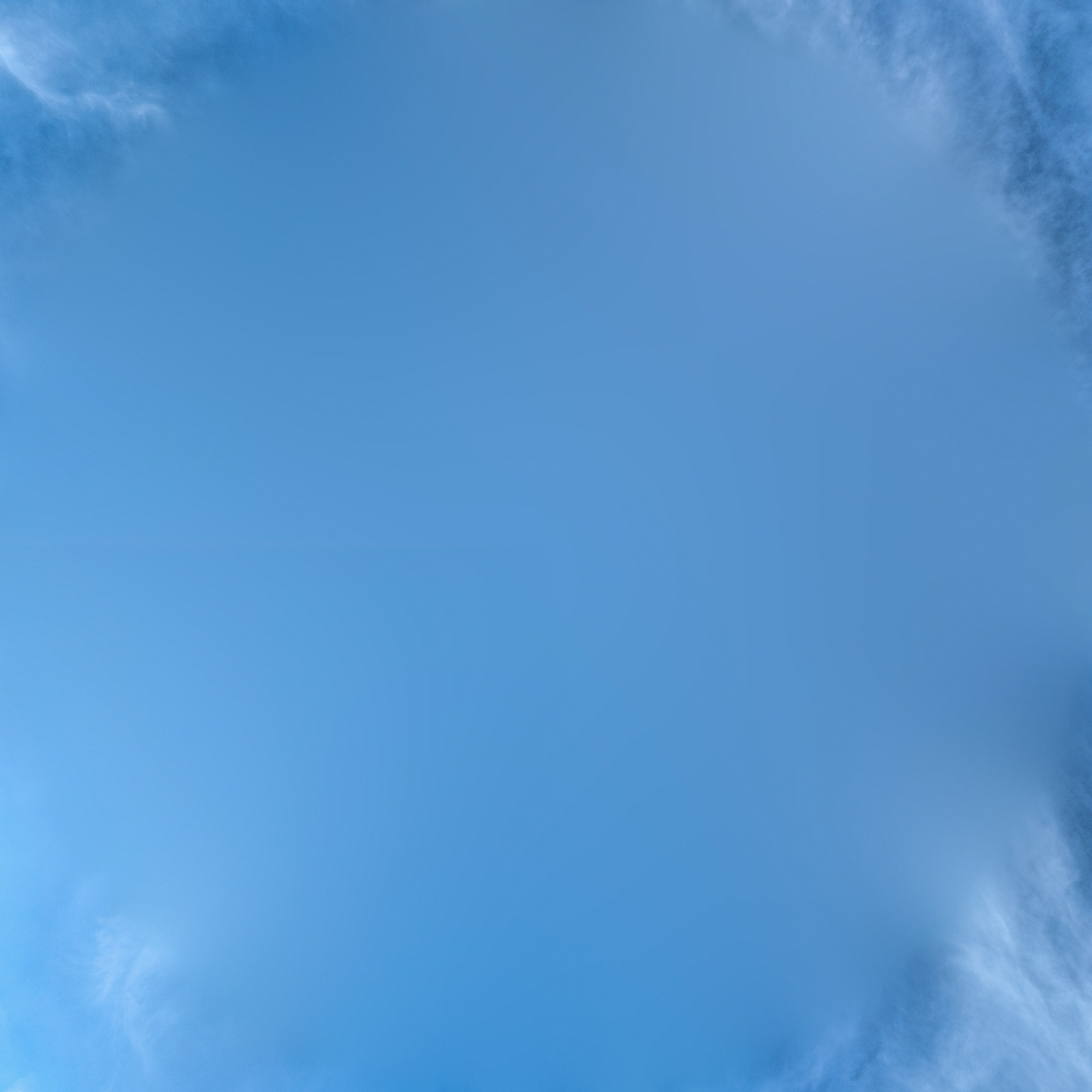
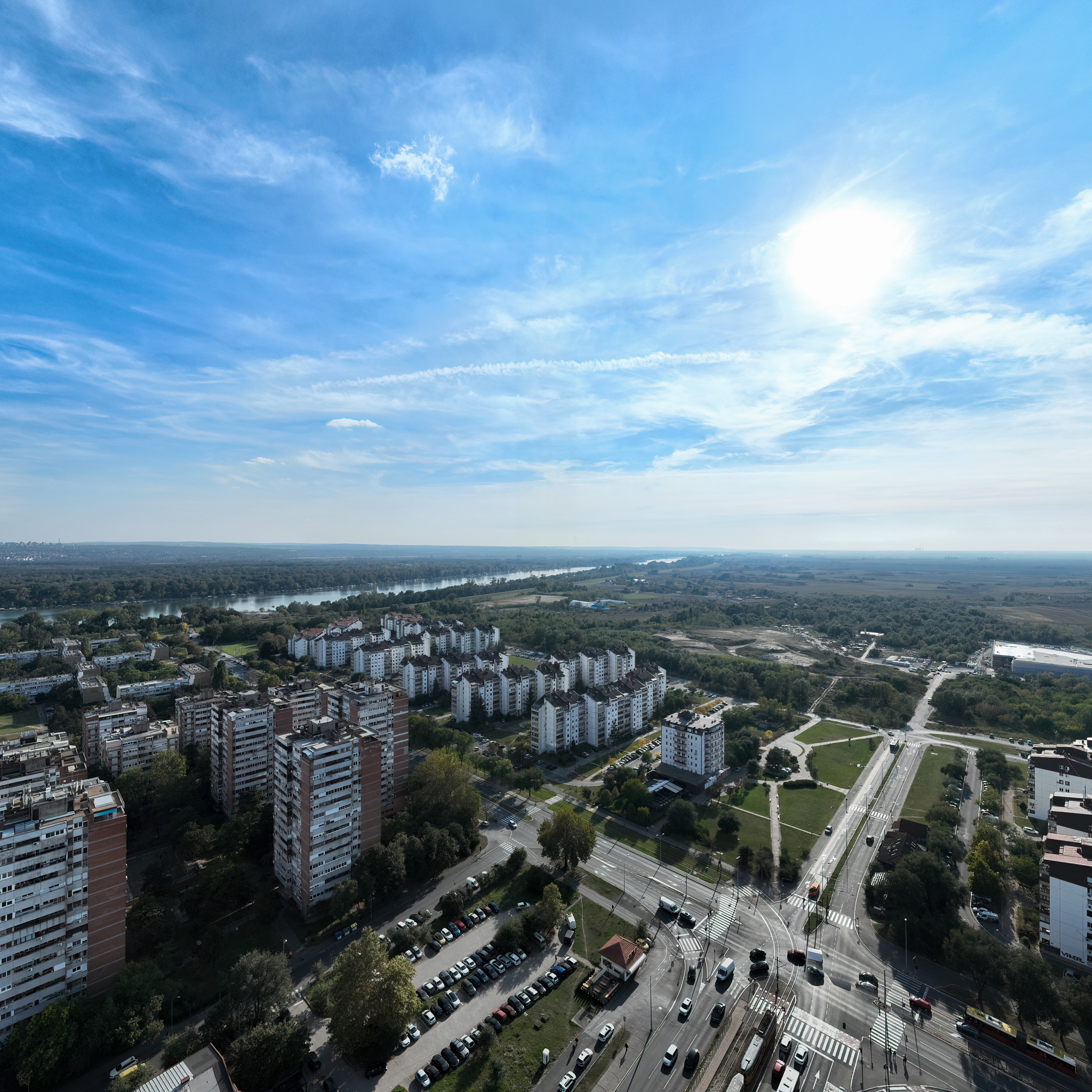
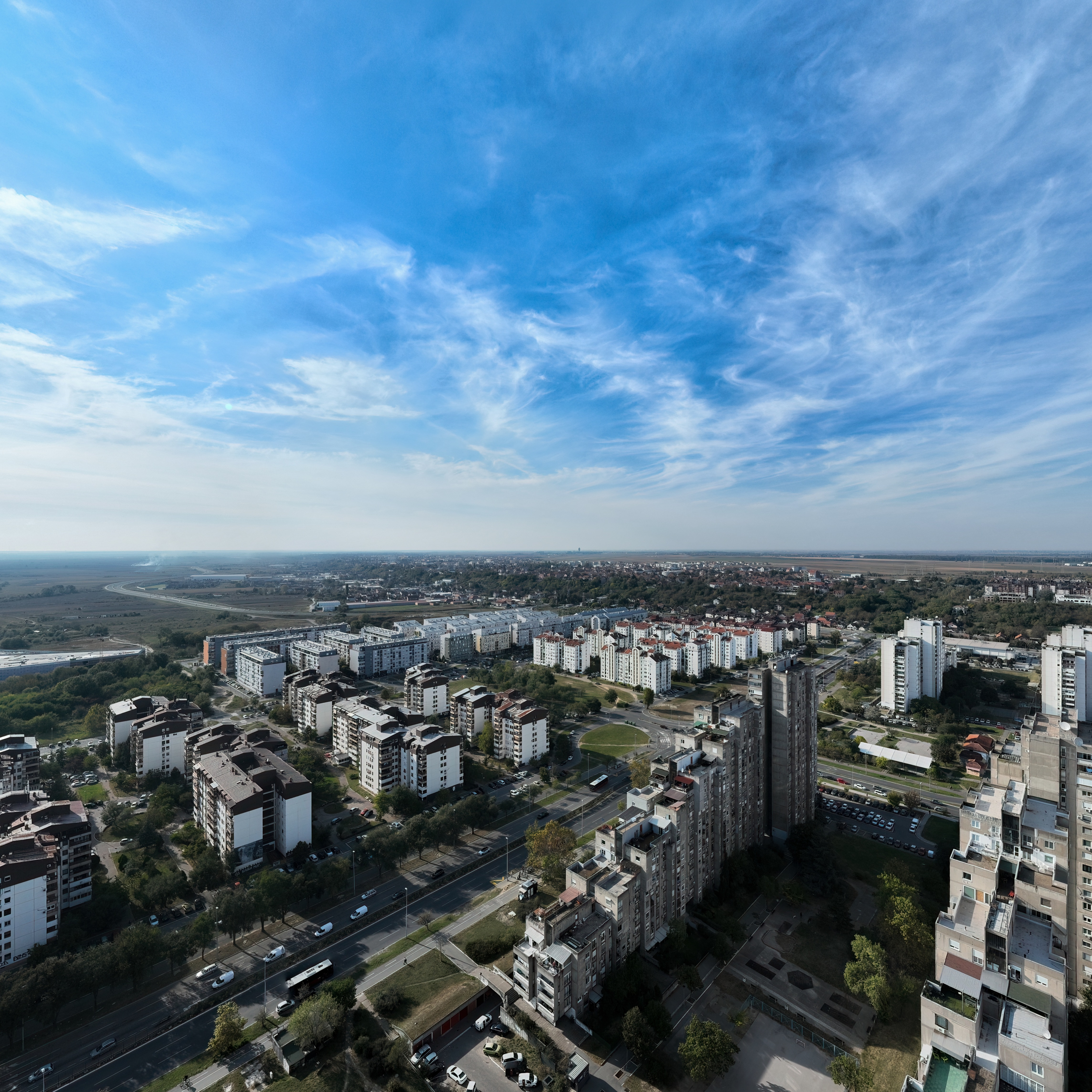
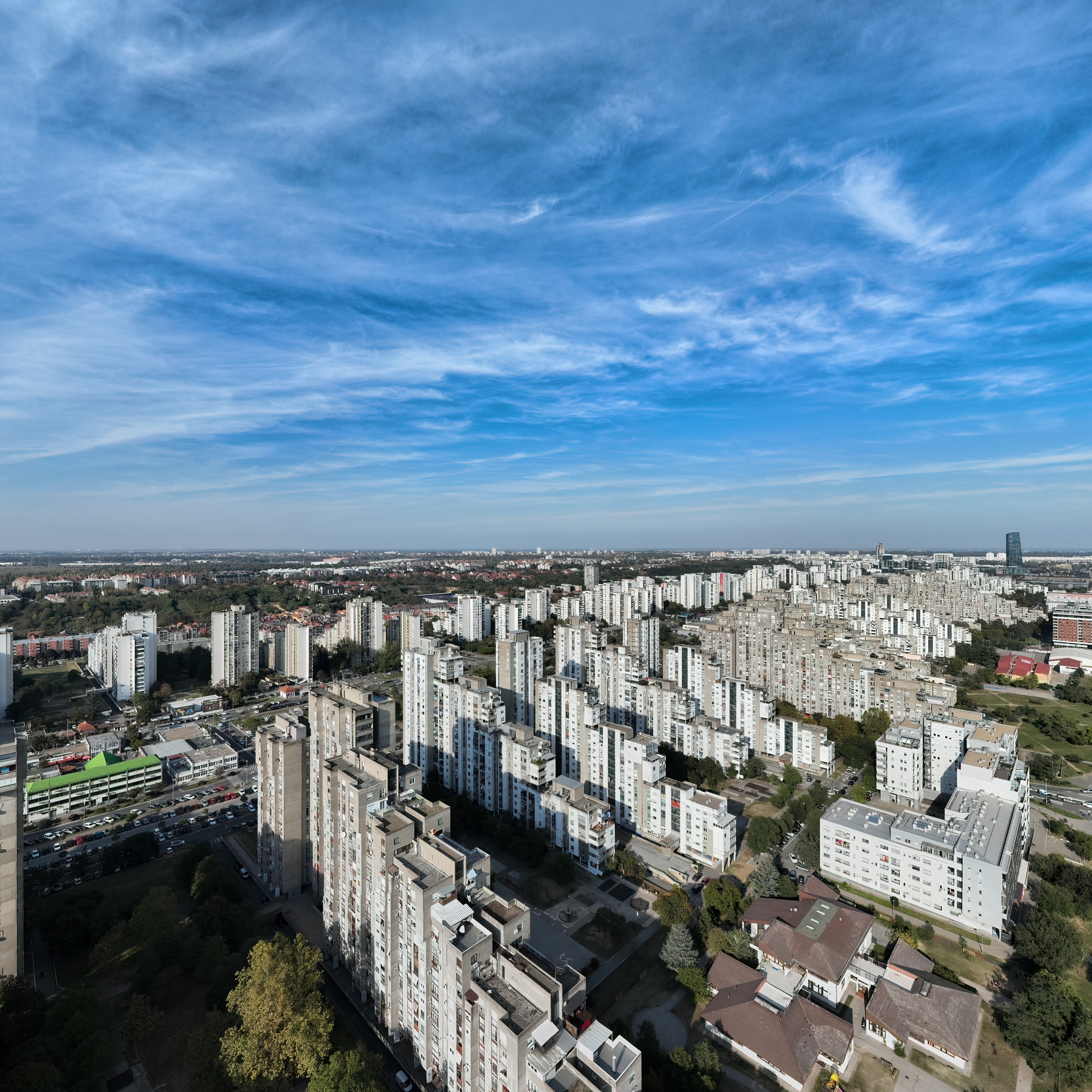
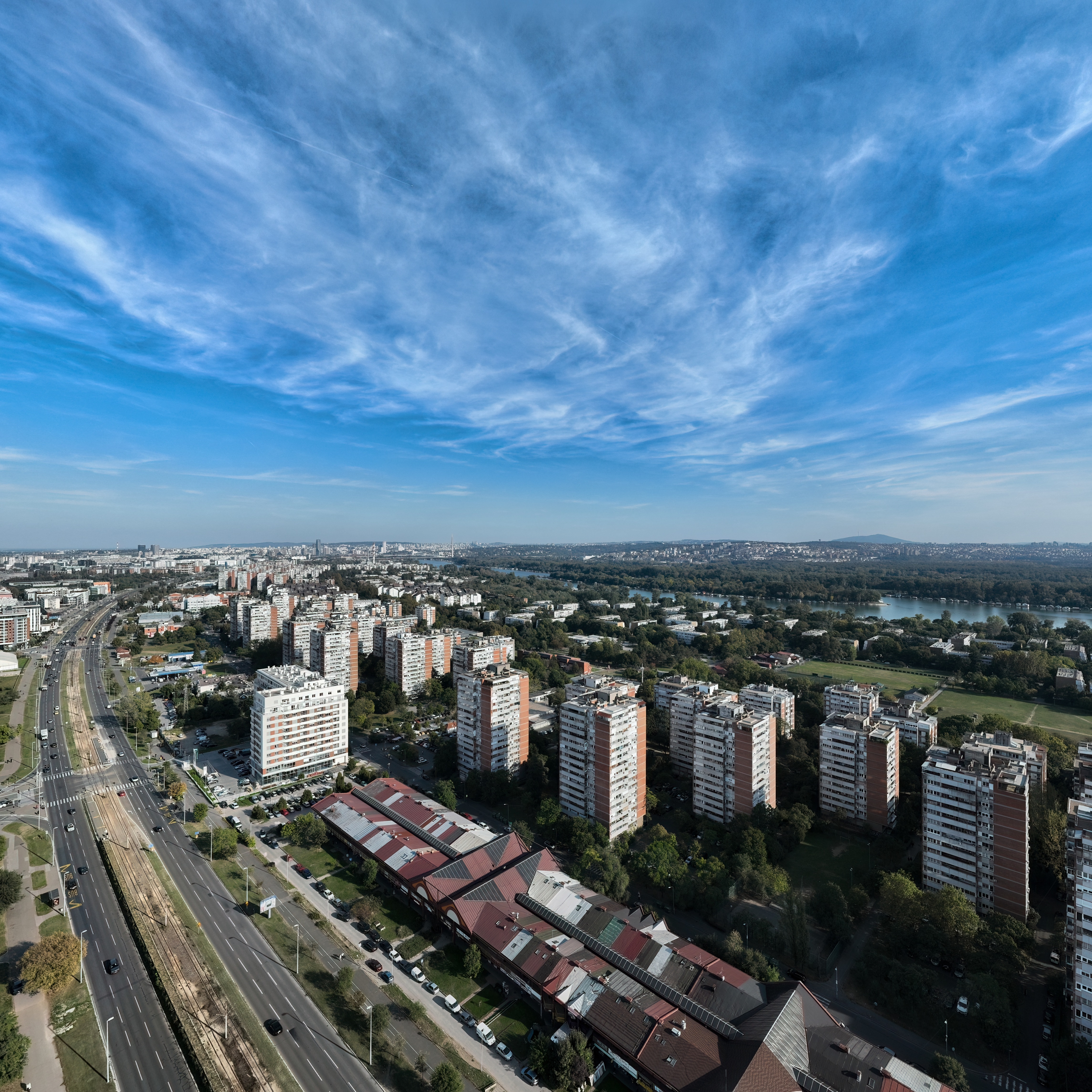
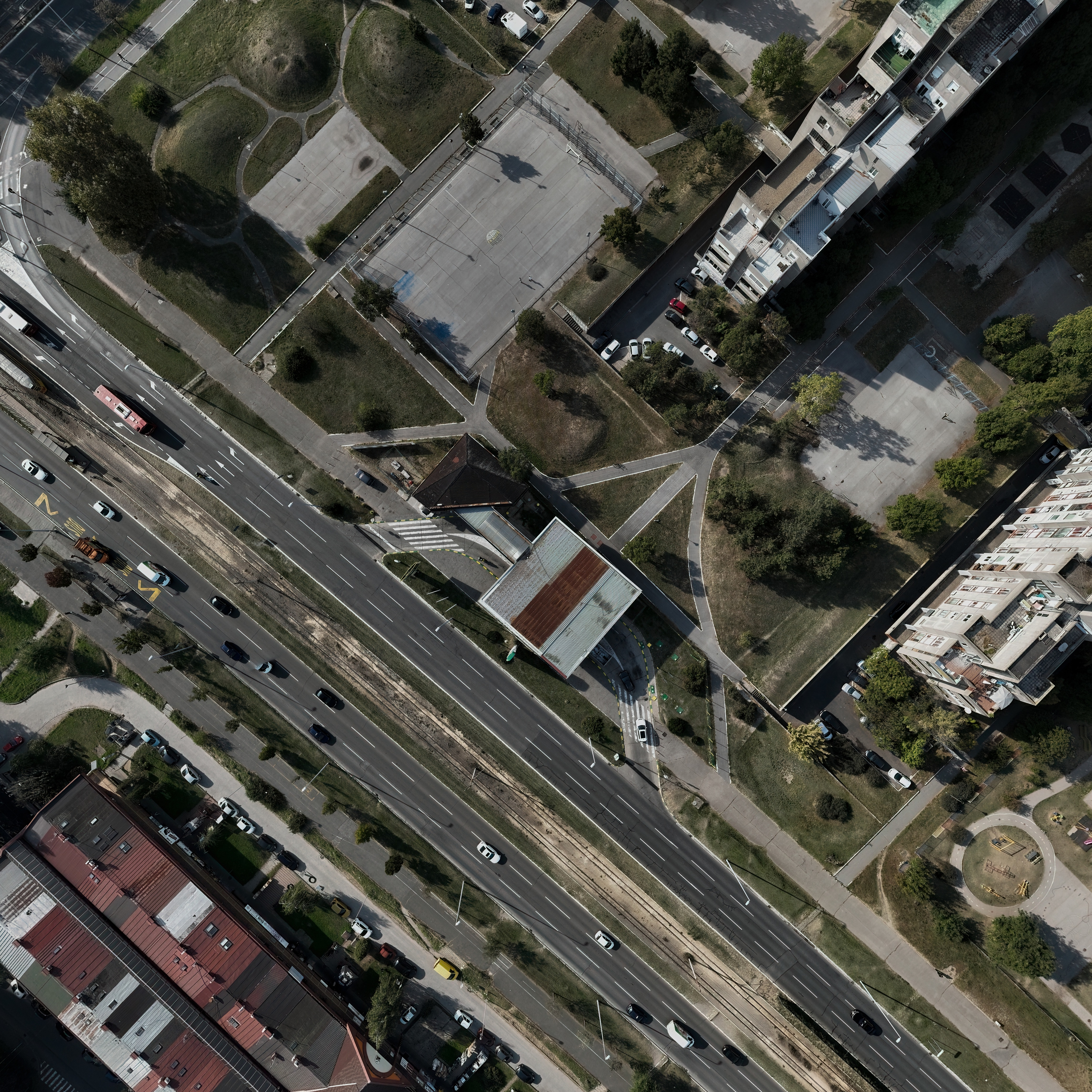
Aerial view on Bežanija skycrapers

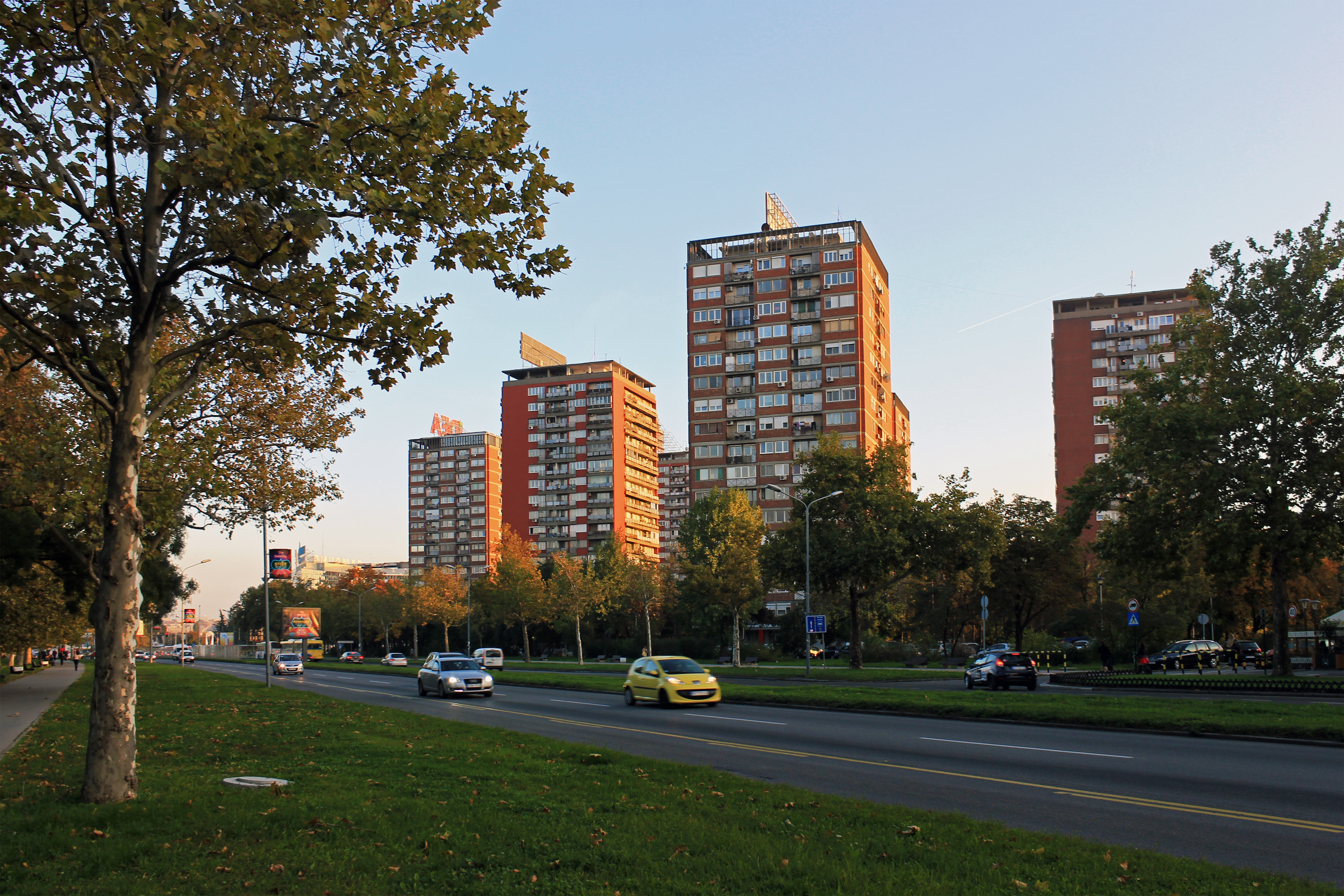
Šest kaplara buildings

Architects who are most deserving for New Belgrade's development are Uroš Martinović, Milutin Glavički, Milosav Mitić, Dušan Milenković and Leonid Lenarčić. They drafted the city's regulatory plan in 1962 which encompassed all the previous ideas, solutions and propositions.

New Belgrade developed on Le Corbusier's principles of the "sun city", which includes many green areas and infrastructure which can easily be upgraded. In general, city developed in the style of urban modern architecture and is considered to be a major representative of that style, along with Brasília in Brazil, Chandigarh in India and Velenje in Slovenia.

Characteristic for the buildings in New Belgrade is that many of them got nicknames. Best known ones include:

- "Šest kaplara" (Six corporals), Block 21, as most apartments were settled by the military personnel and their families;
- "Televizorka" (TV-screen building), Block 28, due to the look of its windows; on 21 March 2020, a fire broke out on the eight floor, ultimately killing seven people;
- "Tri sestre" (Three sisters), Fontana, three identical buildings;
- "Potkovica" (Horseshoe), Block 28, due to its shape;
- "Pendrek", "Sirotica" and "Besna kobila" (Police baton, Poor girl and Mad mare), near Studentski Grad, as the first was populated by the policemen's families, second by the socially endangered and third by the well-to-do members of the Communist party;
- "Mercedes", Block 38, three connected buildings in the shape of the car's logo;
- "Lamela" or "Meander", Block 21; next to "Šest kaplara", with 972.5 m (3,191 ft) it is the longest residential building in former Yugoslavia. It was built from 1960 to 1966 and officially named "B-7", but it is colloquially referred to as the "Great Wall" or "Chinese Wall".

=== Protection ===
The central section of New Belgrade was declared a cultural monument in January 2021, as the protected spatial cultural-historical unit. It includes nine blocks, from No. 21 to No. 30, in three proper rows, three by three (block No. 27 ever existed). The three central ones, 24, 25 and 26, were originally left unbuilt, as they were planned as the three central squares, the main prospekt of the city, with each square given a specific role: ceremonial, central and traffic hub. This was later abandoned and the blocks were urbanized in time. In 2019, the depictions of block No. 23 became part of the permanent exhibition in the New York's Museum of Modern Art. Though this central area was envisioned by the original planners of the city, individual blocks were later designed by other architects. Residential complexes in blocks 22 and 23 were designed by Aleksandar Stjepanović, Božidar Janković and Branislav Karadžić.

Block 23 was built from 1969 to 1976 and was financed by the army. Though in the brutalism style, prevailing in New Belgrade at the time, the design avoided the stripped, rigid rules of the style. The loggias and windows are ornamented with concrete bars, the facades are vertically divided with vertical dividing lines protruding above the gables. The windows have additional horizontal frames. Critics labeled it the "brutalist baroque". The block is conceived as having tall, military buildings on the edge, serving as "sentinels" of the inside, which is filled with rows of buildings in cubical or meandering shapes, including the elementary school "Laza Kostić" which occupies the central part. During the construction, the prefabricated panels of reinforced concrete were used, patented by Branko Žeželj. Interiors are designed in the manner of the "Belgrade apartment" - units with central core which both serves as the living room and connects all other rooms, enabling "family communication".

== Demographics ==
Historical population
Year	Pop.	±%
1948	9,195	—
1953	11,339	+23.3%
1961	33,347	+194.1%
1971	92,200	+176.5%
1981	173,541	+88.2%
1991	224,424	+29.3%
2002	217,773	−3.0%
2011	214,506	−1.5%
2022	209,763	−2.2%

Ever since the construction began in 1948, New Belgrade experienced explosive population growth, but this trend stopped during the 1990s and became negative. As of 2022, the municipality of New Belgrade has a population of 209,763 inhabitants.

=== Ethnic groups ===
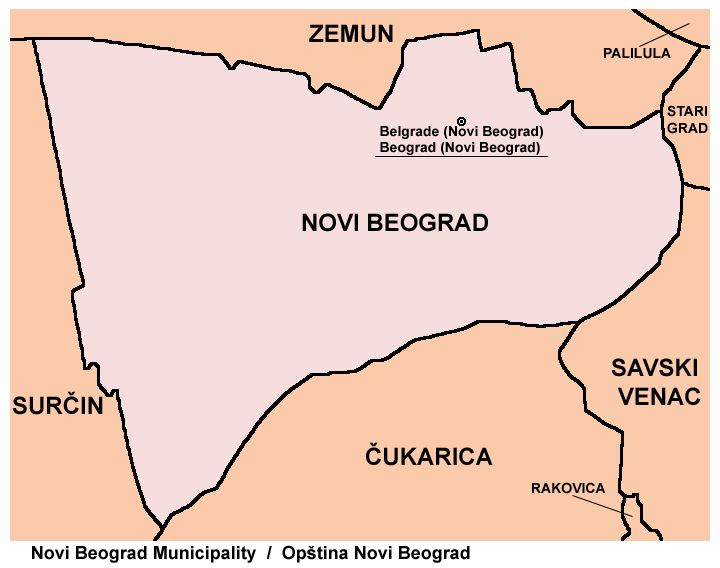
Map of New Belgrade municipality

Map of local communities of New Belgrade as of 2019

The ethnic composition of the municipality (as of 2022)

Ethnic group	Population
Serbs	178,784
Yugoslavs	2,262
Romani	1,598
Russians	1,071
Montenegrins	1,041
Croats	993
Macedonians	753
Muslims	514
Slovenians	259
Bosniaks	270
Hungarians	228
Gorani	228
Albanians	207
Slovaks	125
Bulgarians	125
Romanians	84
Others	6,945
Unknown	14,276
Total	209,763

== Economy ==
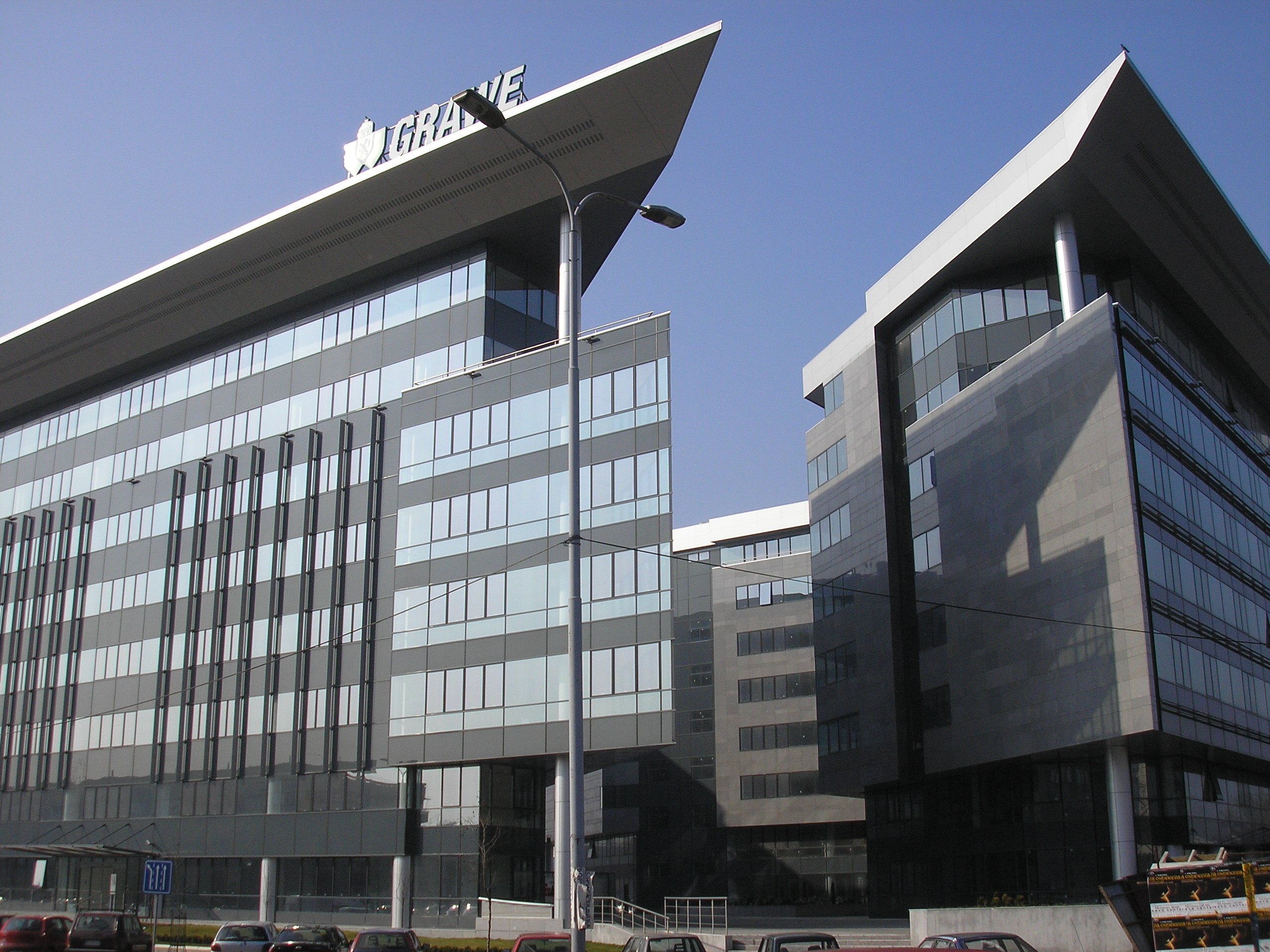
Corner of Block 25

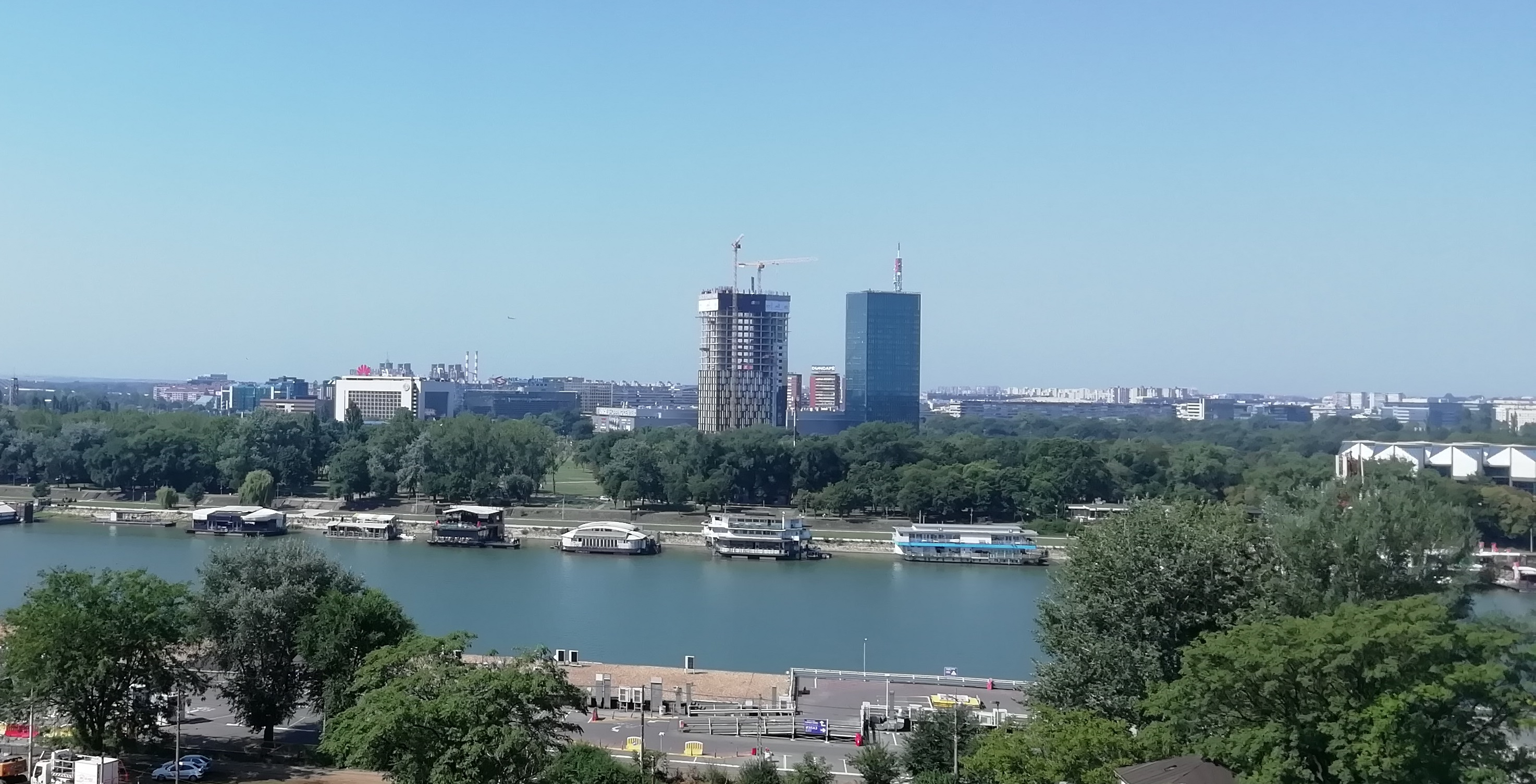
Ušće Towers

As all of the socialist governments considered heavy industry to be the driving force of the entire economy, it for decades dominated New Belgrade's economy too: Industry of Machinery and Tractors (IMT), Metallic cast iron factory (FOM), shipyard "Beograd" (formerly "Tito"), large heating plant in Savski Nasip, "MINEL" electro-construction company, etc. All of these complexes will be removed and develop in business and residential areas.

In the 1990s with the collapse of gigantic state-owned companies, New Belgrade's local economy bounced back by switching to commercial facilities, with dozens of shopping malls and entire commercial sections such as Mercator Center Belgrade, Ušće Mall, Delta City Belgrade etc. These activities are further enhanced in the 2000s (decade). The 'Open Shopping Mall' or the Belgrade's flea market is also located in New Belgrade.

New Belgrade became the Central business district in Serbia and one of major in Southeast Europe. Many companies choose New Belgrade for regional centers such as IKEA, Energoprojekt holding, Delta Holding, MK Group, DHL, Air Serbia, OMV, Siemens, Société Générale, Telekom Srbija, Telenor Serbia, Unilever, Vip mobile, Yugoimport SDPR, Ericsson, Colliers International, CB Richard Ellis, SNC-Lavalin, Hewlett-Packard, Huawei, Ernst & Young and Arabtec. The Belgrade Stock Exchange is also located in New Belgrade. Other notable structures built not too long afterwards include convention and congress hall Sava Center, Hotel Jugoslavija, Genex condominium, Genex Tower sports and concert venues Hala Sportova and Belgrade Arena, and 4 and 5-star hotels Crowne Plaza Belgrade, Holiday Inn, Hyatt Regency, Tulip Inn etc., with around 1700 rooms,... Many structures are currently under construction like Airport City Belgrade, Elektroprivreda Srbije HQ., West 65 business-residential complex, etc.

Many IT companies choose New Belgrade as regional center like NCR Corporation, Cisco Systems, SAP AG, Acer, ComTrade Group, Hewlett-Packard, Huawei, Samsung. One of Microsoft's development centers is also located in New Belgrade.

Currently finished projects in New Belgrade are Delta City, Sava City, Univerzitetsko Selo, Ada Bridge, Intesa HQ and Ušće Tower.

In 2019. average price of square meter of an apartment in New Belgrade was €1.650. Average net salary in New Belgrade in December 2019 was $960. It contains also the most expensive areas for buying an apartment in Belgrade as A Blok (2.920 €) and West 65 (5.000 €).

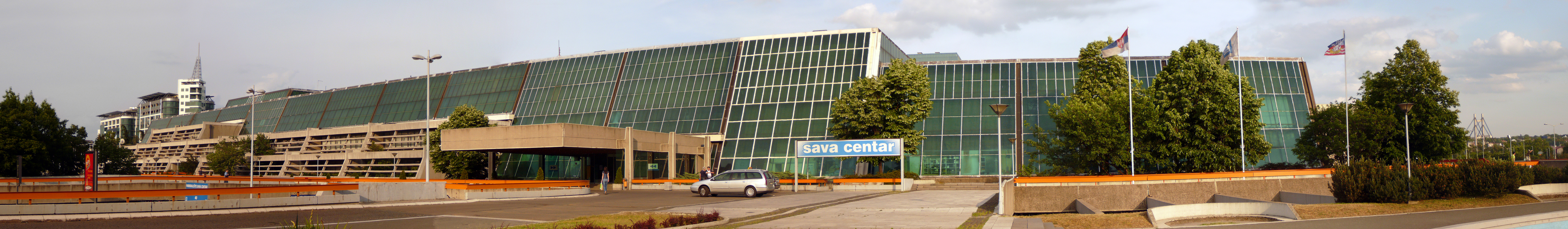
Sava Centar Convention Center built in 1978 and reconstructed in 2023

The following table gives a preview of total number of registered people employed in legal entities per their core activity (as of 2018):

Activity	Total
Agriculture, forestry and fishing	655
Mining and quarrying	283
Manufacturing	7,534
Electricity, gas, steam and air conditioning supply	1,585
Water supply; sewerage, waste management and remediation activities	550
Construction	7,250
Wholesale and retail trade, repair of motor vehicles and motorcycles	28,117
Transportation and storage	7,598
Accommodation and food services	5,147
Information and communication	12,351
Financial and insurance activities	10,518
Real estate activities	1,048
Professional, scientific and technical activities	14,779
Administrative and support service activities	20,949
Public administration and defense; compulsory social security	11,283
Education	4,058
Human health and social work activities	4,768
Arts, entertainment and recreation	2,055
Other service activities	2,373
Individual agricultural workers	31
Total	142,935

== Projects under construction in New Belgrade ==
- Airport City Belgrade – Currently under construction 9 15 storey buildings. Airport Garden residential buildings were started in 2019.
- Blok 23 (T/O) – An investment by Verano of €80 million into a new office building. Currently on hold.
- Bus Station Belgrade - New bus station and terminal building. Construction started in 2018.
- Bel Mondo Residential and office project.
- Delta City District Project starts in 2024. Complex will have 3 towers including one Intercontintal hotel.
- Tempo Tower Project starts in October 2024. Tower is 120m tall.
- Soul 64 Project od 14 residential buildings. Started in 2023.
- Wellport Belgrade - Condominium project, started in 2018. Estimated cost: €130 million.
- SkyGarden Belgrade - Another project set to start in 2018, consisting of residential and office space, as well as a hotel. Investment: €155 million.
- Sakura Park Belgrade - Establishment comprising 228 apartments.
- Merin Tower (prep) - Mixed use tower next to the NCR Campus in Block 42. 28 floors with a height of 100m.

== Transportation ==
Several important thoroughfares run through New Belgrade, along with numerous wide boulevards that criss-cross most of its territory.

The A3 motorway (carrying E70 and E75) runs northwest to southeast, with five exits. It crosses the Sava River via Gazela Bridge. New Belgrade is served by two more road bridges – Branko's Bridge and Ada Bridge, and by the road-tram Old Sava Bridge.

With services started in 1985, tram transportation plays an important role in New Belgrade transportation, despite it having just two tracks which mostly run along the several kilometers long Jurija Gagarina street. Four tram lines serve the municipality (7, 9, 11 and 13) and there is a tram depot in Đorđa Stanojevića street.

Since the 1970s, New Belgrade has been served by two railway lines connecting it to the city center and by one line to Zemun. Virtually the entire length of these lines is on an embankment, with an elevated segment on the approach to the New Railroad Bridge, and a tunnel toward Zemun. Two railway stations exist, the larger being the Novi Beograd which is located above the Antifašističke borbe street and is served by BG Voz and other local and international lines. The other railway station is Tošin Bunar which is a 2-track stop located just outside Bežanija tunnel.

The international fairway on the Sava runs along the banks of New Belgrade. The only public river transportation is run by two seasonal boat lines from Blok 70 to Ada Ciganlija, and by another one connecting Blok 44 to Ada Međica.

Belgrade's main shipyard is located on New Belgrade's Sava bank. On the Danube, the base of the 2nd River Squadron of Serbian River Flotilla is located next to the confluence of the Sava, which restricts navigation around Little War Island.

From 1927 to 1964 the international Dojno polje Airport was located on the territory of today's New Belgrade.

== Politics ==
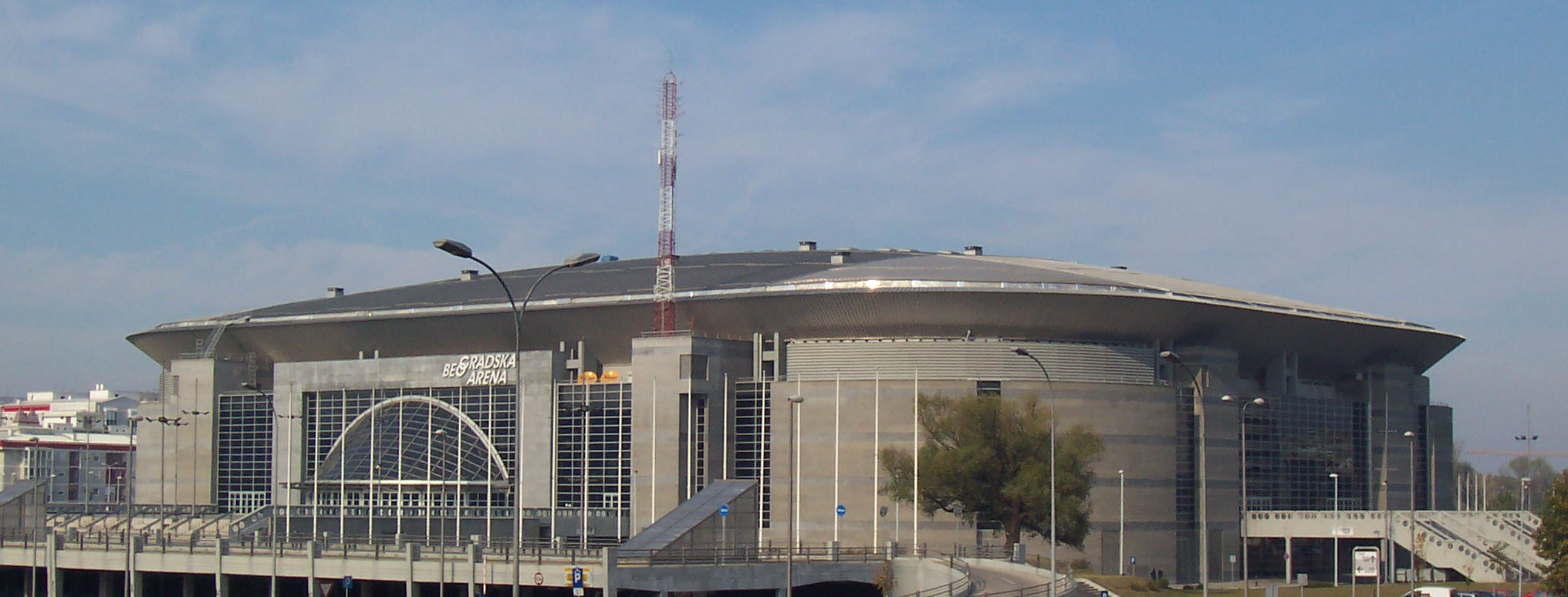
Belgrade Arena

Historical Presidents of the Municipality since 1952:

- 1952–1953: Stevan Galogaža
- 1953–1955: Mile Vukmirović
- 1955–1956: Živko Vladisavljević
- 1956–1957: Ilija Radenko
- 1957–1962: Ljubinko Pantelić
- 1962–1965: Jova Marić
- 1965–1969: Pero Kovačević (born 1923)
- 1969–1979: Novica Blagojević (died 1979)
- 1979–1982: Milan Komnenić
- 1982–1986: Andreja Tejić
- 1986–1989: Toma Marković
- 1989–2000: Čedomir Ždrnja (born 1936)
- 2000–2008: Željko Ožegović (born 1962)
- 2008–2012: Nenad Milenković (born 1972)
- 2012–2022: Aleksandar Šapić (born 1978)
- 2022–present: Bojan Bovan

== Culture and education ==
For a settlement of such size, New Belgrade has some unusual cultural characteristics, influenced by the Yugoslav communists' ideas how a new and modern city should look like. If it can be understood why there were no churches built, a fact that a city of 250,000 has no theaters and only one museum (out of the residential area) is much less comprehensible, underlying the decades long Belgrader's feel of New Belgrade being nothing more but a big dormitory.

Museum of Contemporary Art is located in Ušće which is also projected by the city government as the location of the future Belgrade Opera. The issue became highly controversial in the 2000s (decade) as the general feel of the population, ensemble of the opera and most prominent architects and artists is that it is a very bad location for the opera, while the city government stubbornly insists against the popular wishes.

For decades, the only church in the municipality was an old Church of Saint George in Bežanija. Construction of the new church in Bežanijska Kosa, the Church of Saint Basil of Ostrog, began in 1996, while the construction of the Church of Saint Demetrius of Salonica, which is considered the first church in New Belgrade, began in 1998. Both are still not completed.

=== Schools ===
Education fared much better than culture, as there are numerous elementary and high schools, as well as University of Belgrade's residential campus – Studentski Grad.

List of schools in New Belgrade:

- Graphic Design Secondary School
- Megatrend University
- Ninth Belgrade Gymnasium
- Polytechnical Academy
- Polytechnic-High School for New Sciences
- Russian School
- Technical School
- Tenth Belgrade Gymnasium
- University of Arts' Faculty of Dramatic Arts (FDU)

== Night life ==
New Belgrade offers night life along the banks of Sava and Danube, right up to the point where the two rivers meet. What started mostly as raft-like social clubs for river fishermen in the 1980s expanded into large floats offering food and drink with live turbo folk performances during the 1990s.

Today, it is unlikely that one would walk a 100-metre (330-foot) stretch along the rivers without encountering a float. Some of them grew into entire entertainment complexes rivaling clubs in Belgrade's downtown core. While most of the floats used to be synonymous with turbo folk in what was essentially a stereotypical kafana setting, a recent trend saw many turned into full-fledged clubs on water with elaborate events involving world-famous DJs spinning live music.

== Twin towns – sister cities ==
New Belgrade is twinned with the following cities and municipalities:

- Belfort, France
- Karpoš, North Macedonia
- Xanthi, Greece
- Banja Luka, Bosnia and Herzegovina

== Notable people ==
- Aleksandar Vučić, politician
- Zoran Đinđić, politician
- Nemanja Bjelica, basketballer
- Aleksandar Šapić, politician, former waterpoloist
- Branka Katić, actress

== See also ==
- List of Belgrade neighbourhoods and suburbs
- List of cities in Serbia
- Subdivisions of Belgrade
