= West 65 =

Residential complex in New Belgrade

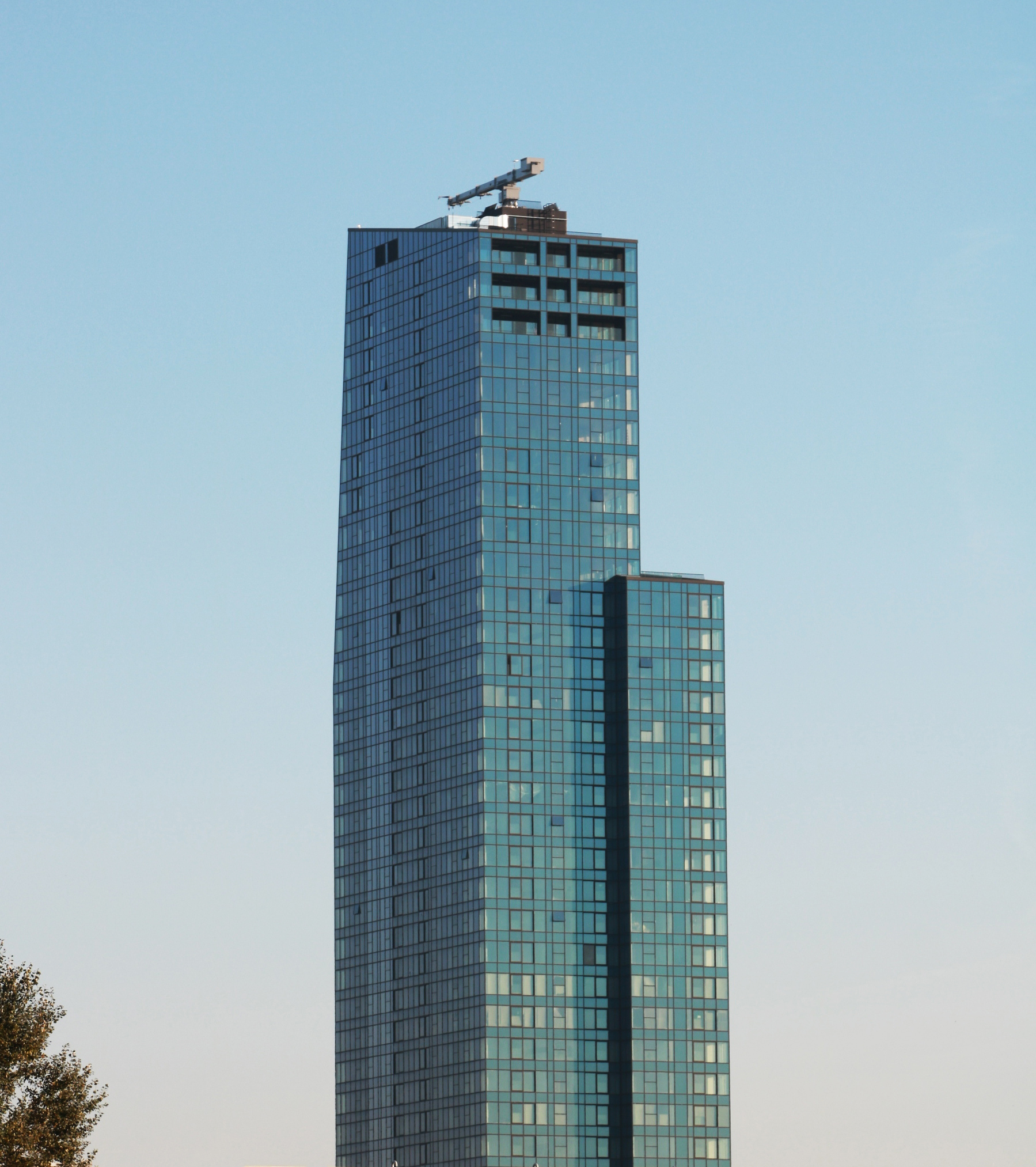
- West 65 tower in 2021
- Interactive map of the West 65 area

General information
- Status: Completed
- Location: Belgrade, Serbia
- Coordinates: 44°48′44.9″N 20°24′05.5″E
- Construction started: 2019
- Completed: 2021

Height
- Height: 155 m (509 ft)

Technical details
- Floor count: 40

Design and construction
- Architecture firm: Fletcher-Priest Company; PSP-Farman Holding

Website
- www.west65.rs/en/west-tower

West 65 is a residential complex in New Belgrade's Blok 65. It is located at the corner of Omladinskih brigada Street and the inner city ring road. The location features a well-developed traffic infrastructure and public transportation network, allowing quick and convenient access to any other part of the city. The immediate vicinity has shopping, office and service centers. The complex is located about 15 minutes from the city center and includes eleven six-story residential buildings, a mall and a 155-metre (509 ft) tower. It was briefly the tallest building in Belgrade and Serbia, before being surpassed by Belgrade Tower in 2021.

== Commercial section ==
The commercial section of the complex consists of retail shops located on the ground floor of the residential buildings and a modern shopping center. It is modeled after pedestrian zones. It will include a supermarket, speciality stores, retail shops, catering and service facilities, a spa and wellness center, and entertainment facilities for children, teenagers and adults.

On 25 December 2021, Novak Djokovic played tennis on the street outside the West 65 Tower.

== Multipurpose tower ==
In accordance with the architectural concept, the corner of Omladinskih brigada Street and the inner city ring road will have one of the tallest and most modern buildings in Belgrade. The tower will consist of two separate units. The tower, which is 155 metres (509 ft) tall and contains 40 floors, is completely residential.

Despite the prizes awarded to the design of the building, it echoed the problems with previous residential and partly residential towers in Belgrade. They include capacity and maintenance of the elevators, quality of structure's installations, lower quality of materials for the cost cutting purposes, or thermal and sound isolation, despite the prices reaching extreme heights for Serbian standards, with up to €5,000 /m2. Also, the investors advertised that project will include a swimming pool within the building and various luxury facilities, but none of them were built in the end. As similar problems plagued previous highrise complexes, Eastern City Gate (built 1971–1979) and Western City Gate (built 1973–1976), it raised a question whether residents should live in the buildings designed as the symbols and landmarks.

== Statistics ==
- Land plot area: 30,316 m^{2}
- Superstructure area: 106,106 m^{2}
- Substructure area: 46,331 m^{2}
- Number of apartments: 514
- Number of retail shops: 100
- Office space and hotel suite total area: 37,058 m^{2}
- Number of parking places: 1,324
- Open space area: 15,484 m^{2}
- Number of new plant units: 172

== Gallery ==
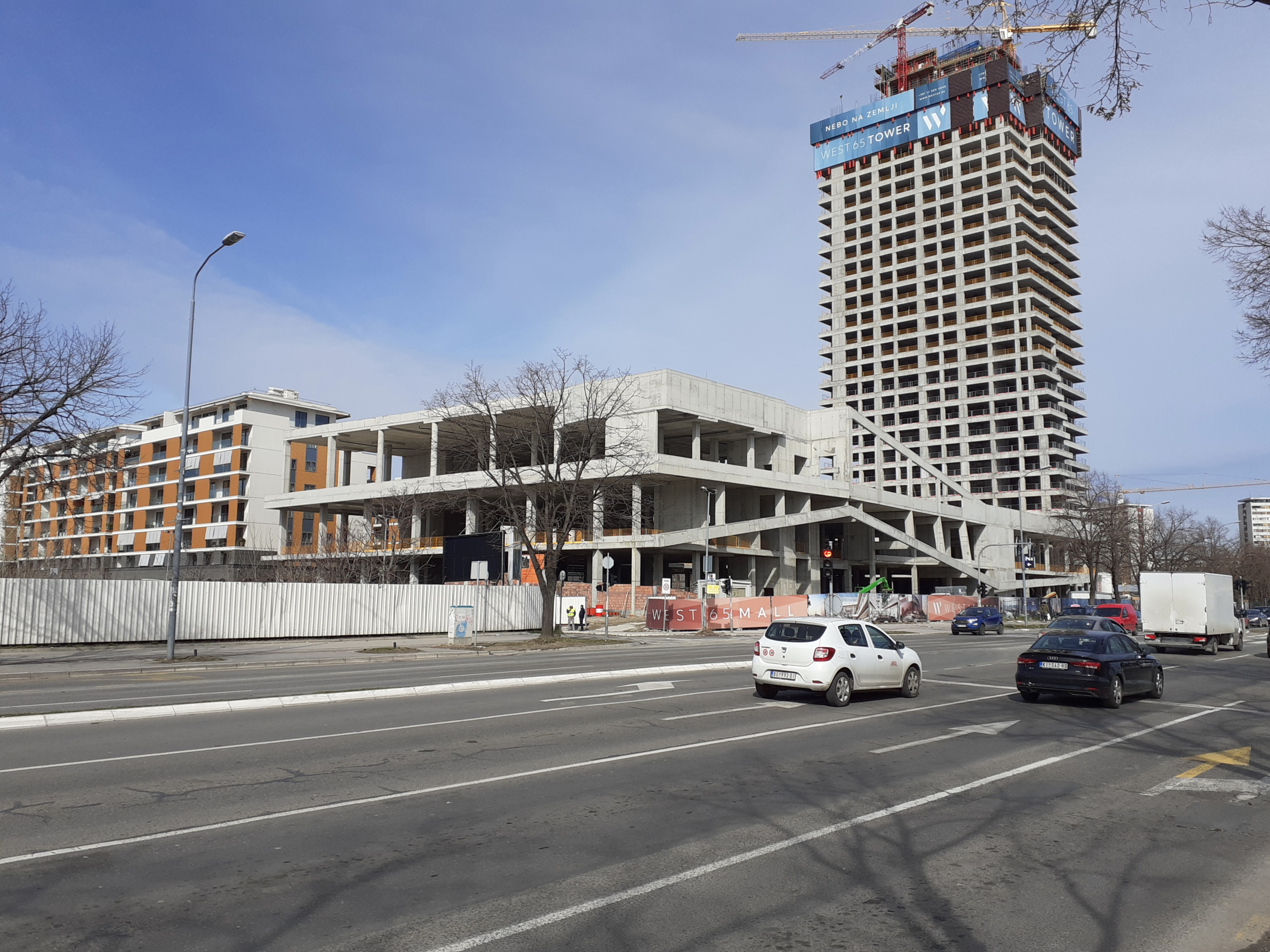
West 65 tower under construction, February 2020

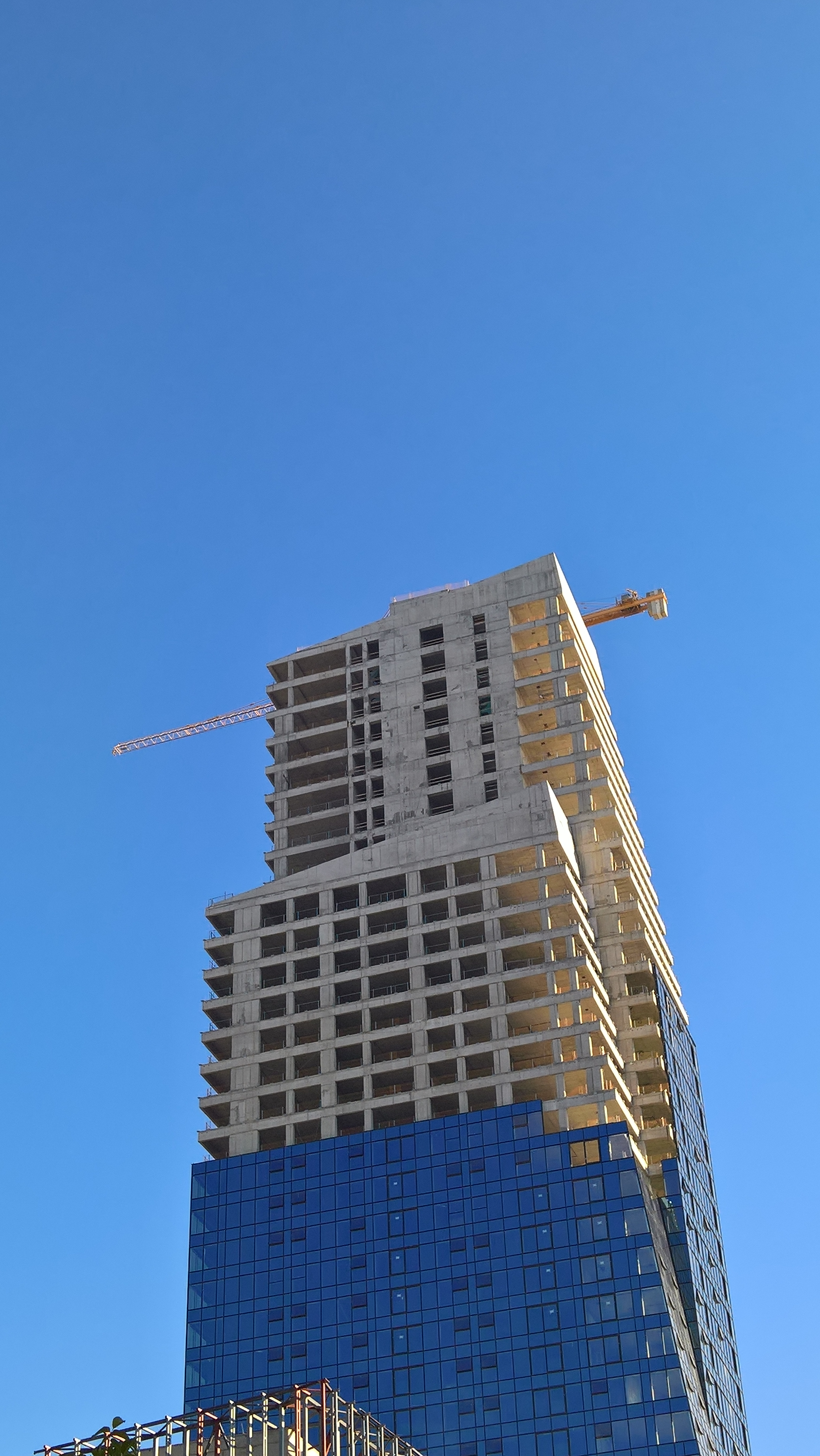
West 65 tower under construction, September 2020

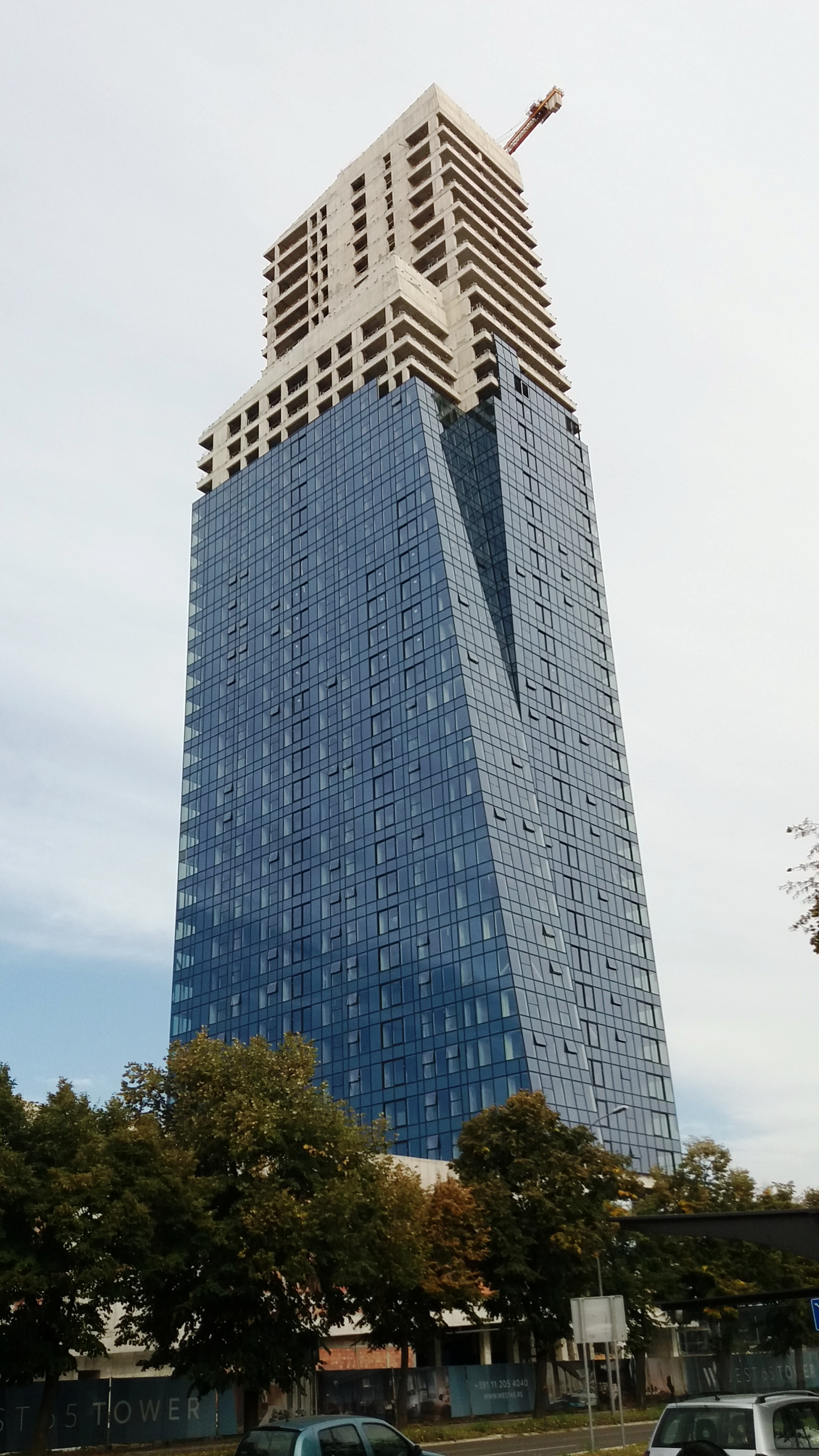
West 65 tower under construction, October 2020

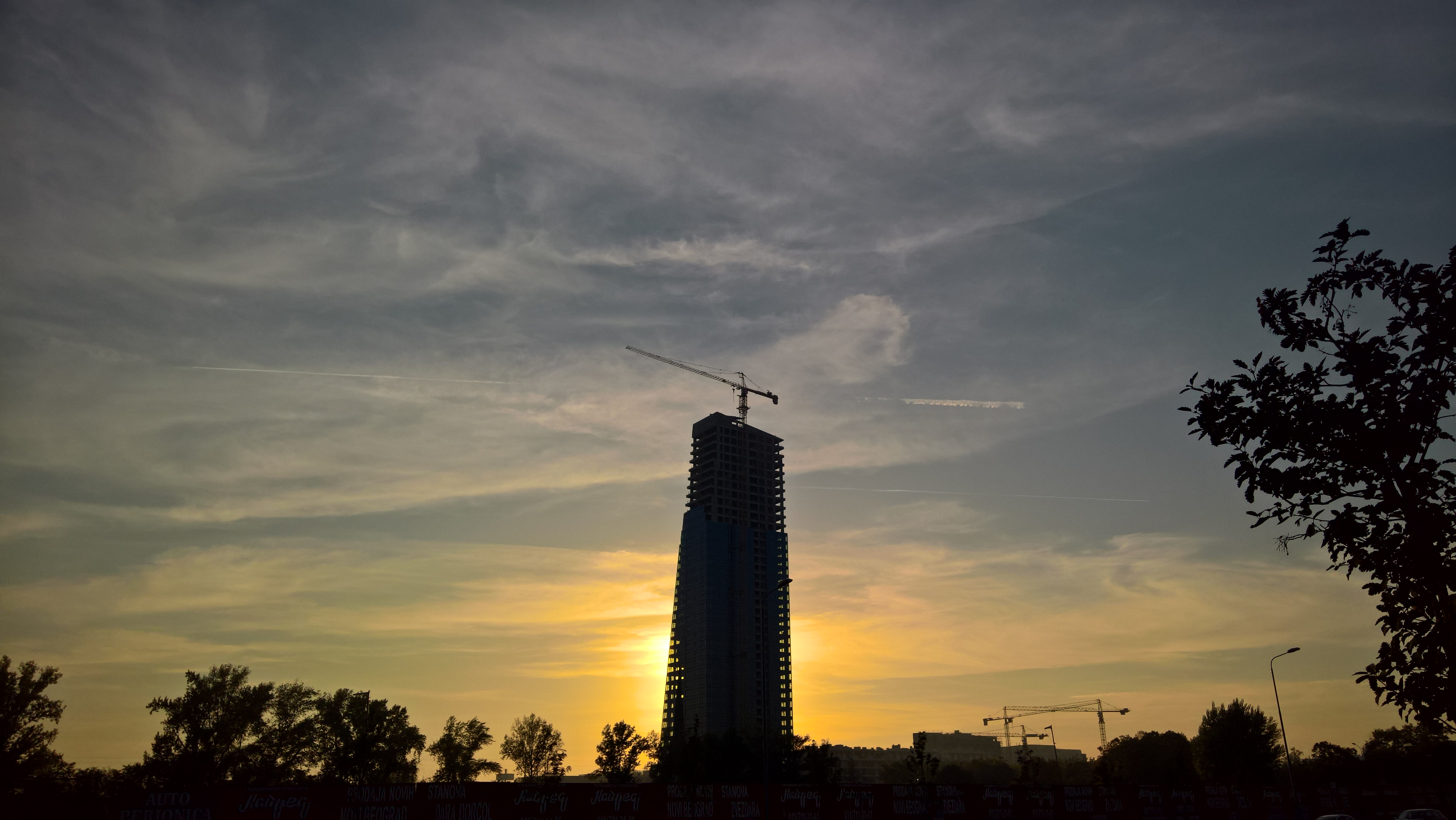
West 65 tower silhouette, October 2020

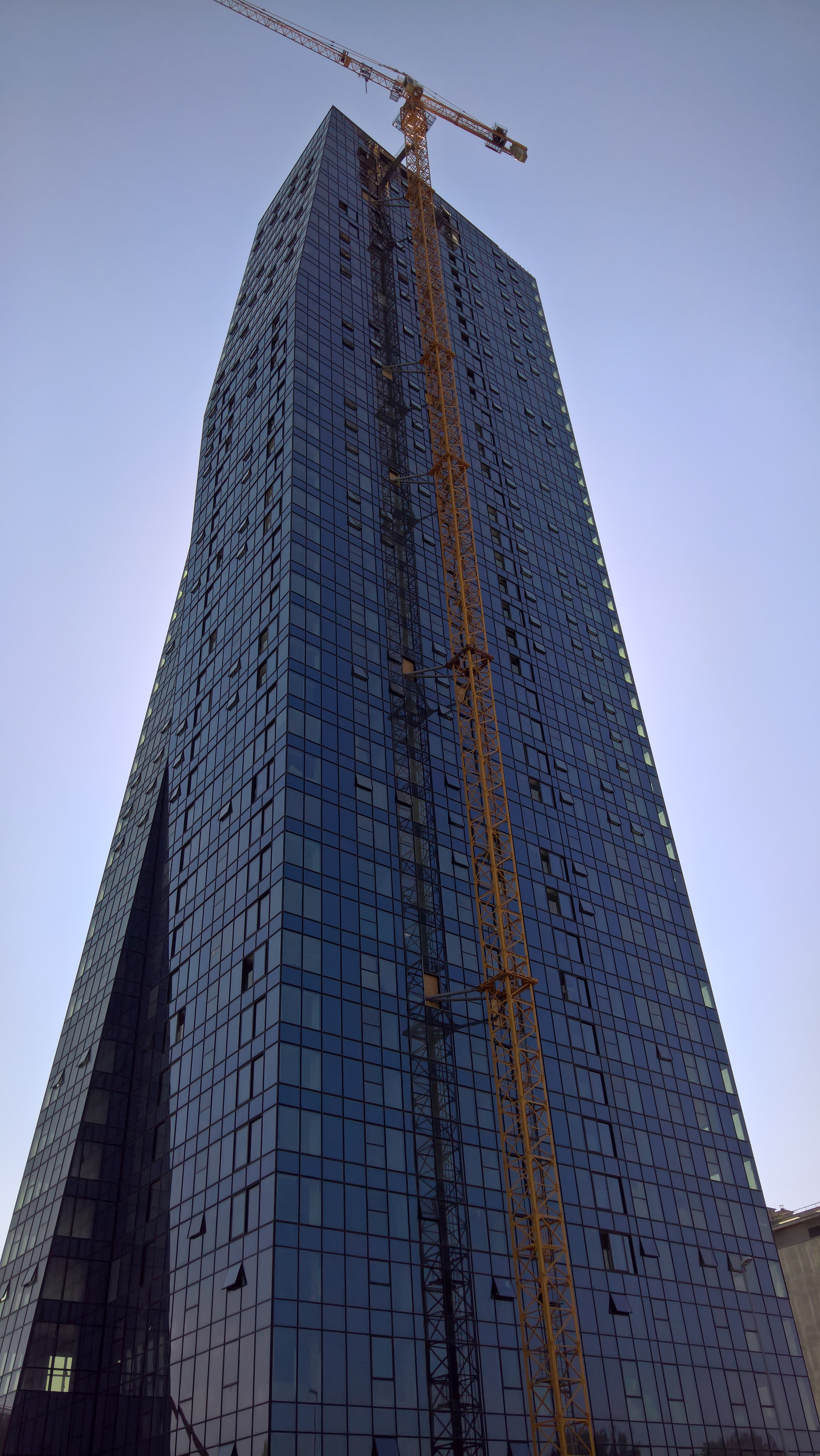
West 65 tower under construction, July 2021
