= Polytechnic-High School for New Sciences =

Belgrade polytechnic high school

Polytechnic-School for the new science (Serbian: Politehnika-Škola za nove tehnologije; Политехника-Школа за нове технологије) is a high school located in Polytechnical Academy-Zemun, Serbia.

Pupils enter school by taking Serbian High school examination. The school is futuristic organized- "4 years" programme consisting of computer application in mechanical engineering, programming on CNC machines, and robotics.

== Education ==
11.04.2006: Polytechnic-School for the new science is an independent school. The school is unique in Serbia. There is laboratory for programming, graphic simulation, computer graphics, and a CNC lab. "Polytechnic" students are taking places in blood donations, tournaments and sport activities in Belgrade.
