= Škoda Tower =

Coordinates: 44°48′43″N 20°26′39″E

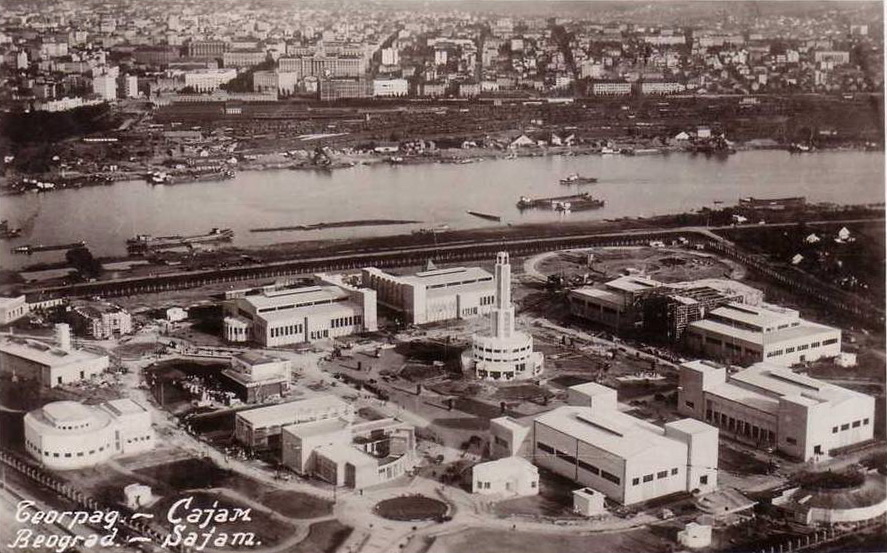
Sajmište before the Škoda tower was built. The tower was constructed in the circular area located in the center-right section

The Škoda Tower (Serbian: Шкодин торањ / Škodin toranj) was a steel construction for exhibition parachuting within the Sajmište complex in Belgrade, the capital of Kingdom of Yugoslavia (today Serbia). During its existence from June 1938 to November 1945, it was the tallest structure in Belgrade with the height of 74 metres (243 ft), and was advertised as the tallest facility of its kind in both Europe and the world. It took almost 30 years before another structure in Belgrade surpassed this height, until the 101 metres (331 ft) tall Beograđanka building was completed in 1974.

== Origin ==
From 6 June to 11 September 1937, the Sajmište complex was built on the left bank of the Sava, across the old section of Belgrade. It was the first planned neighborhood of what would become New Belgrade after World War II. Ultra modern and artistic compound with pavilions and a spiked Central tower hosted Belgrade Fair, and numerous international exhibitions, including military and car shows, and an early exhibition of television.

Based on the plan from 1932, and endorsed by the king Alexander I in 1934, Yugoslav government in 1937 signed a deal with the Czechoslovak Škoda Works for the purchase of 300 tanks. As a gesture of thanks, the company decided to donate the towering construction as the parachuting attraction. The Sajmište was selected as Czechoslovakia already had its exhibition pavilion at the fairground, but also as from 28 May to 13 June 1938, a large International Aviation Exhibition was held with aircraft industries from 11 countries (including United Kingdom, Italy, France and Germany) being represented. At the time, construction of the tower was praised as the supreme move of advertisement.

== Opening ==
The "parachutists tower" was opened on 2 June 1938. It was the latest addition to the fairground complex, dedicated with pompous and lavish ceremony. The latticed steel construction was 74 metres (243 ft) tall, becoming the tallest structure in Belgrade. The tower was an imposing and domineering structure, which, due to its height and position in the flat and low terrain, was visible from all parts of Belgrade from across the river.

It was used both for the professional training of the parachutists, but also for the amateur jumps by the fair visitors. An elevator was transporting jumpers up to the jumping platforms, where the parachute was installed. The parachute was tied with an elastic cable to the secured platform, resembling rather modern bungee jumping, so anyone could use it to land down. The jumping platforms were located at the heights of 40 metres (130 ft) and 60 metres (200 ft). After testing jumps, the first official parachutist was a woman, Katarina Matanović. In the first year of use 3,164 jumps were conducted from the tower.

== World War II ==
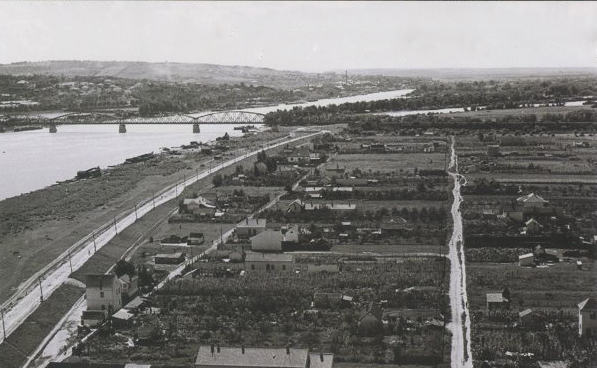
View from the tower on the developing Sajmište settlement. Old Railway Bridge, almost barren Banovo Brdo, Mala Ciganlija, Ada Ciganlija, and distant chimneys of the Čukarica sugar refinery are all visible

After the Axis invasion of Yugoslavia in April 1941 during World War II, German occupational forces adapted the Sajmište complex into the concentration camp originally called Jewish camp in Zemun (Judenlager Semlin), which colloquially became known as the Sajmište concentration camp. When the camp was established, the tower was equipped with searchlights and several machine gun nests to monitor the area and the river, and to stop those trying to escape the lager. The structure gained a moniker "death tower".

It escaped all heavy bombardments of Belgrade during the war, including German bombing in April 1941, and Allied Easter bombing in April 1944, when majority of the camp itself was destroyed, but the tower survived. During the Belgrade offensive in October 1944, Politika's photographer Vladeta Limić took photos of the fighting at the tower during the battle for expelling the Germans out of Belgrade. The tower survived those clashes, too.

== Demolition ==
Though it survived the war, the new Communist authorities decided in the late 1945 to demolish the tower, sending German war prisoners to tear it down. Reasons for such decision remained unknown. It is usually suggested that this has been done due to the highly negative perception among the residents because of the role the tower had during the war years, as it is estimated that up to 23,000 people perished in the Sajmište concentration camp. One of the last photos of the tower was from October 1945, when military units were making preparations for the 20 October parade, marking the first anniversary of the liberation of Belgrade. Several weeks later it was wired and demolished.

Demolition of the tower left Palace Albanija, built in 1939, only one year after the tower, as the tallest structure in Belgrade with its 53 metres (174 ft). The next Belgrade structure that would surpass the height of the Škoda tower will be built only in 1974, when the 101 metres (331 ft) tall Beograđanka building was finished.

The tower was located in the southeast corner of the complex, next to the road along the Sava river, where the modern Old Sava Bridge, built in 1942, crosses the river. Nothing remained of the structure, and a football pitch of FK Brodarac was built on its location.

== See also ==
- Staro Sajmište
- Sajmište concentration camp
