= Palace Albanija =

High-rise building in Belgrade, Serbia

Coordinates: 44°48′54″N 20°27′36″E

Palace Albanija (Palace of the Merchant's Fund)
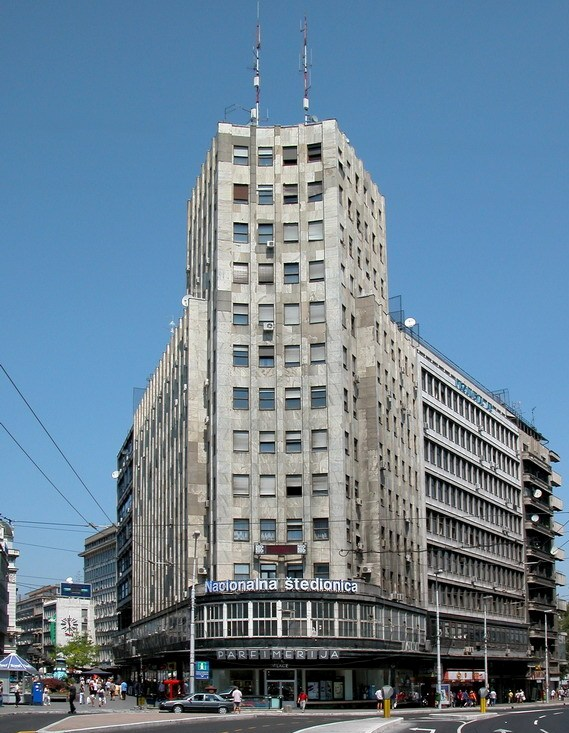
- Palace of the Merchant's Fund on Terazije

- Location within Belgrade

General information
- Architectural style: Modernist style
- Location: Belgrade, Serbia
- Construction started: 16 July 1938; 88 years ago
- Completed: 20 October 1939; 87 years ago

Height
- Height: 53 m (174 ft)

Technical details
- Floor count: 13

Design and construction
- Architect: Miladin Prljević
- Structural engineer: Đorđe Lazarević
- Other designers: Branko Bon; Milan Grakalić; Hinko Bauer; Marijan Haberle
- Main contractor: Mortgage Bank of the Merchant's Fund

Palace Albanija (Serbian: Палата Албанија, Palata Albanija, literally "Palace Albania") is a high-rise building in Belgrade, Serbia. It was built in 1939 as the Palace of the Mortgage Bank of the Merchant's Fund (abbreviated: the Palace of the Merchant's Fund). Important construction and architectural innovations were incorporated into the project, which made Albanija an exceptional building endeavor in the Balkans. When completed in 1939, it was the first skyscraper in Southeast Europe. It remained the tallest building in Belgrade for 3 years, until being surpassed by BIGZ building in 1941. It remained the tallest building in the old part of Belgrade for the next 34 years, until being surpassed by the Beograđanka ("Palace Belgrade") in 1974.

Palace Albanija was declared a cultural monument in 1984. As for its importance for Belgrade, it was built on the pronouncedly dominant architectural position, marking the spatial-urban accent of Terazije square, which made it one of the most recognizable symbols of Belgrade. It was also described as the symbol of Belgrade's golden age, and the crown of the economic growth of Belgrade during Interbellum.

== Location ==
It is located at the north-west end of Terazije square, at the forking of four streets: Terazije, Kolarčeva, starting point of Knez Mihailova and Sremska. The latter two are pedestrian zones. In the vicinity are the Republic Square, to which both the Kolarčeva and Knez Mihailova lead, historical neighborhood of Obilićev Venac along the Knez Mihailova, and busy commercial neighborhood of Zeleni Venac, via Sremska. Palace Albanija directly faces another major edifice on Terazije, Hotel Moskva.

The buildings officially has three addresses in two streets: 2 Knez Mihailova, 4 Knez Mihailova and 12 Kolarčeva streets.

== History ==
=== Origin ===
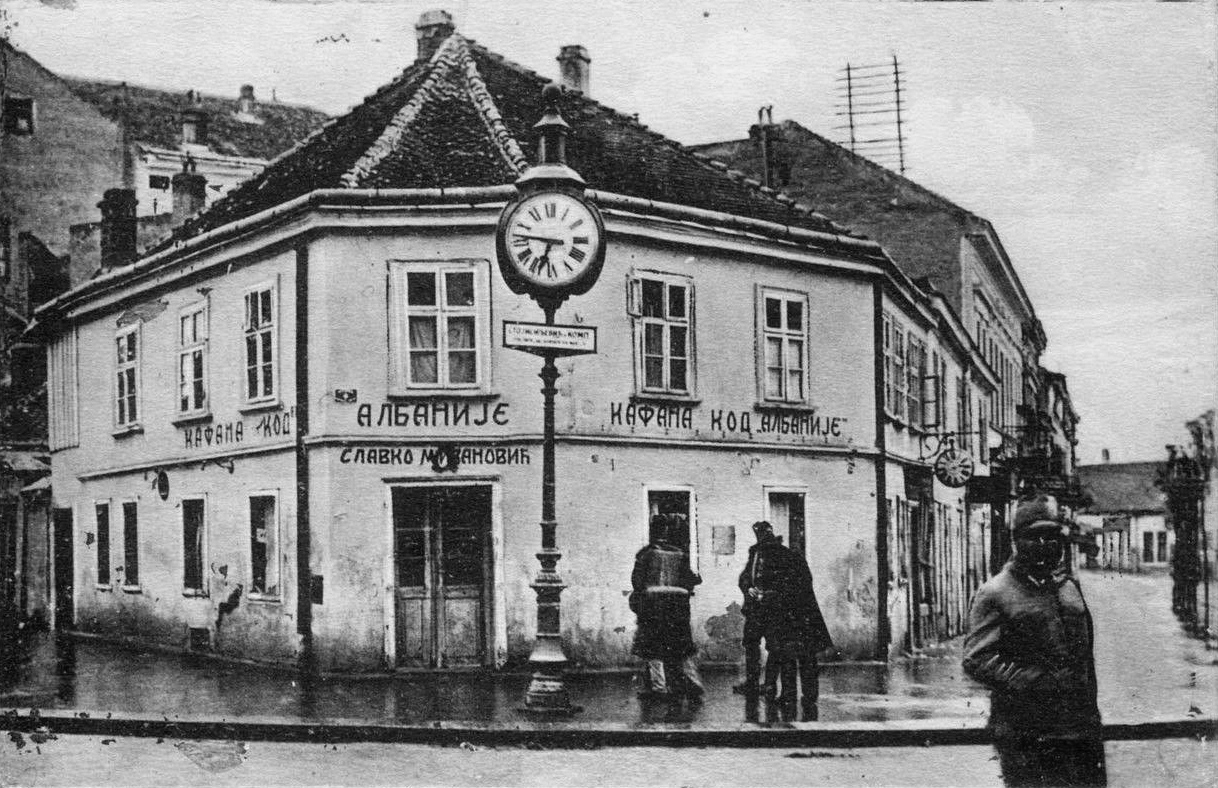
Old kafana Kod Albanije in the 1910s, with the Belgrade's first public clock in front

The location of the Palace Albanija building had previously been occupied by a kafana named "Kod Albanije" ("Chez Albania"), which was built in 1860. It was a small, unsightly, crummy house, yet the venue was very popular. The kafana was built in oriental, Turkish style, with yellow façade and its original clientele included Ottoman seymen, merchants, hirelings, Serbian guardsmen, etc.

The clock in front of the kafana was the first public clock in Belgrade. As such, it became the most popular meeting point in the city. According to the Belgrade's first general urban plan, from 1924, the location was planned for the Belgrade Stock Exchange Building.

The owners, descendants of Krsta Tomović, were refusing to sell the lot by asking too much money for the parcel's 650 m^{2} (7,000 sq ft). In 1936, the Mortgage Bank of the Merchant's Fund paid 8.5 million dinars for the lot, which was enough money to purchase 7 one-floor villas in the city's affluent villa populated neighborhood of Krunski Venac. The bank was drained so much by this transaction, that it took two years for it to recuperate, announcing the architectural design competition on 14 January 1938, with extremely short deadline, set for 28 February same year. In total, 84 architects participated in the competition. Architect Milan Zloković proposed even higher edifice (15 storeys).

The first prize wasn't awarded, which was kind of the usual action at the time, as it allowed for the investor to combine all the other projects. Nine works in total were chosen. Architect Miladin Prljević was chosen to combine the final design. He decided to go with two projects by the architects from Zagreb, one by Branko Bon and Milan Grakalić, and another by Hinko Bauer and Marijan Haberle. This caused the controversy as Bon and Grakalić claimed that their project was robbed, but Prljević replied that they actually robbed the project of Bauer and Haberle, where they worked as the assistants. The original documentation is not preserved so it is not known who plagiarized who. The bank already allocated the funds for the construction, so it pushed hard for the works to begin.

Though small but highly popular, the demolition of the old kafana sparked mass demonstrations in 1938. Despite its shabbiness and lack of sanitary and safety conditions, it existed on this location for almost 80 years. One of the regular customers was writer Branislav Nušić, who wrote about the kafana. Another reason for the protests was that the source for the new building's design was Germanic. Nušić wrote in 1929 that the kafana will "stay forever".

Parts of the public opposed the project citing reasons other than just the kafana demolition. Some reports claimed that such a large building, made of reinforced concrete, can't be supported by the settling ground below, so they predicted the building would collapse, so as the neighboring buildings. Others debunked the new, highly progressive construction techniques. Cases of residents from the surrounding building, who sold their apartments in the fear of possible collapse, were recorded. Newspapers described the repeated design competition as "anything goes".

=== Construction ===
The project envisioned four floors below the ground. As the city government had no machinery required for the job, they invited the Kalmyks, emigrants from Russia, noted for their horses. With their horses and carts, the Kalmyks removed the rubble and earth from the foundation pit.

In the relatively shallow depth, just below the old foundation, a well preserved skeleton of a mammoth was excavated in 1938, below the former door of the kafana. It was estimated to be 2 million years old, when the area of Belgrade was the edge of a Quaternary lake. The skeleton was almost undisturbed, with especially well preserved mandible with teeth, which were used to identify the species. The ribs and femurs were also in excellent shape. The bones were transported to the Museum of Serbian Land.

Engineer Đorđe Lazarević, expert on statics, applied state of the art technics at the time. In the concrete supporting columns, he built it the expensive steel reinforcement, high above the standards in Belgrade in this period. Other above-standard solution included the high-strength concrete.

Construction of the building began on 16 July 1938. It was finished 15 months later, and ceremonially opened on 20 October 1939, when World War II already began in other parts of Europe. It was the first highrise building in Belgrade and for a long time the tallest one, dominating the architecture of Belgrade of the time.

Though the tallest building, Albanija wasn't the tallest structure in Belgrade. The Škoda Tower, donated by the Czechoslovak Škoda Works company after a lucrative 1937 deal with the Yugoslav government, was opened on 2 June 1938, one year before Palace Albanija. The latticed steel construction was 74 metres (243 ft) tall. It was located in the new fairground Sajmište complex across the Sava river, as the nucleus of the modern New Belgrade. The imposing and domineering structure was visible from all parts of Belgrade due to its height and position in the flat and low terrain. After German occupation in April 1941, Sajmište was turned into the concentration camp. The tower managed to survive World War II, but was demolished in November 1945, presumably because of the highly negative perception it had built up due to the role the tower had during the war years. During the war, it was equipped with searchlights and several machine gun nests to monitor the area and the river, earning the moniker "death tower". This left Albanija as the truly highest structure in Belgrade.

=== World War II and aftermath ===
The building was hit during the heavy "Easter bombing“ of Belgrade by the Allies on 16 April 1944. Germans defended it fiercely during the 1944 Belgrade Offensive against the Red Army and Yugoslav Partisan forces. In the evening of 19 October 1944, 22-years-old Partisan Mladen Petrović placed the Yugoslav flag with red star on the top of Palace Albanija. Petrović was wounded while bringing the flag to the top of the building, but recuperated enough to participate in Syrmian Front, where he was killed, together with his brother. Taking over the building opened the way for the Partisan army to the Belgrade Fortress and allowed the charge which liberated the wider area surrounding the Belgrade Main railway station, so just one day later the entire Belgrade was liberated.

After the war, engineer Lazarević participated in the reconstruction of the building. The façade was fully reconstructed from war scars only in 1958, when the original, Italian marble, was replaced with the cheaper, domestic one. The building later became the seat of Beogradska Banka.

=== 21st century ===
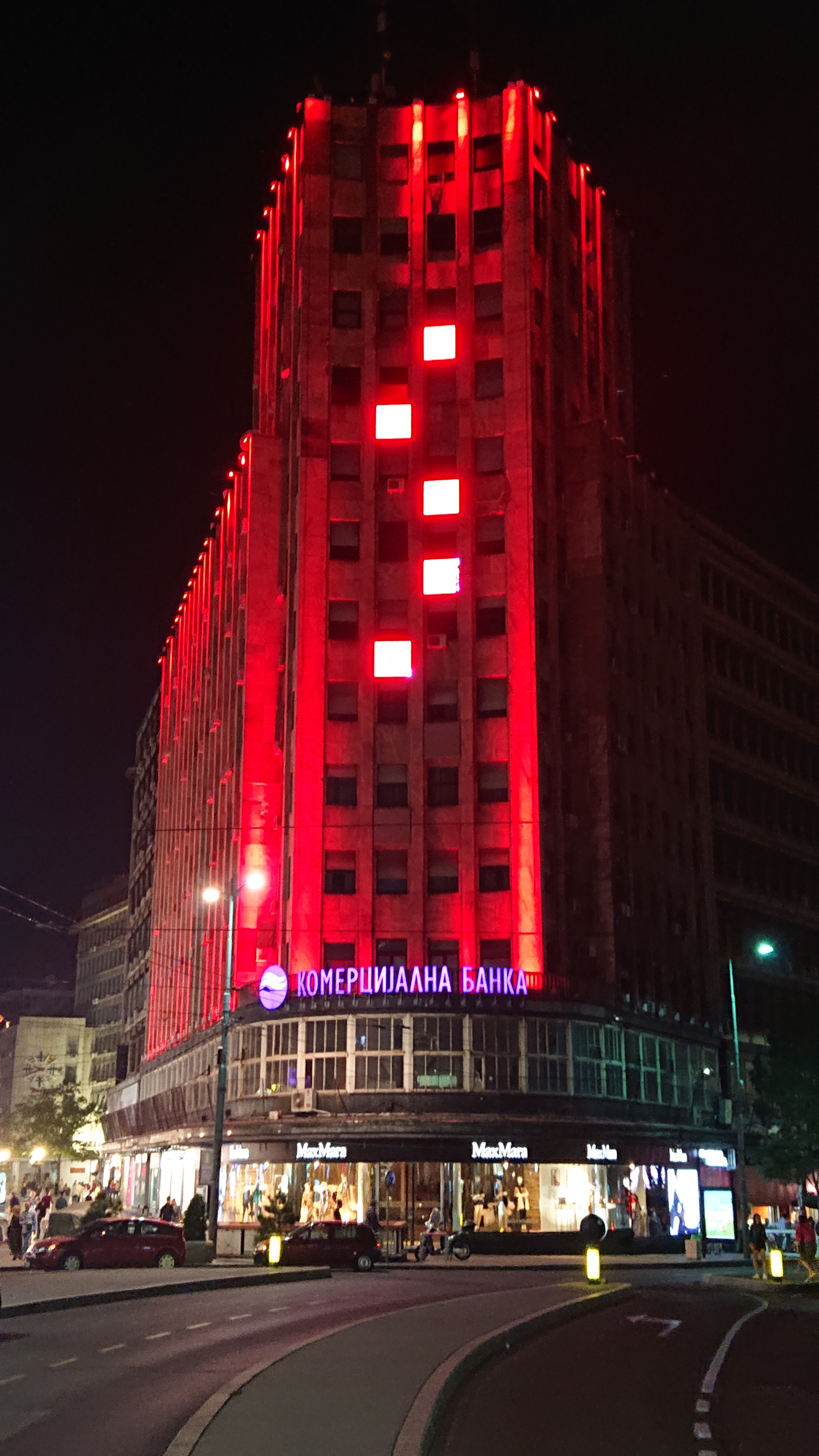
Palace Albanija by night under the decorative lights

In the 2010s, the façade was equipped with the decorative lights. They are also used to color the façade in different patterns and shapes in order to celebrate or commemorate certain events.

Beogradska Banka started a bankruptcy procedure in 2002, which is still not finished, but ever since then the bank has been closed and the building hasn't been properly maintained. In May 2019, the pieces of the façade began to fall off. The Institute for the protection of the monuments stated that the drafting of the project will be done in 2020, without setting a date when will the thorough reconstruction start. The institute also instructed the bank what needs to be done as the "first aid" before the total reconstruction, but the bank which has been non-operational for 17 years, has no funds for it. As the city is not the owner of the building, the complete reconstruction is not an option, but in December 2019 city announced reconstruction of the façade, which should be finished in 2021.

== Architecture ==
Albanija was patterned after the project Hochhaus in Berlin, designed by Hans Poelzig. Prljević previously collaborated with Poelzig. The building originally had four basement floors: the boiler room, storage rooms for the tenants and two for the storage rooms of the shops. The lobby was designed to host 10 different shops and the mezzanine was designated for the restaurant. Up to the fourth floor were offices and from the fifth to the eights floor were mixed offices and three-room apartments. Remaining five stores, to the thirteenth, were occupied by the bachelor apartments, which, at the time, occupied around 50 m^{2} (540 sq ft) each. This final five floor section was referred to as the tower, as it protruded above the lower, wider part of the building.

The building is 53 m (174 ft) high, with 13 floors above the ground and 4 floors below. Total floor area covers 8,000 m^{2} (86,000 sq ft).

It was designed in the pattern of the late Modernist style ("international spirit of the Modernism in the 1930s"). The façade is without any ornaments and was plated with the slabs of the blue-gray Italian Cipollino marble, which was partially replaced during the 1958 reconstruction from damages sustained during World War II.

The bombing of the building during the war proved the quality of its construction. The German Organization Todt built the shelter in the basement of the building. The 500 kg (1,100 lb) heavy US bomb hit the roof of Albanija directly, fell all the way down to the basement, killing many German soldiers and officers in the shelter. The building, however, remained standing. Remaining soldiers were killed in the battle with the Yugoslav Partisans and the Soviet Red Army.

== Birds ==
In June 2018 it was announced that 3 nesting couples of Alpine swift were spotted on the building, which is the first time this happened in Belgrade. Previously, the closest nesting colony of Alpine swift was 200 km (120 mi) to the east, in the Iron Gates gorge. They were first spotted flying in the flocks of common swift, which are abundant in the city, and later the nests were found. This is taken as one of the hints that the continental climate of Belgrade changes, shifting to the Mediterranean climate.

== Twin projects ==
=== House of merchant Zdravković ("Little Albanija") ===
The similar building, recently colloquially styled "Little Albanija" (Mala Albanija), is located at the corner of the Pop Lukina and Kosančićev Venac streets. It was also designed by architect Miladin Prljević. Though originally only one skyscraper was planned, it was later decided that three buildings will be built, sharing the same or similar appearance and characteristics. The architectural design of the Little Albanija is patterned after the Palace Albanija and represents its smaller version. The building is officially known as the "House of Siniša Zdravković" or the "House of the Brothers Zdravković". It was finished in 1940, immediately after Palace Albanija. It is not protected by itself, but it is a part of the Kosančićev Venac historical-spatial unit which is protected by the law.

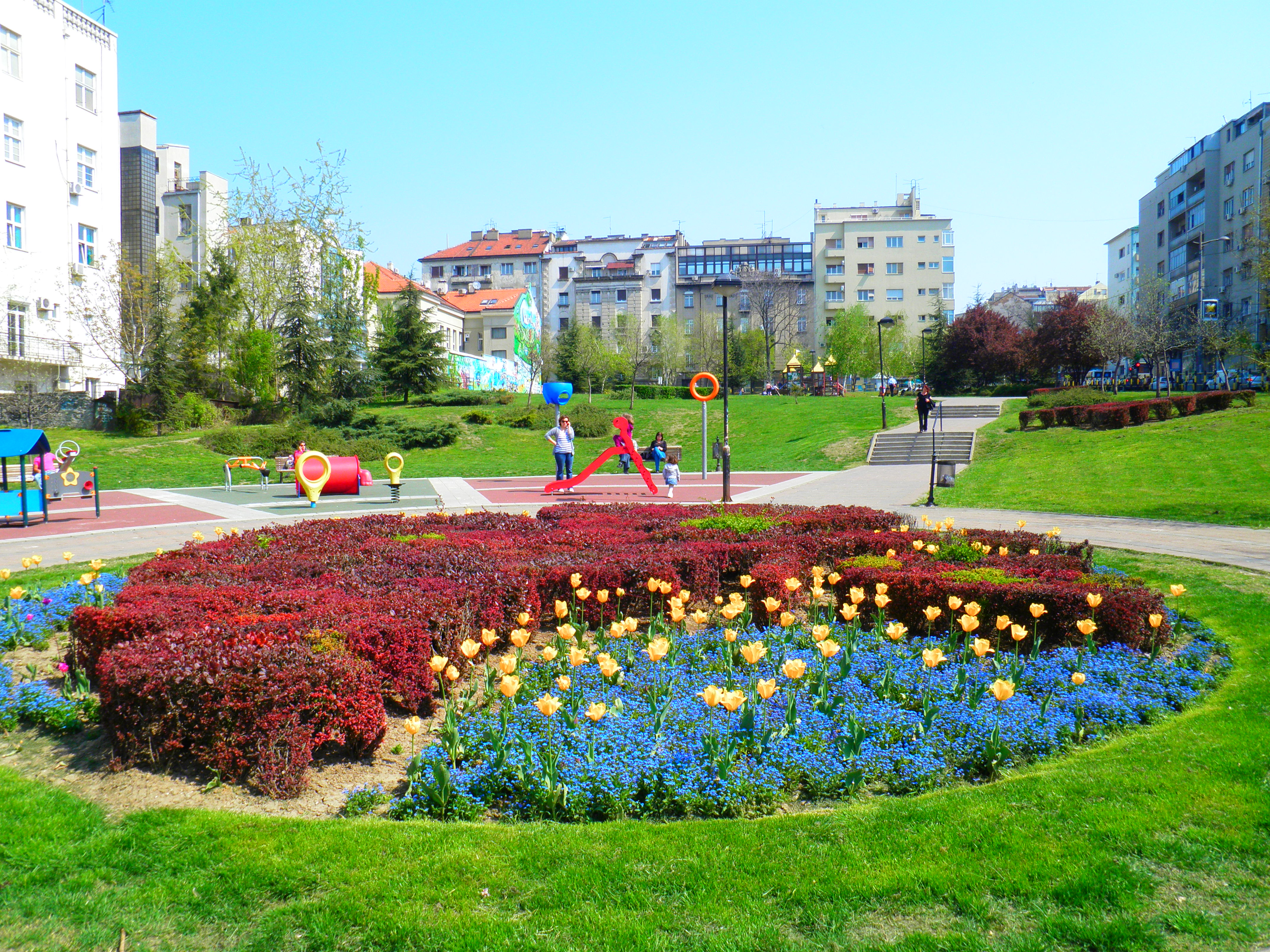
Mitić Hole in the Slavija Square, location of the planned, even higher Palace of the Merchant's Fund

=== Mitić Tower ===
Third twin was to be built on the Slavija Square. It was to be built on the land purchase in 1935 by the major merchant Vlada Mitić, one of the richest people in Belgrade at the time, and was announced as the "Mitić Warehouse" or the "Mitić Tower", the largest department store in the Balkans. Mitić announced his idea in 1940 and the works should have been finished in two years. With 14 floors and the height of 60 m (200 ft), the planned building was to be taller than the Palace Albanija itself.

Patterned after the German department stores, it was envisioned as the "vertical commercial city". Prljević and Lazarević, who already worked on Albanija, cooperated with the German architect Schäfer and followed the design of Albanija itself. The only difference was to be on top of the structure, where a specific tower with gallery-lookout was planned. The ambitious project included previously unseen innovations in Serbia, like the automatized parking platforms, escalators and the cutting edge fire protection system. The outbreak of World War II in Yugoslavia in 1941 halted the works, though the foundations for the building were laid.

The ill fortune of the location of the "third Albanija" since then spurred an urban myth in Belgrade, and the place became known as a jinxed and cursed property named Mitićeva rupa ("Mitić hole"). After the war, Communist government imprisoned Vlada Mitić and confiscated his entire property, including the lot on which the tower was planned and funds prepared for its construction. From 1946 to 1980, 26 different project were completed for the lot, but none was realized.

Then mayor of Belgrade, Bogdan Bogdanović decided to put a large sundial in the place in the first half of the 1980s. In the early 1990s, Dafiment banka, one of the major Ponzi schemes of the Milošević's regime, bought the lot and announced a monumental shopping mall, but after the scheme failed completely, the lot was fenced and turned into the dump. After the regime change in 2000, the area was cleaned and a temporary park with children playground was built instead. The failed projects continued, including the ultra-modern, gigantic shopping mall by the Israeli investors which turned out to be a complete hoax.
