= Park Republika Srpska =

Park in Belgrade, Serbia

- Парк Република Српска
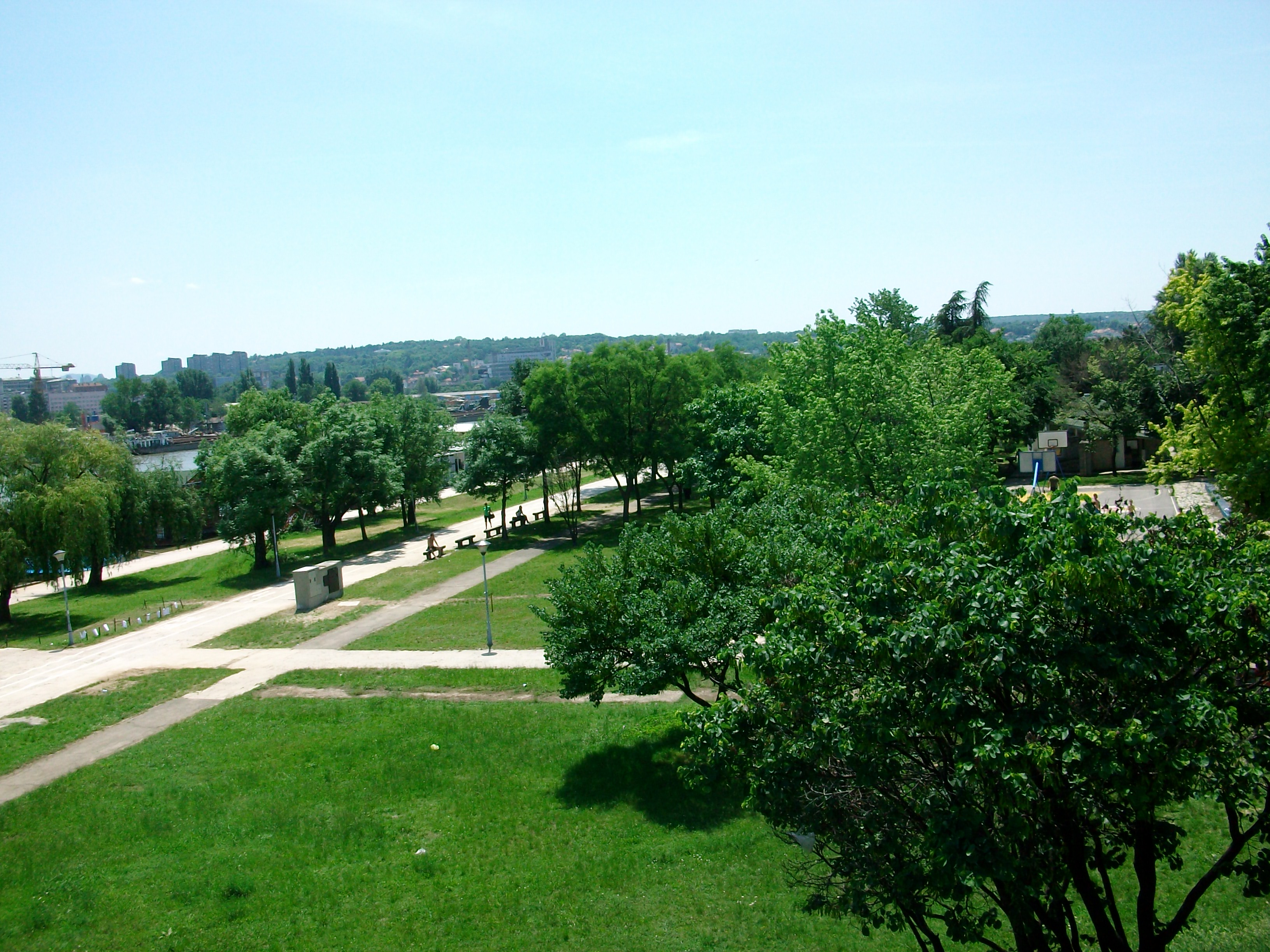

- Location within Belgrade
- Location: New Belgrade, Belgrade
- Coordinates: 44.808°N 20.443°E
- Open: All year

Park Republika Srpska (Serbian Cyrillic: Парк Република Српска) is a park in Belgrade, the capital of Serbia. It is located in the municipality of New Belgrade.

== Location ==
The park is located in the eastern part of the municipality, along the Sava River. It is bounded by Brodarska Street to the west, the Gazela Bridge to the south, and the former Old Sava Bridge to the north. Its eastern boundary follows the left bank of the Sava, along the riverside quay known in this section as the Quay of the Jasenovac Victims. The park extends westward into the residential area of the Staro Sajmište local community, southward into the Savski Nasip neighbourhood, and northward into the Staro Sajmište itself.

== History ==
The park area used to be known as the Park of the Non-aligned, after the Third World countries movement co-founded by then Yugoslav president Josip Broz Tito. The park was formed in 1978. The 3 hectares (7.4 acres) park's poor maintenance over decades caused it to fall into bad shape.

As a joint initiative of Boris Tadić (President of Serbia) and Milorad Dodik (Prime Minister of Republika Srpska), with assistance of the Belgrade city government and communal services, and plant breeders from Banja Luka, 1.7 hectares (4.2 acres) of the park were restored, and the new park opened on 30 April 2008.

On 13 March 2020, 269 additional trees were planted in the park. They were mostly maple and various conifers. The seedlings were planted by the mayor of Belgrade Zoran Radojičić and ambassador of Sweden to Belgrade, Jan Lundin. In 2020, 79 seedlings of Japanese cherry were donated by the Japanese Business Alliance. In order to commemorate the 2020 Summer Olympics in Tokyo, they were arranged in the form of the Olympic rings in April 2021.

By the 2020s, the park expanded to 7 hectares (17 acres). The promenade along the quay on the Sava's left bank is 1 kilometre (0.62 mi) long. There are two basketball courts and 2 kilometres (1.2 mi) long bicycle track. In November 2021 it was renamed to the Quay of the Jasenovac Victims.

Additional 60 trees were planted on 9 December 2022, commemorating the Human Rights Day, by numerous city officials, embassies representatives, and members of the human rights organizations, including Belgrade's deputy mayor Vesna Vidović and U.S. ambassador Christopher R. Hill.

== Characteristics ==
The creation of a new park was conducted by planting of 300 deciduous and conifer trees, 500 square metres (5,400 sq ft) of grass turfs, 3,000 pieces of seasonal flowers, and park equipment donated by the Tamaris company from Banja Luka. The park and its promenades are already labeled one of the best arranged and an "open botanical garden", because of the unusual variety of plants in it, where "biology students can learn just by sitting on the benches".

== Plants ==
Among the trees planted in the park are several of the rare species in Serbia, including the living fossil ginkgo biloba, North American sequoia, red beech (Fagus silvatica f. atropunicea), curly willow, yellow beech, etc. The trees are mostly planted toward the center of the park, leaving an open low plant space surrounding it. The avenue in the central alley is made of the seedlings of the Weeping Birch, while the access walking paths to the center are made as an avenue of Norway maple and ash trees.
