= King Alexander Bridge =

Bridge in Belgrade, Serbia

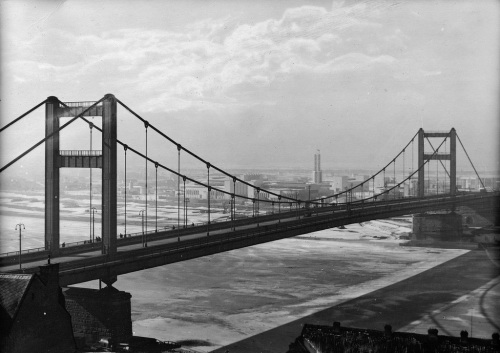
- King Alexander Bridge
- Coordinates: 44.8149°N 20.448°E
- Carries: 4 lanes (2 car, 2 tram)
- Crosses: Sava
- Locale: Belgrade, Serbia, Yugoslavia
- Official name: Мост краља Александра Карађорђевића; Most kralja Aleksandra Karađorđevića

Characteristics
- Design: Mirko Roš (head of the construction); Nikolay Krasnov (decoration)
- Total length: 474.7 m (1,557 ft)
- Height: 12 m (39 ft)
- Longest span: 261 m (856 ft)

History
- Construction start: July 1930
- Construction end: 11 December 1934
- Opened: 16 December 1934
- Closed: 12 April 1941 (partially demolished and out of service); 16 April 1944 (completely destroyed)

King Alexander Bridge (Serbian: Мост краља Александра, Most kralja Aleksandra), in full The Bridge of King Alexander Karađorđević or The Bridge of the Knightly King Alexander, was a road and tram bridge over the Sava river, in Belgrade, capital of Yugoslavia. It was the first permanent road bridge across the Sava in Belgrade after almost 250 years and the Long Bridge from 1688. Finished in 1934, it was damaged and out of use since 1941, and fully demolished in 1944, during World War II. Its pylons were later used for the modern Branko's Bridge, built in 1956. The bridge was revered while existed being described as "gorgeous" and "one of the most important object ever built in Belgrade".

== Location ==
On the right bank, the bridge was starting at the Sava Port, in the neighborhood of Savamala, a transportation and commercial hub and one of the busiest parts of Belgrade in that period. On the left bank, the bridge entered the still marshy and un-urbanized area where New Belgrade was built after 1948. The bridge continued into the road which connected Belgrade to Zemun, its outer suburb at the time. Belgrade's airport was located on the Zemun side, in Bežanija, built in 1927.

During history, however, there were at least 10 temporary, pontoon bridges on the location of the King Alexander Bridge. They were constructed solely for the purpose of conquering the city during the numerous battles and sieges of Belgrade in history, like in 1521, 1595, 1688 or 1717. The history recorded 5 Austrian and 5 Ottoman pontoon bridges.

== Construction ==
=== Development ===
Belgrade's first modern bridge was the Old Railroad Bridge, built in 1884. Before Yugoslavia was formed in 1918, the Sava was a border between Serbia and Austria-Hungary. After Yugoslavia was formed, the government and the city began considering the construction of the road bridge. The concessionaires were invited for the first time in 1921. It took nine years for the new state to amass the funds needed for the project: 190 million dinars by the state for the bridge and 30 million dinars by the city for the access roads.

In 1930, an international architectural design competition was set for the road bridge. The winner was a German company Gutehoffnungshütte (GHH) from Oberhausen. As the eastern section of the bridge was planned to start in the Sava port area, in the municipality of Savamala, the propositions included the minimal height of 12 m (39 ft) and a single span across the river of at least 250 m (820 ft) so that it wouldn't present an obstacle for the ships passing to the port and turning around under the bridge.

=== Building ===
Construction began in July 1930 and was built by a joint venture of the German Gutehoffnungshütte (GHH), executing the steel works, and the French company Société de Construction des Batignolles, performing all other works. The total length of the bridge was 474.7 m (1,557 ft). The main construction of the bridge spawned over 411 m (1,348 ft) across the river, with the main span being 261 m (856 ft) long.

The bridge was modeled after the Mülheim Bridge over the Rhine, in Cologne, Germany. The third "twin", based on almost the same project was built in Vienna, Austria, crossing the Danube. The second incarnation of the Reichsbrücke collapsed due to the structural failure on 1 August 1976.

The deadline for the completion was 8 June 1933, but this deadline was prolonged several times for various reasons. The 1931 Hoover Moratorium by the US president Herbert Hoover, suspended the reparation payments, so the procurement of iron construction was delayed. There were major issues with the expropriation of the lots on the Belgrade side, where the access roads were to be built. The area was already fully urbanized and populated with buildings, but the problem was continuously postponed. Underground waters flooded the area in front of the State Printing House building. The problem existed before, but the works on draining the water and construction of the protective wall were conducted only after the construction of the bridge already began, even physically blocking the access to the bridge's construction site.

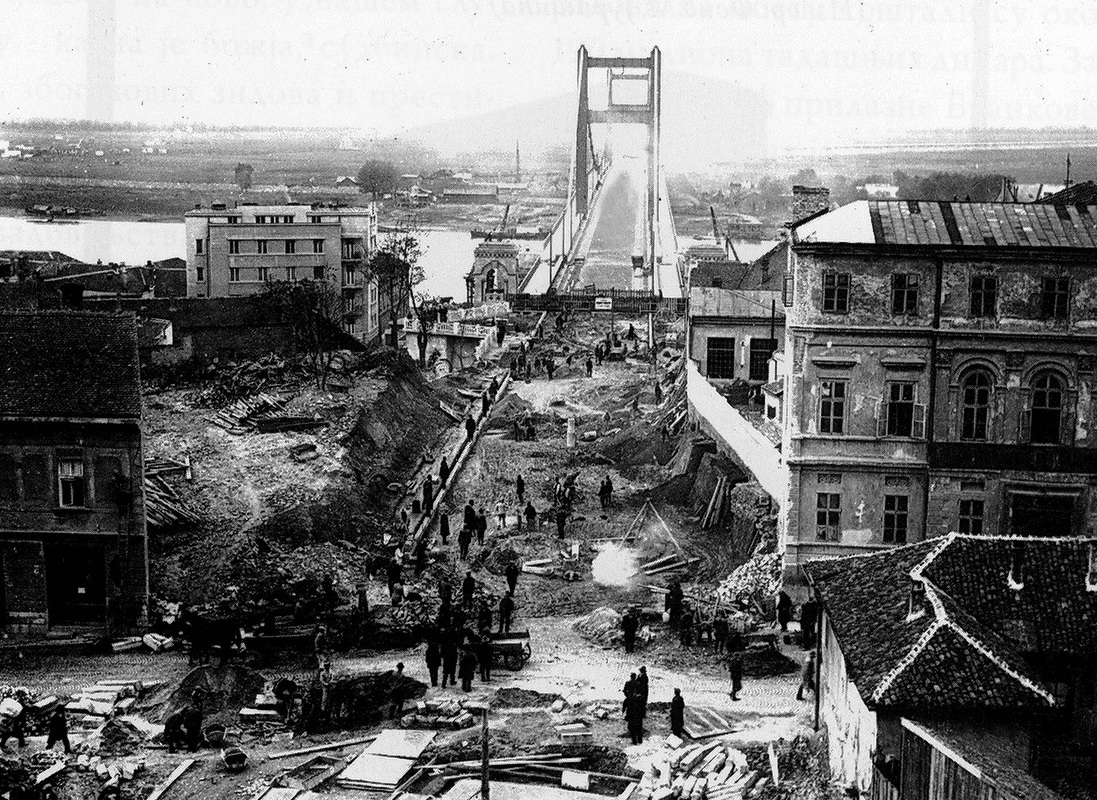
Construction of the bridge

The joining of the last parts of the iron construction was finished in November 1933, but it took another year to finish the access roads. A sandy beach with the cabins, kafanas and barracks, used as sheds by the fishermen, occupied the area where the access ramp was to be built on the left, Zemun's side. It was one of the favorite vacation spots of Belgraders, occupying the left bank of the Sava, north of the future bridge, in the modern Ušće neighborhood. People were transported from the city by small boats and the starting point was a small kafana "Malo pristanište" in Savamala. The objects were demolished manually, including numerous kafanas: "Ostend", "Zdravlje", "Abadžija", "Jadran", "Krf", "Dubrovnik", "Adrija", etc. The only one that wasn't demolished was "Nica", predecessor of the modern Ušće restaurant. In total, 20 proper objects and 2,000 cabins, barracks, sheds, etc. were demolished, jointly by the municipalities of Zemun and Bežanija, which owned half of the land each, and the proprietors of the objects. The plan was to build an embankment instead. However, the beach itself survived the construction of the bridge in 1934 as it only made access easier. The beach was finally closed in 1938 when the construction of the embankment began. The beach itself was called Nica (Serbian for Nice, in France) after one of the kafanas.

The supporting pylon on the right bank was built on the ruins of the former mosque, Liman Mosque. The remnants had to be removed first and this was the source of the popular myth after the demolition, that the bridge was cursed.

Head of the project was Swiss-educated engineer Mirko Roš.

=== Opening ===
On 11 and 12 December 1934 the bridge was tested by dozens of city's tank trucks. It was ceremonially open on 16 December with 700 horsemen crossing over it. The unit was combined from the horsemen of the Royal Guards Artillery, Cavalry of the Junior Officers School and Zemun's Students Squad. To prove the high quality of the bridge, they trotted across the bridge four times.

The bridge was officially opened on 16 December 1934. King Alexander, after whom the bridge was named, was assassinated on 9 October 1934 in Marseille, France, so the bridge was open by the Prince Regent Paul. By the 1931 census Belgrade had a population of 266,849 while the west bank was not urbanized yet and still some 150,000 citizens crossed the bridge on the opening day. Roš was convincing the people that it is "normal" for the bridge to swing 13 cm (5.1 in) and that it was perfectly safe. The press noted that bridge was swinging like a toy on springs under only 350 tons during the cavalry testing, even though it was designed to carry 25,000 tons, but also reassured public that this is normal and that bridge is the work of art of modern technology.

Two days after the opening, the official barge-ferry line Belgrade-Zemun was discontinued.

== History ==
=== Future developments ===
On 5 November 1935, the first tram line over the bridge was established. Three especially decorated tram compositions fared from the starting point at the Hotel Moskva to Zemun. The tram line was labeled No. 14 and connected Belgrade and Zemun via the route Hotel Moskva/Terazije-Hotel Central/Zemun, so the people colloquially called the bridge Zemunski most ("Zemun Bridge",) Viseći most ("Hanging Bridge") or Lančani most ("Chain Bridge").

In the early 1934, the idea of placing statues on two pylons emerged. Sculptor Ivan Meštrović proposed four horsemen, two on each pylon on two sides of the bridge. The horsemen were to represent Serbian Emperor Dušan, Croatian King Tomislav, Bosnian King Tvrtko and Serbian King Peter I. Dušan and Peter were to be placed on the east pylons, and Tomislav and Tvrko on the west. The columns on which the horsemen were to be place, were imagined as being 22 m (72 ft) high, and with the pylons' height of 23 m (75 ft), the statues were supposed to be placed on the 45 m (148 ft) high pedestal. However, many architects, engineers and sculptors protested due to the several reasons: non-compliance during the procedure of selecting the sculptor, high price of venture while the figures were labeled as being dysfunctional. Especially vocal was architect Dragiša Brašovan. Meštrović was also accused of megalomania and for marring of the bridge. As a result of this opposition, the project was scrapped.

The bridge became favorite place for Belgrade's high school graduates. They were gathering on the bridge on the graduation day, and threw their hats and books into the Sava.

=== World War II ===
German invasion of Yugoslavia began on 6 April 1941 with the heavy aerial bombing, especially of Belgrade (Operation "Retribution"). In a vain attempt to halt the advancing German army, Royal Yugoslav Army decided to demolish all three bridges which existed in Belgrade at that time (other two were Old Railroad Bridge and Bridge of the King Peter II). Military commander of Belgrade, general Vojislav Nikolajević, was ordered to demolish them, and the order for the King Alexander Bridge was executed by major Velimir Piletić. The bridge was wired with the explosives on 11 April 1941. It was blown up during the night and went out of service but apart from failing to stop the occupying army, the demolition directly caused a lethal accident. As the Royal Army was in a disarray, they blew up the bridge while the tugboat Tanasko Rajić was towing the military transport ship Korana with Yugoslav soldiers, transporting them to the reserve position in the village of Ostružnica, downstream the Sava. Not seeing the ships in the pitch dark, the military engineers blew up the bridge and the construction fell directly on the ships, killing 95 out of 110 soldiers and crew members.

Though unusable since April 1941, the remains of the bridge persisted until the heavy "Easter bombing" of Belgrade by the Allies on 16 April 1944 when it was demolished completely.

== Architecture ==
The construction of the bridge was patterned in the Serbo-Byzantine style, placed on two pylons made of reinforced concrete, while it was held by the steel cables.

A special notion was given to the decoration of the bridge. The process of ornamentation was handed to architect Nikolay Krasnov, known for other monumental city buildings. A focus of embellishment wasn't on the body of the bridge but on the secondary objects: supporting pylons, access ramps, substructure and the tall pillar on the eastern access, between the Karađorđeva Street and the bank. Krasnov envisioned the decoration of the façade in the sandstone. Major influence was to be the Romanesque architecture with details from the Byzantine architecture which Krasnov deemed appropriate for the, otherwise, massive pylons on which the bridge was constructed. One of the sources for the decorative elements was heraldry. Krasnov scrapped the original idea of carving the personal, dynastic heraldic symbols and ornamented the façades with the state symbols, including total of 8 Yugoslav coats of arms.

In 1935 Krasnov made additional plans for the decorations, in the aftermath of the King Alexander's assassination. The new project was focused on the pylons' girders, where the body of the bridge leaned on. Steel girders were to be coated with gold plated bronze with the royal crowns above them. On the horizontal crossbars the king's last words (now generally considered as being false) should be written: "Guard Yugoslavia". Between the words, a state coat of arms in bronze, 3.5 m (11 ft) tall, was to be placed. The project remained on paper as was deemed too expensive at the time.

== Importance ==
The bridge was revered after it was finished. It has been described as "gorgeous", "one of the most important object ever built in Belgrade" and "hanging colossus". Labeled as the "major building project during the Interbellum", it was praised for having both the important infrastructural and symbolic value as it was the first road bridge spawning the Sava, ending its purpose as the border river and marking the directions in which the city will develop.

Belgrade and Zemun developed completely independently for centuries and for the most part during the history two towns belonged to two different states. Zemun became part of the same administrative unit as Belgrade on 4 October 1929. After the bridge was completed and the permanent road link established, Zemun lost its separate town status to Belgrade in 1934.

Also in 1934 city plans were expanded to include the creation of a new urban tissue which would connected Belgrade and Zemun. In the 1930s members of Belgrade's affluent elite began to buy land from the villagers of Bežanija, which at that time administratively spread all the way to the King Alexander Bridge, which was a dividing point between Bežanija and Zemun. From 1933 a settlement, consisting mostly of individual villas, began to develop. Also, a group of Belarus emigrants built several small buildings, mostly rented by the carters who carried goods across the river. As the settlement, which became known as New Belgrade, was built without building permits, authorities threatened to demolish it, but in 1940 government officially "legalized the informal settlement of New Belgrade". Prior to that, the city already semi-officially recognized the new settlement, as it helped with building its streets and pathways. By 1939 it already had several thousands inhabitants, a representative in the city hall, and was unofficially called New Belgrade.

In 1937, for the purpose of hosting Belgrade Fair, a complex of buildings was erected next to the already existing community and just south of the Zemun's section of the bridge. The foundation stone was ceremonially set by the king Alexander I of Yugoslavia on 6 June 1937. It was built in three months and the facility was open on 11 September 1937. It was the site of the new Belgrade fair (hence the name) with modern and artistic buildings and constructions, including high metal spike construction, which became known as the Central Tower. Designed by the architects Milivoje Tričković, Rajko Tatić and Đorđe Lukić, it was envisioned as the monumental modern complex, with the Central Tower as the domineering motif. Around it, pavilions for the exhibitions were built: five Yugoslav, one for the “Nikola Spasić Foundation” and national pavilions of Italy, Czechoslovakia, Romania, Hungary and the Dutch company Philips. The complex included: 17,000 m^{2} (180,000 sq ft) of roofed exhibition space, 20,000 m^{2} (220,000 sq ft) of open exhibition space, 25,000 m^{2} (270,000 sq ft) of lawns and flower beds and 22,000 m^{2} (240,000 sq ft) of roads and paths. Turned into the Sajmište concentration camp during World War II, today it is known as the neighborhood of Staro Sajmište.

== After demolition ==
As it was the only road bridge across the Sava, the Germans needed a bridge for transportation of the troops, wounded, military equipment and raw materials from central into the south Europe. Originally, they constructed the pontoon bridge on the boats, right next to the south of the demolished bridge, where the pavilions of Belgrade Fair were. Germans used some 600 m (2,000 ft) of mobile bridge construction which they confiscated from Yugoslav army at Šabac. Hastily built on 24 April 1941, several days later it collapsed with several German vehicles falling into the river. A bit further, another same-type pontoon bridge was built. The pontoon bridges had the "noon break", when they were disconnected to let the ships pass. Germans decided that the reparation of the bridge would be a major operation, so in 1942 they relocated the bridge they just built over the Tisa river near Žabalj. As of November 2019, that bridge still stands and is in use, being named Old Sava Bridge.

After the war, as the bridge was demolished and several trams remained on the Zemun side, the tram line on the west bank was re-established, connecting Zemun and Staro Sajmište (line No. 14).

The new bridge on the same location, today known as the Branko's Bridge, was built in 1956. It actually uses lower parts of the former bridge's pylons as outer constraints for its two secondary spans. The body of the bridge was provided by the German company MAN SE, which co-constructed its predecessor, King Alexander Bridge in 1934.

The decorative elements of Nikolay Krasnov on the pylons survived both bombings, but were removed in the 1960s by the new authorities. In June 2020 it was announced that the decorative coats of arms will be recreated on the pylons. Starting in the 2010s, some civil organizations continuously promoted the idea of restoring the original appearance of the bridge and for returning the bridge's original name.

Symbolically, the Bridge of King Alexander still exists today, in the form of Sava Bridge in Kraljevo, in central Serbia, 200 km (120 mi) away from its original location. Using parts of the demolished bridge, engineers formed a smaller, but functional bridge, which was transported to Kraljevo and placed over the Ibar river.

== Gallery ==
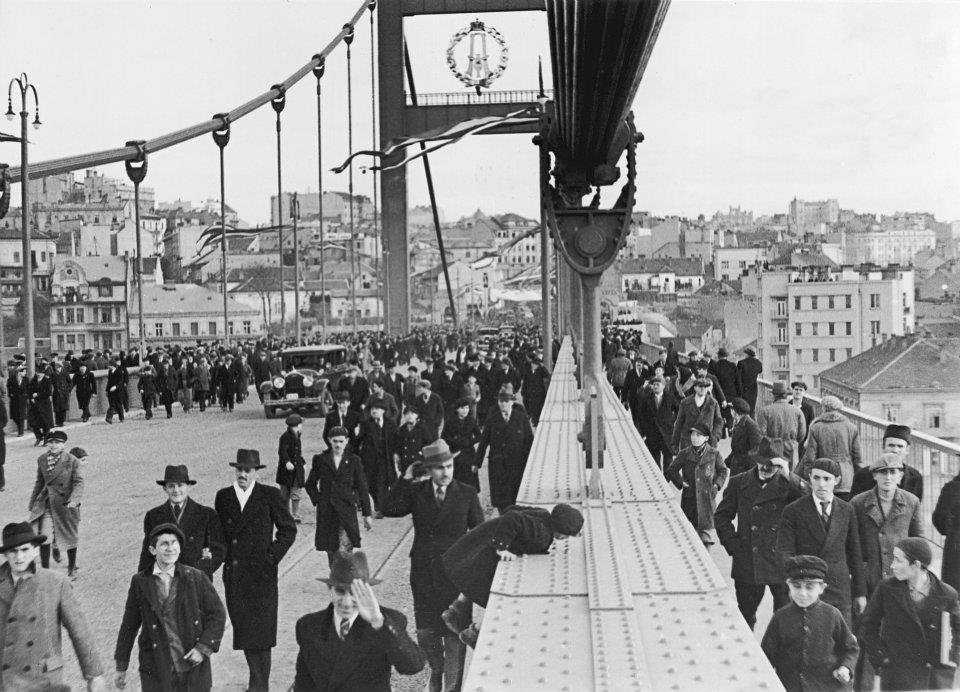
Opening of the bridge 1

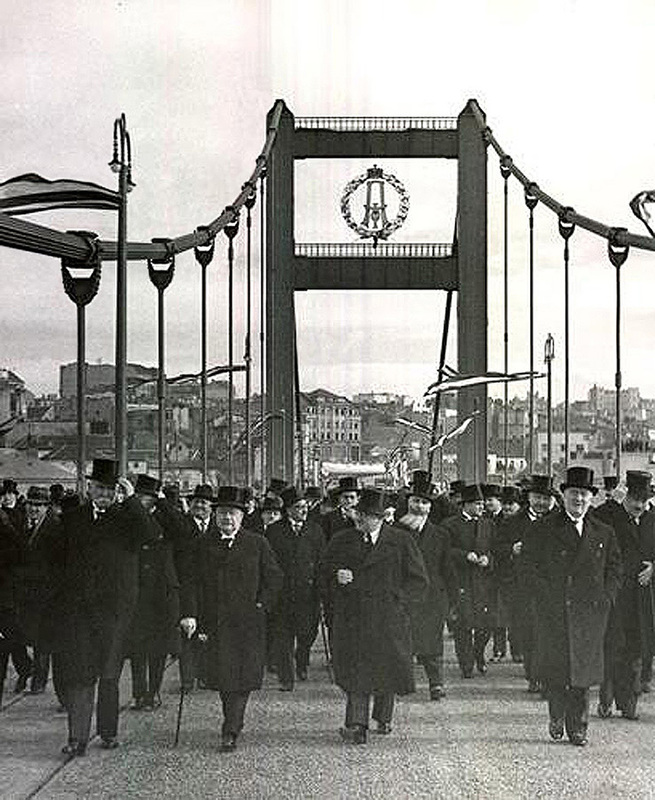
Opening of the bridge 2

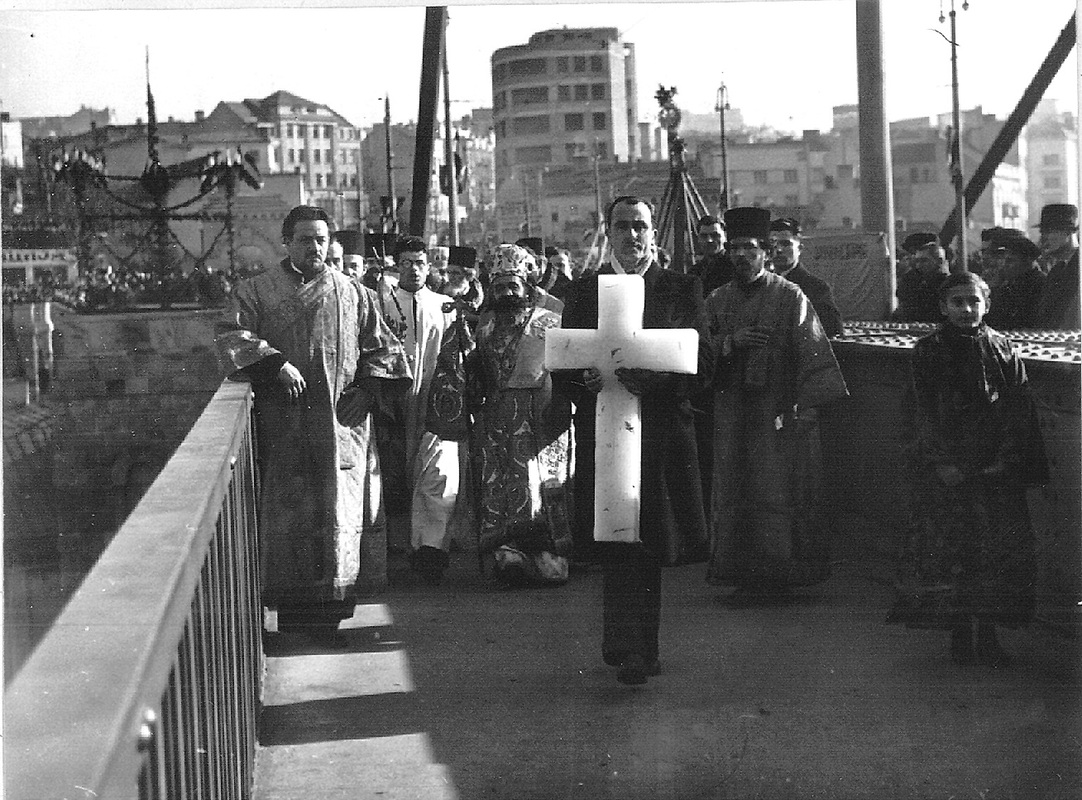
Consecration

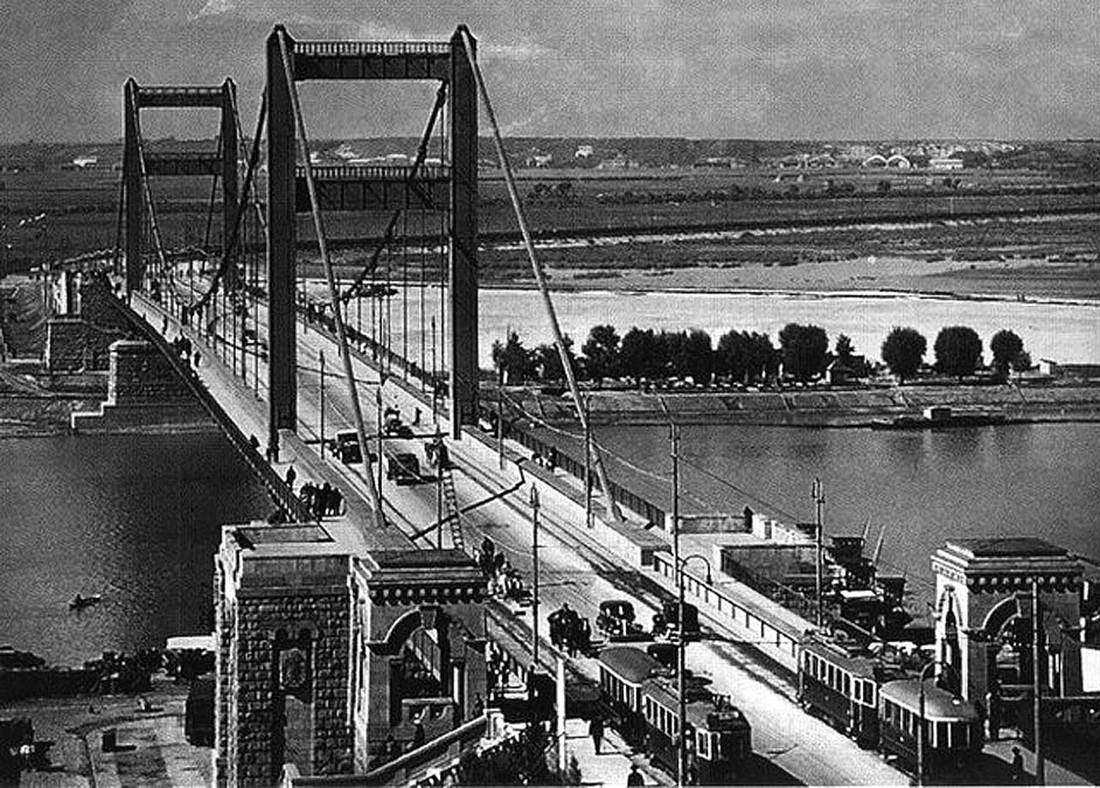
View on the bridge

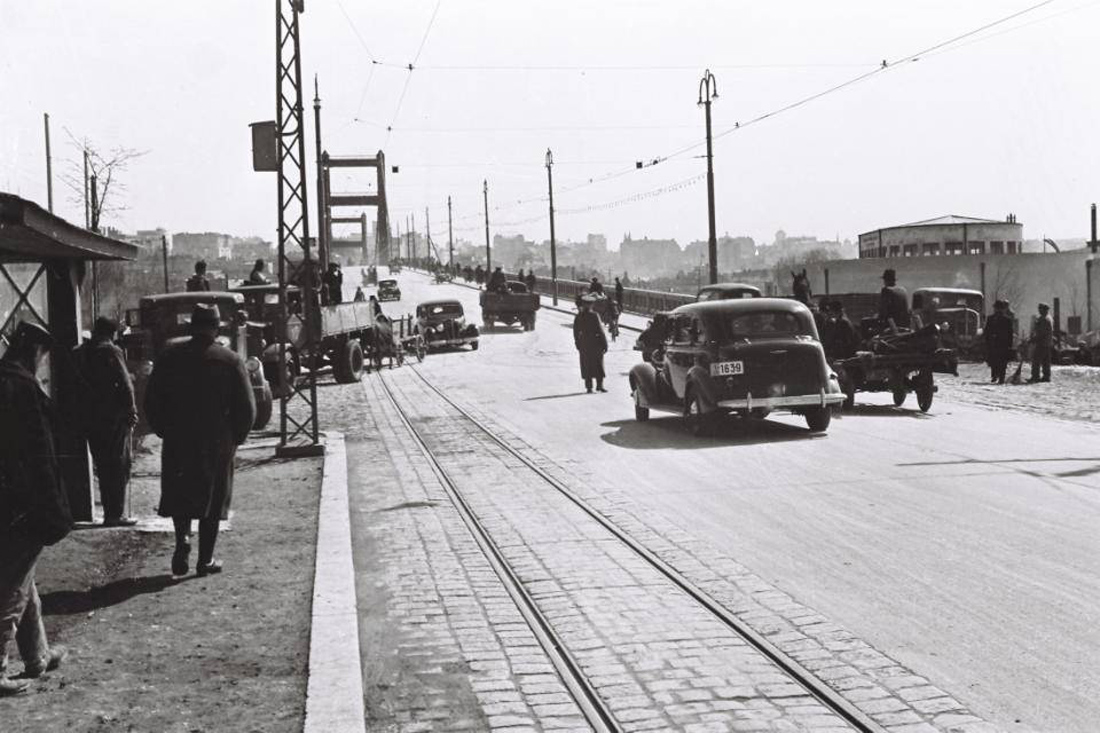
Tram lane

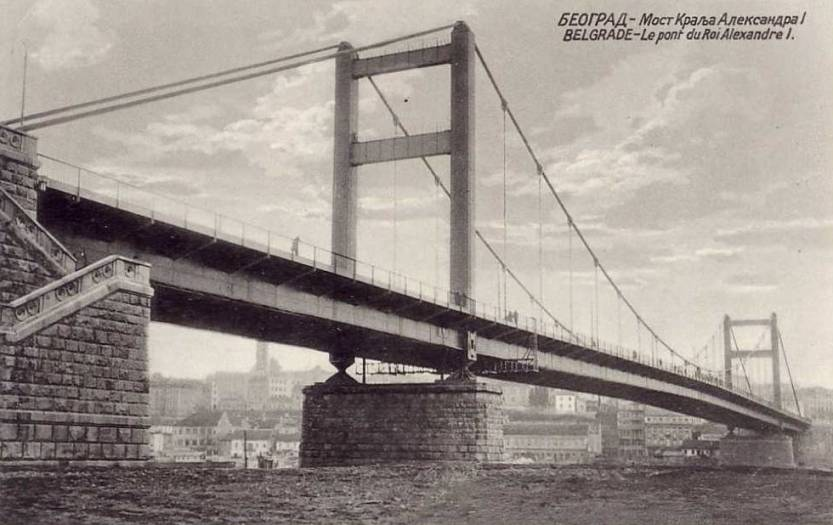
Panoramic view

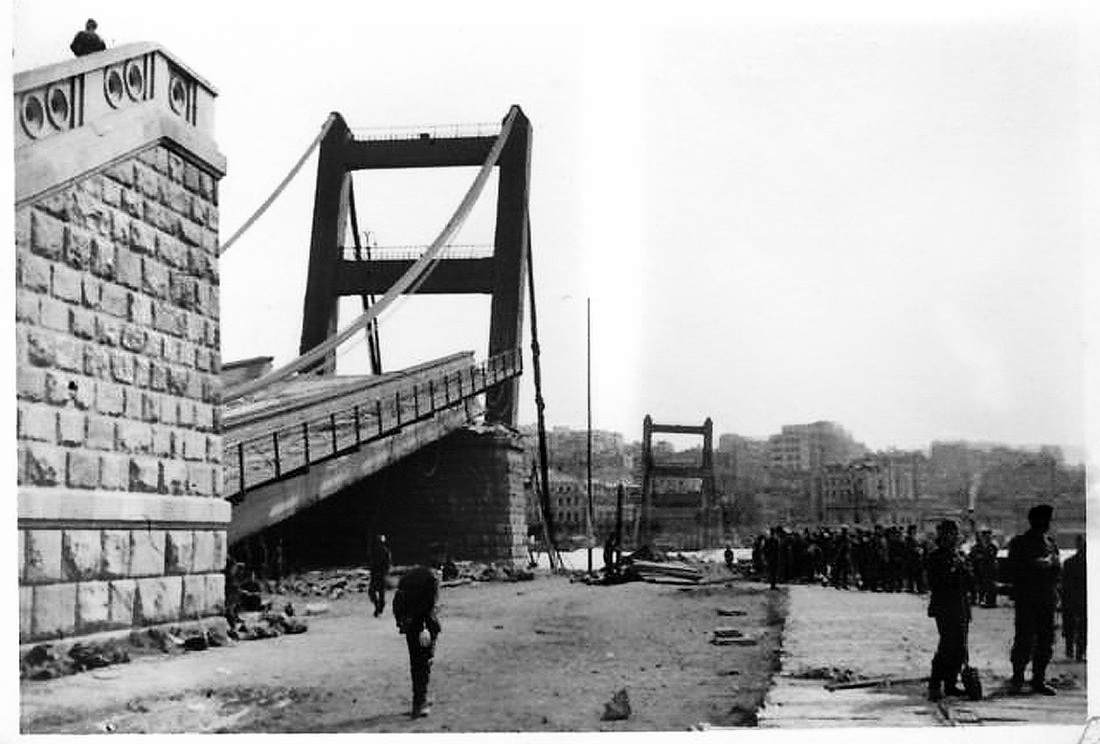
Demolition 1

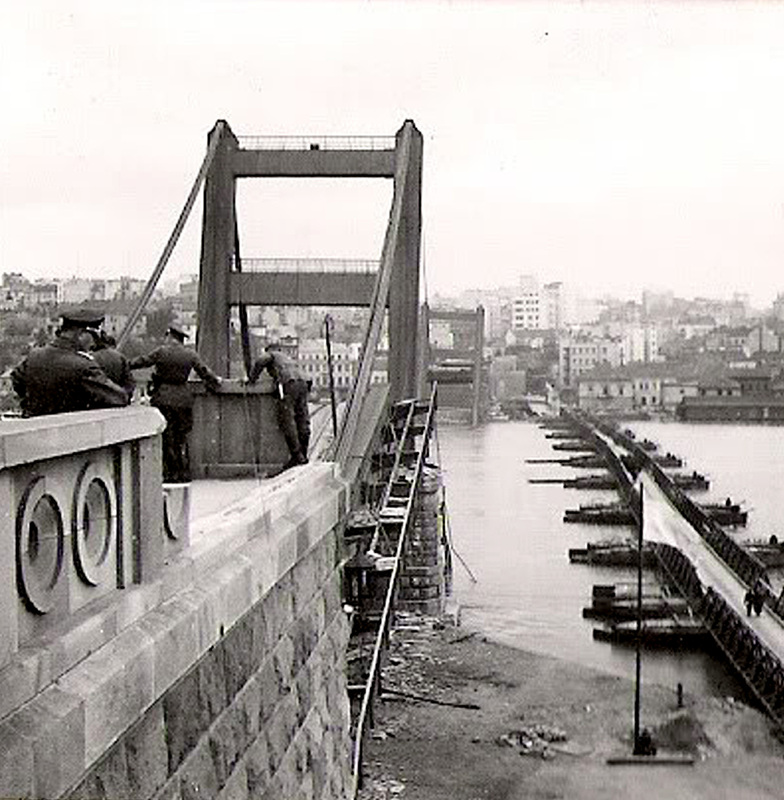
Demolition 2

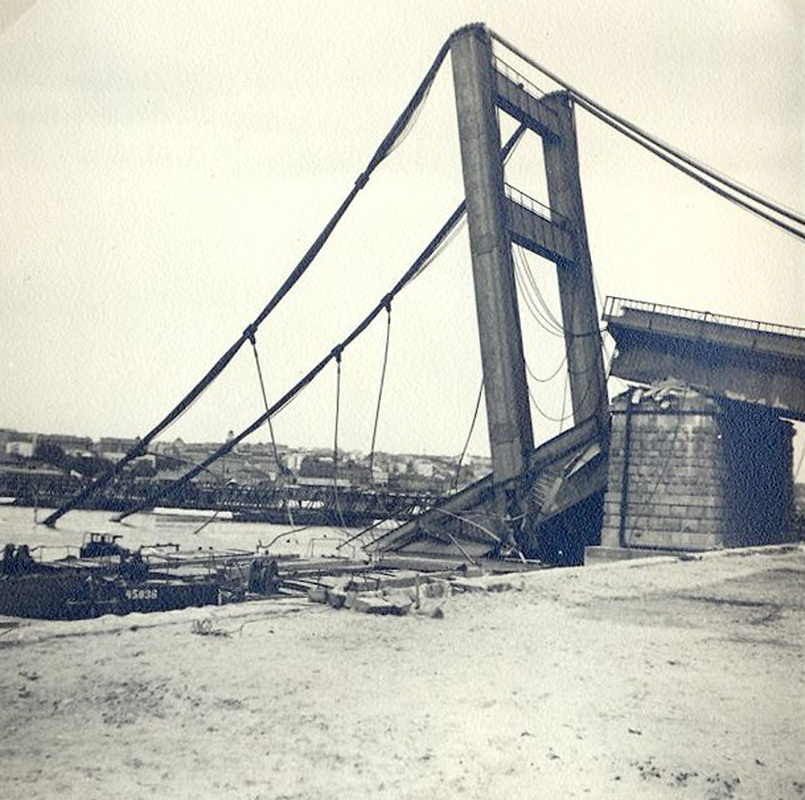
Demolition 3

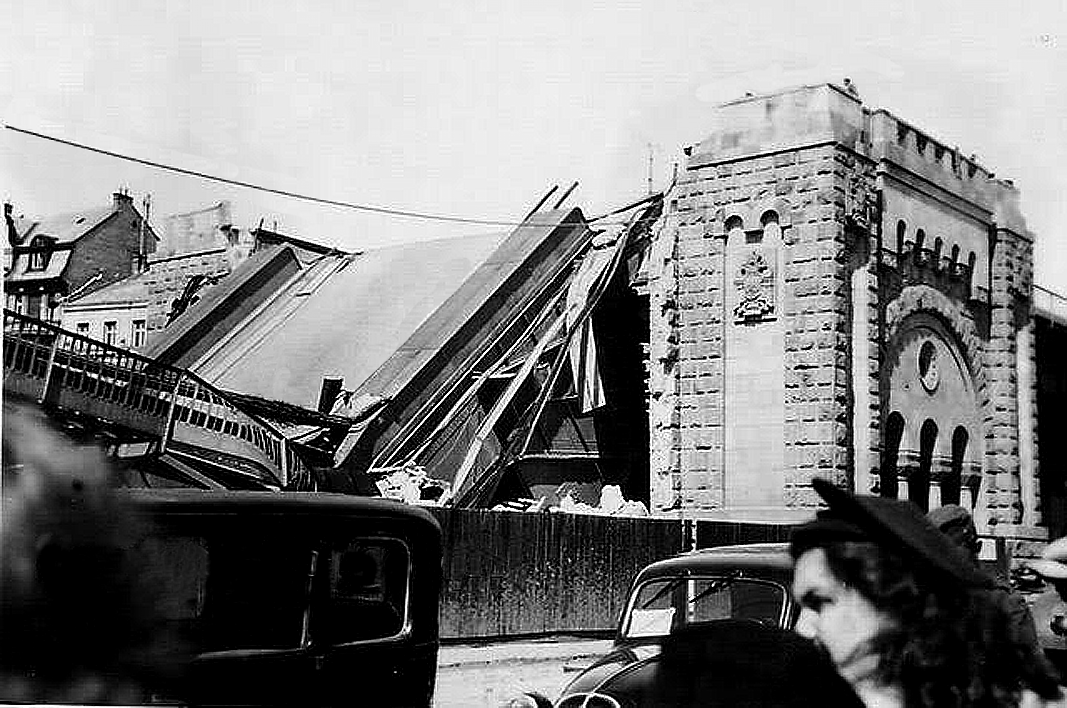
Demolition 4

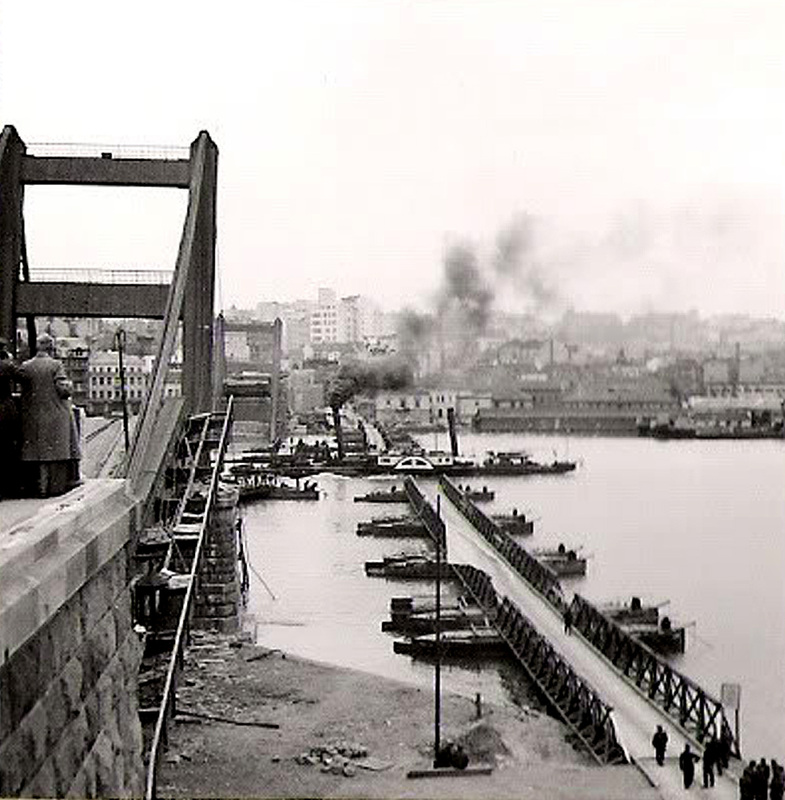
Demolition 5

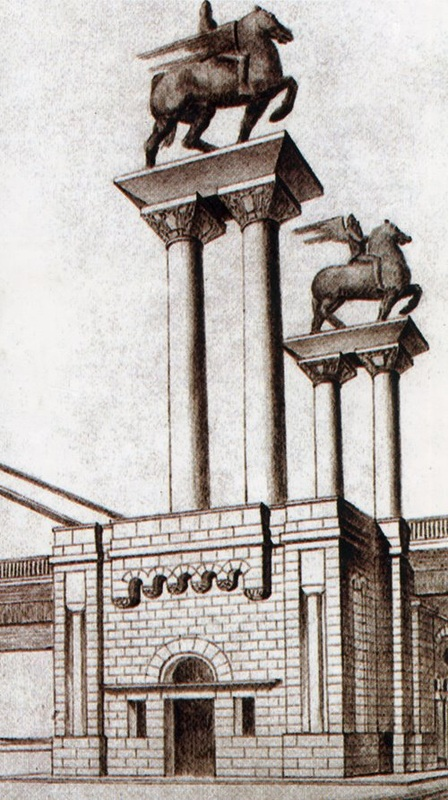
Proposed statues

== See also ==
- Branko's Bridge
- Old Sava Bridge
