= Staro Sajmište =

Staro Sajmište Старо Сајмиште
- Urban neighbourhood
- Etymology: Old Fairground
- Location within Belgrade
- Coordinates: 44°48′46″N 20°26′37″E
- Country: Serbia
- Region: Belgrade
- Municipality: New Belgrade
- Local community: Staro Sajmište
- Established: 1937

Population (2011)
  - Total: 1,862
- Time zone: UTC+1 (CET)
  - Summer (DST): UTC+2 (CEST)
- Area code: +381(0)11
- Car plates: BG

Staro Sajmište (Serbian Cyrillic: Старо Сајмиште, romanized: Old Fairground) is an urban neighborhood of Belgrade, the capital of Serbia. It is located in the municipality of New Belgrade and was the site of the World War II Sajmište concentration camp from 1941 to 1944, when the area was under control of the Nazi puppet state Independent State of Croatia.

== Location ==
Staro Sajmište is located in the Novi Beograd's Block 17, between the street of Zemunski put (extension of the Old Sava Bridge), the Mihajlo Pupin boulevard (extension of the Branko's bridge) and the Sava river. It extends into the non-residential neighborhood of Ušće on the north and into the newly developed Savograd on the west. Sajmište street curves within the settlement. In the south it extended into the former informal settlement Cardboard city, and further into industrialized neighborhood of Savski Nasip.

Although this is what is usually considered as the Staro Sajmište, local community (sub-municipal administrative unit) of the same name also includes the entire Block 18 to the south, which is located between the streets of Vladimira Popovića and Zemunski put, Gazela Bridge and the left bank of the Sava.

== History ==
=== Before 1941 ===
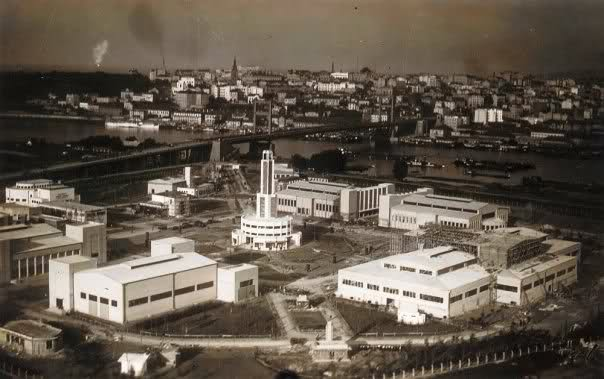
Belgrade Fairground in 1937

In the period between the World Wars, settlements began to form on the left bank of the Sava river, closer to Belgrade, as the only existing settlement on the marshy territory of today's Novi Beograd at that time was the village of Bežanija, quite far away from Belgrade. Construction of the King Alexander Bridge lasted from 1930 to 1934, and the filling and embankment of the Sava bank began in 1936.

During the 1930s, members of Belgrade's affluent elite began to buy land from the villagers of Bežanija, which at that time, administratively spread all the way to the King Alexander Bridge, which was a dividing point between Bežanija and Zemun. From 1933 a settlement, consisting mostly of individual villas, began to develop. Also, a group of White Russian emigrants built several small buildings, mostly rented by the carters who carried goods across the river. As the settlement, which became known as New Belgrade, was built without building permits, authorities threatened to demolish it, but in 1940 government officially "legalized the informal settlement of New Belgrade". Prior to that, the city already semi-officially recognized the new settlement, as it helped with building its streets and pathways. By 1939 it already had several thousands inhabitants, a representative in the city hall, and was unofficially called New Belgrade.

It was decided to build the fairgrounds complex adjoining to the already existing settlement. The foundation stone was ceremonially placed on 6 June 1937. It was built in three months and the facility was open on 11 September 1937. It was the site of the new Belgrade fair (hence the name) with modern and artistic buildings and constructions, including high metal spike construction, which became known as the Central Tower. Designed by the architects Milivoje Tričković, Rajko Tatić and Đorđe Lukić, it was envisioned as the monumental modern complex, with the Central Tower as the domineering motif. Around it, pavilions for the exhibitions were built: five Yugoslav, one for the “Nikola Spasić Foundation” and national pavilions of Italy, Czechoslovakia, Romania, Hungary and the Dutch company Philips. The complex included: 17,000 m^{2} (180,000 sq ft) of roofed exhibition space, 20,000 m^{2} (220,000 sq ft) of open exhibition space, 25,000 m^{2} (270,000 sq ft) of lawns and flower beds and 22,000 m^{2} (240,000 sq ft) of roads and paths.

It hosted international fairs, with task of promoting the economy of the Kingdom of Yugoslavia as well. On the first exhibition from September 1937, there were 883 exhibitors, 493 Yugoslav and 390 foreign (17 countries from Europe, America and Asia). It had 310,000 visitors, while at the 1931 census Belgrade had a population of 266,849. In September 1938 one of the exhibitions on the fair was the first presentation of television in this part of Europe (it will be 18 years before first television station in communist Yugoslavia will appear), by Philips. The first motor show, 1938 Belgrade Car Show, was held in March 1938.

After Yugoslav government signed a deal with the Czechoslovak Škoda Works for the purchase of 300 tanks in 1937, as a gesture of thanks, the company decided to donate the towering construction as the parachuting attraction. The "parachutists tower" was opened on 2 June 1938, dedicated with lavish ceremony. The latticed steel construction was 74 metres (243 ft) tall, becoming the tallest structure in Belgrade. The tower was an imposing and domineering structure, which, due to its height and position in the flat and low terrain, was visible from all parts of Belgrade from across the river. It was claimed that the Škoda Tower was the tallest facility of its kind in both Europe and the world. It was used both for the professional training of the parachutists, but also for the amateur jumps by the fair visitors.

Construction of Staro Sajmište was an important, almost pivotal occurrence in the urban development of Belgrade at the time but not only due to its economic importance. The complex was the only fully encircled spatial unit, excelling and singling out itself compared to other social centers in the city. It also included the first planned greening of the modern New Belgrade area. The project for the greenery arrangement in the complex was done by engineer Aleksandar Krstić.

=== War years ===
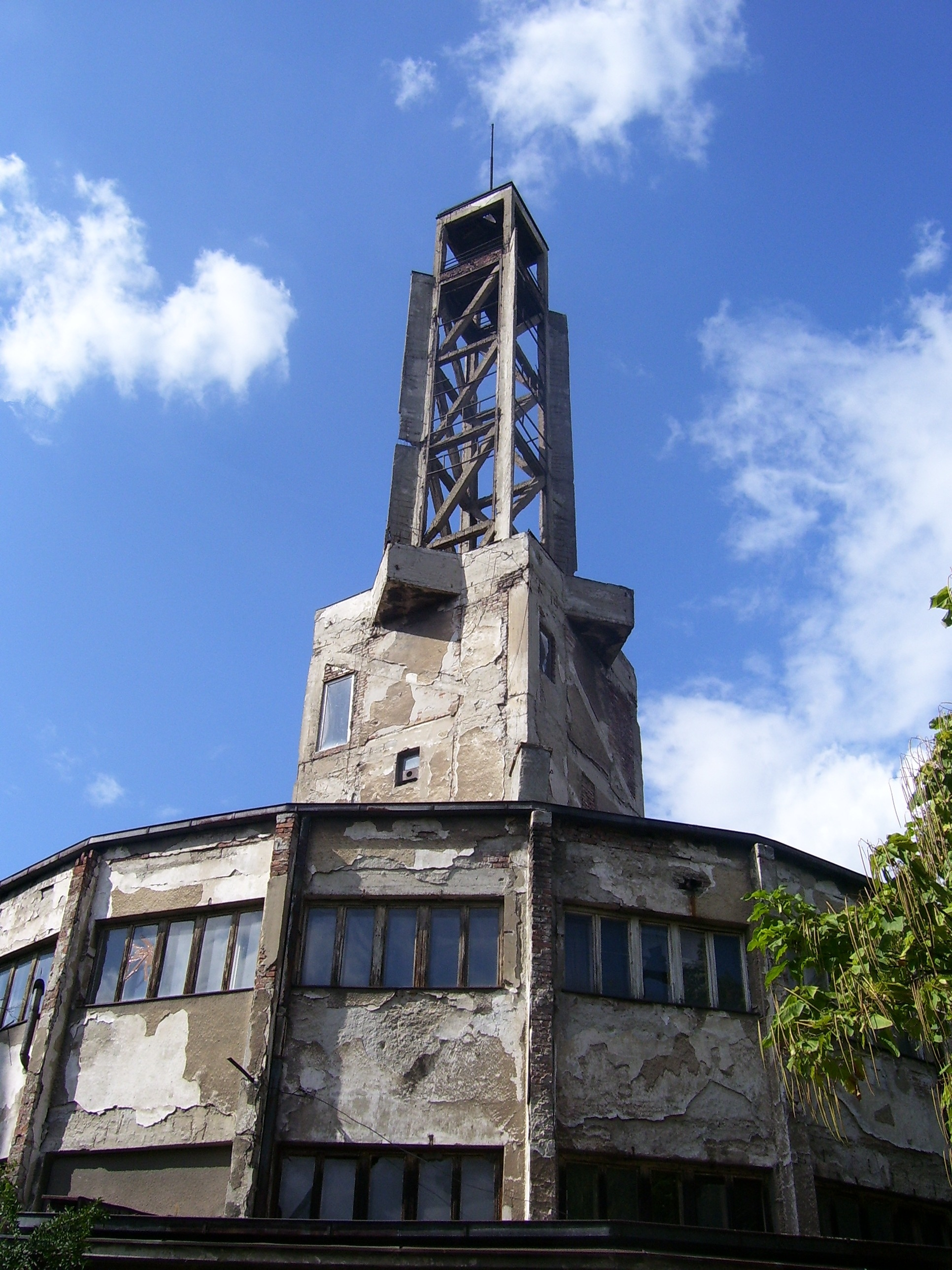
Staro Sajmište Central tower, part of the Sajmište concentration camp

After the April war of 1941 when Germany and its allies occupied and partitioned the Kingdom of Yugoslavia, entire Syrmia region (including the left bank of the Sava) became part of the Independent State of Croatia. Nazi secret police, Gestapo, took over Sajmište. They encircled it with several rings of barbed wire turning it into what they referred to as "collection center" – a euphemism for a prison. It eventually became a concentration camp. Until May 1942 Germans used Sajmište concentration camp to mostly kill off Jews from Belgrade and other parts of Serbia. From April 1942 onwards, Serbian prisoners were transported in from Jasenovac and Stara Gradiška concentration camps run by Croatian Ustaše collaborators. Partisans captured throughout Serbia were also sent to Sajmište. Detainees were also sent in from other parts of Yugoslavia, especially Serbs after major German offensives on briefly liberated territories. Executions of captured prisoners lasted as long as the camp existed. During their heavy “Easter bombing” of Belgrade on 17 April 1944, United States Army Air Force heavy bombers based in Italy targeted the nearby bridges over the Sava river as well as Main Belgrade Railway Station and its workshops, but bombed from high altitude to reduce losses to German antiaircraft fire, but consequently many bombs missed by hundreds of meters and some hit Sajmište thus killing around 100 inmates and inflicting heavy damage on the camp itself, destroying all the buildings except for the Spasić pavilion and the Central tower.

Among others, prisoners included Serbian women, children and the elderly from Kozara region, entire Jewish families from Belgrade and other cities, Romani families, as well as entire Serbian populations of different Syrmian villages. Initial Yugoslav estimates conducted in 1948 put the death toll at 50,000 out of 100,000 total inmates. According to the Helsinki Committee for Human Rights in Serbia, the death toll had been exaggerated by the Communist Party for political purposes and the true number of total inmates was 50,000, of whom 20,000 were murdered. It is estimated that half of all Serbian Jews perished in the camp. The Staro Sajmište memorial cites 23,000 fatalities, of which 10,000 were Jewish.

=== After 1945 ===
After the war the settlement was totally neglected for years and gradually started falling apart. Former fair buildings were awarded to some prominent artists (painters and sculptors) as their ateliers. The Škoda Tower managed to survive all the bombings during the war, so as fighting during the Belgrade offensive in October 1944. New Communist authorities decided to demolish it, though the exact reason why was not known. It is suspected that this was due to the highly negative perception among the citizens because of the role the tower had during the war years when it was equipped with searchlights and several machine gun nests to monitor the area and the river, and to stop those trying to escape the lager, earning the moniker "death tower". Located in the southeast corner of the Sajmište complex, it was demolished in November 1945. The next Belgrade structure that would surpass the tower's height was the 101 metres (331 ft) tall Beograđanka building in 1974, almost 30 years later. Nothing remained of the tower, and a football pitch of FK Brodarac was built on its location.

Finally on 9 July 1987, Belgrade City Assembly decided to make Staro Sajmište a cultural site, thereby protecting it from real-estate expansion development. In 1992 city administration adopted a plan for the area covering 20.5 hectares of land and 1.4 hectares of the Sava river's aquatoria. On 21 April 1995, a monument in remembrance of Sajmište victims was unveiled along Sava, one day ahead of the 50-year anniversary of Hitler admitting defeat on 22 April 1945.

However, almost nothing was done to conserve the area and today Staro Sajmište is in a very bad shape. Few remaining old artists have no resources to renovate the complex themselves and the area became the gathering site for vagrants and criminals, so the ateliers are often looted. Population of the local community was 3,147 in 1981, 2,240 in 1991, 2,250 in 2002 and 1,862 in 2011.

After the new site of the Belgrade Fair was constructed on the right bank of the Sava, Sajmište became known as Staro Sajmište (old fair ground). Old sandy beach on the Sava bank in Staro Sajmište used to be called "Nica" (Nice), after kafana where the modern restaurant Ušće is located.

At one point, the locality along the quay in Block 18 was chosen as the location of the new Belgrade Opera House. In November 1968, city council adopted a decision for the new opera house to be built along the river bank between the Gazela Bridge and the newly planned New Sava Bridge. The preparatory works were planned to start in 1969 and to finish by 1972 when the proper construction was to begin. The projected deadline was set in 1975. The decision was made as part of the 100th anniversary of the National Theatre in Belgrade, as Belgrade Opera, founded in 1919, is part of the theatre and shares its building. The entire project was later scrapped and neither the opera house nor the new bridge were built. As of March 2022, the opera still has no building of its own.

The bank of the Sava in the neighboring Ušće, starting in 1991, became a location of numerous barges (Serbian splav, plural splavovi), which became central venues of the city's modern nightlife. From the summer of 1996, the splavovi spread along the bank of Staro Sajmište, too. Numerous shootouts in the venues, which included the river police and fatalities, ensued. Until that point, only turbo folk music was played in the venues, but the barges in Staro Sajmište were the first where "urban" splavovi appeared and the entire sub-culture originating in the venues became mainstream. These barges had "historical importance" for the expansion and acceptance of the venues as an authentic part of the Belgrade's nightlife and tourist offering. However, the constant public conflict between the cheap fun and criminal on the barges, and the solemnity of the neighborhood given its war history, continued for decades. Ultimately, all barges were moved out of Staro Sajmište by the late 2010s.

The quay section in front of the monument was named Bank of the Jasenovac's Victims in 2022, when a memorial plaque was dedicated between the river and the monument.

== Characteristics ==
New Belgrade's local communities

As the rest of New Belgrade developed, Staro Sajmište in time became surrounded by various important economic, commercial and landmark features of the new city. They include the Ušće Tower, Ušće Park, with the skatepark, on the north; a complex of business buildings (Naftna Industrija Srbije, Huawei, Delta Holding, Genex Apartments, Savograd), hotels (Crowne Plaza Belgrade, Hyatt Regency Belgrade) and multi-purpose building of Sava Centar, on the west; industrial facilities of Savski Nasip, peninsula of Mala Ciganlija and the Bežanija winter shelter, an arm of the Sava, on the southwest.

South of the Zemunski put, a Sajmište parking lot is located where inappropriately parked cars are tolled to. Along the quay on the bank of the Sava in Block 18, there is a Park Republika Srpska, formerly Park of the Non-aligned.

=== Block 18 ===
Southern section of local community, which covers 52 ha (130 acres), of which 15 ha (37 acres) is covered by the Park Republika Srpska and the promenade along the Sava. The rest is a completely residential area with individual housing. In the early 1990s the area was awarded to the Generalexport company for development. The company prepared the international architectural design competition, but the outbreak of the Yugoslav wars halted plans.

After 2013 the area was added to the project of the controversial Belgrade Waterfront. A plan for the neighborhood was adopted by the city in 2016. It was designed by Vanja Panić, Marko Vesković and Aleksandar Knežević. It includes the complete demolition of the existing urban tissue in the block, which covers an area of 46.8 ha (116 acres). An expanded promenade is planned along the Sava bank. Closer to the Gazela bridge, is the location of the future large square with new opera house, while on the other side, close to Staro Sajmište, there will be a smaller square and the national gallery. A new pedestrian bridge across the river is also planned, which will connect Block 18 directly to the rest of the Belgrade Waterfront. Four skyscrapers, not taller than 100 m (330 ft) are projected: one along the Gazela, one next to the Hyatt Regency Belgrade, and two in the center of the block. A local, circular shuttle train line is envisioned, which would also connect the neighborhood with the old section of the city across the river.

In January 2019, investment company "Marera Properties" announced that the new complex would include seats of all secretariats and institutes of the state government and the city of Belgrade. Total floor area built on the 0.5 ha (1.2 acres) owned by the company's should be 350,000 m^{2} (3,800,000 sq ft), and was announced as Belgrade's version of The City. The basis for the project, however, must be the 2016 project and it is not clear how much of the project company plans to participate in as their plans exceed the area they can built on at the moment. Also, it is still not decided whether the lots will be sold to the company or will it lease it from the city. As of this period no works have been done and even in the best case scenario, the construction won't start before 2020. Though it was reported by September 2019 that the plan is a no-go because of the other projects, the investor stated it is not giving up on this location.

In the previous decades, all city plans treated this area as part of the Sava Amphitheatre, one urban unit with Savamala across the river in the old section of Belgrade. This was all changed because of the project Belgrade Waterfront which officially kept this part within its scopes, but envisioned completely independent urban development. Despite the fierce opposition of the professional architects and urbanists, city refused to organize the international design competition in 2016. Because of this, and the even stronger opposition to the Belgrade Waterfront in general, it is perceived that the conventional 2016 project was chosen to "legalize" the entire project and to appease the public.

== Future ==
The dilapidated remains of the former camp complex were declared a cultural monument on 9 July 1987. In February 1992, as provided by the detailed urban plan, the neighborhood was to be fully reconstructed to its pre-war look, an idea opposed by some architects, with added memorial and commemorative objects. The entire complex was to be transformed into one large memorial, but it all remained on paper. The idea was constantly present, gaining media and political momentum in the 2010s, but by 2022 nothing has been actually done.

In November 2018, it was announced that a monument to the humanitarian Diana Budisavljević would be placed along the quay, next to the already existing memorial. Budisavljević saved 15,000 children (12,000 of which survived) from perishing in the Concentration camps in the Independent State of Croatia, operated by the Ustaše regime during World War II. City decided to erect a monument in her memory already in October 2015, but only now set the location. The monument was to be finished and dedicated in the second half of 2019. However, in November 2019, the project was relocated to the opposite side of the river to the Savamala neighborhood. The erection of the monument was postponed.

On 24 February 2020, National Assembly of Serbia adopted the law which established the "Staro Sajmište" Memorial Center. Reconstruction of the central tower, as the first step in the adaptation of the remains into the memorial center and museum began on 27 July 2022.

== Sources ==
- "Jevrejski logor na Sajmištu: istorija I sećanje".
