= Branko's Bridge =

Bridge in Belgrade, Serbia

Branko's Bridge Бранков мост Brankov most
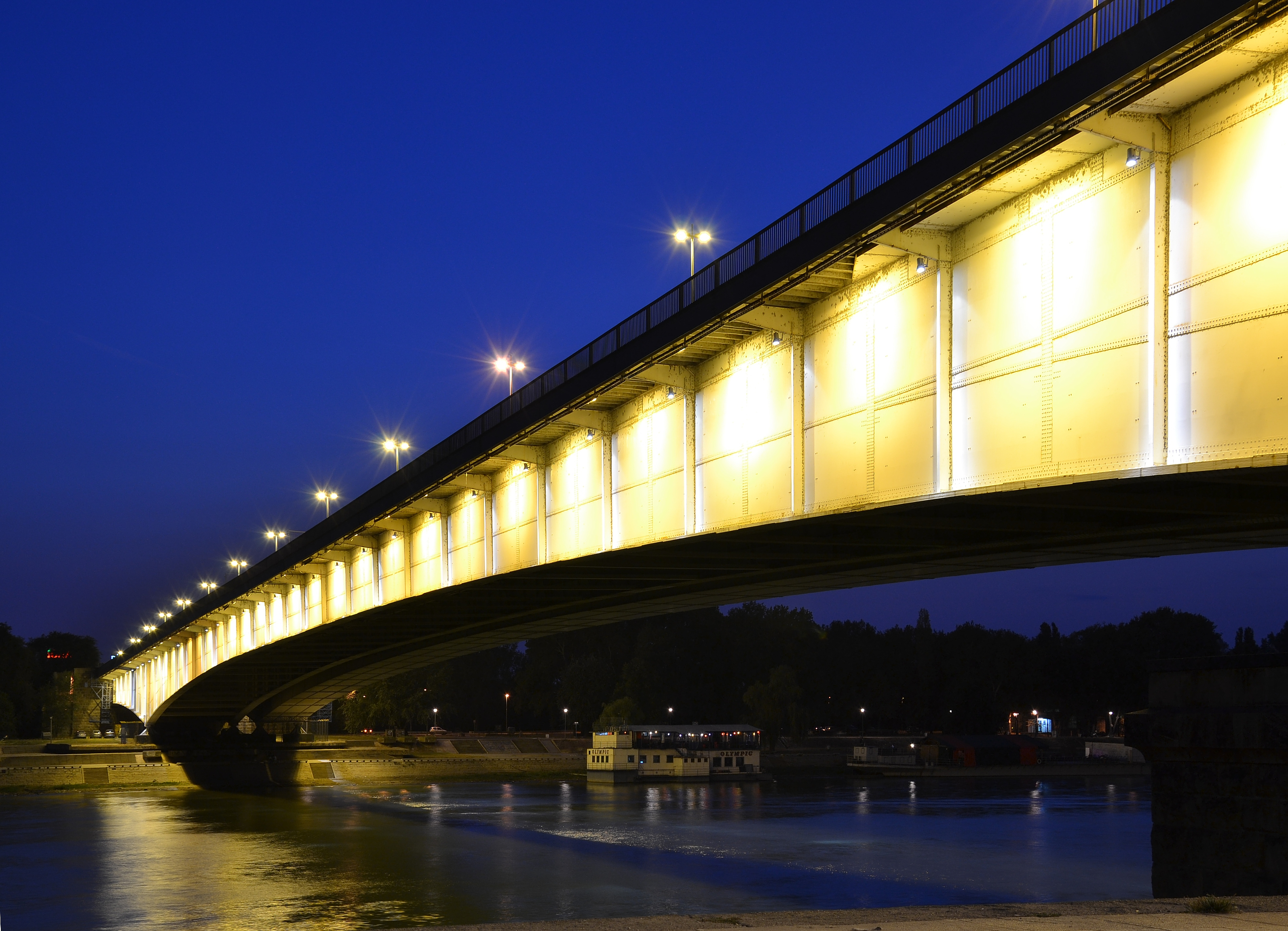
- Branko's bridge at night
- Coordinates: 44°48′53″N 20°26′54″E
- Crosses: Sava river
- Maintained by: Putevi Srbije

Characteristics
- Total length: 450 m (1,480 ft)
- Longest span: 261 m (856 ft)

History
- Opened: 1956; 70 years ago

Statistics
- Daily traffic: 90,000 vehicles
- Toll: No

Location
- Interactive map of Branko's Bridge; Бранков мост Brankov most

Branko's Bridge (Serbian: Бранков мост, romanized: Brankov most) is the second-largest bridge (after Gazela) of Belgrade, Serbia, connecting the city center with New Belgrade across the Sava river. Built in 1956 on the foundations of the 1934 King Alexander Bridge, which was destroyed in World War II, it reconnected Belgrade and Zemun as the only motorway bridge at the time. After several official and unofficial names, the present name stuck after the Brankova Street, which extends into the bridge from the direction of the old section of Belgrade.

== Location ==
On the right (eastern) bank, the bridge starts at the Sava Port, above the Karađorđeva Street, central street in the neighborhood of Savamala. The bridge is an extension of the Brankova Street, which delineates it from the neighborhood of Kosančićev Venac on the north and Zeleni Venac on the south. Through the Terazije tunnel, the Brankova connects it directly to downtown. On the left (western) bank, the bridge enters New Belgrade between the neighborhoods of Staro Sajmište, on the south, and Ušće, on the north. It extends into the Bulevar Mihajla Pupina which, passing between the Ušće Tower and Hyatt Regency Belgrade Hotel, connects it with New Belgrade and continues to the neighborhood of Zemun.

== Name ==
Official name of the bridge during the communist rule was "Brotherhood and unity bridge" (Most bratstva i jedinstva), but that name never caught on. Citizens referred to it as the "Savski most" (Sava bridge), "Zemunski most" (Zemun bridge) and the "bridge in Branko's street", as the bridge is an extension of the Brankova street, named after Branko Radičević, Serbian romanticist poet. The latter name was colloquially shortened to Brankov most (Branko's bridge) and the name prevailed. Urban myth is that the bridge got its name after the writer, Branko Ćopić, committed suicide by jumping from the bridge in 1984.

The official, administrative name is: Bridge across Sava in extension of Brankova Street.

== History ==
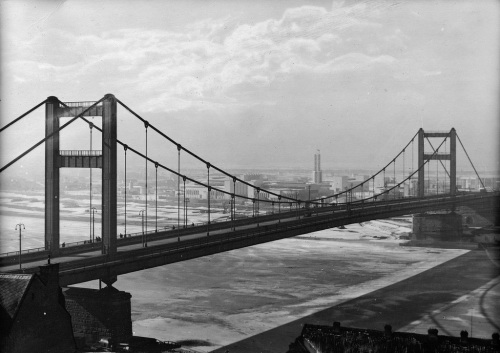
King Alexander Bridge, 1934–1941 predecessor of Branko's Bridge

The bridge was built in 1956, replacing the former chain-stayed King Alexander Bridge (built by a joint venture of Gutehoffnungshütte and Société de Construction des Batignolles) that was opened on 16 December 1934 and blown up in 1941. The bridge actually uses lower parts of the former bridge's pylons (decorated by Ivan Meštrović with two couples of reinforced concrete in Serbo-Byzantium style) as outer constraints for its two secondary spans. It is 450 m (1,480 ft) long, made as continuous steel box girder, with central span of 261 m (856 ft) and side spans of 81 m (266 ft) each. It is crossed by nearly 90,000 vehicles daily, and traffic congestions are frequent.

German company MAN is behind the original project of the bridge. Belgrade-based "Mostprojekt" company executed the project of doubling the bridge capacity in the 1970s. Head of the project team was Danilo Dragojević. Since the works were finished in 1979, the bridge has dual carriageway with three lanes in both directions and actually consists of two separate constructions in each direction.

In the Interbellum, the trams connected Belgrade to Zemun via King Alexander I bridge. After the war, in the 1950s, the general idea was that trolleybuses should take over the major role in the public transportation. Line to Zemun was opened in 1956, and in time three lines over the bridge were formed: Line 14 – Zeleni Venac-Gornji Grad (Zemun) (which was considered a successor line to the pre-war tram line), Line 15 – Zeleni Venac-Novi Grad (Zemun) and Line 16 – Zeleni Venac-Pohorska, New Belgrade. The lines were closed in 1973. However, as of 2017, over 25 bus lines of public transport crosses the bridge.

Bicycle elevator, directly connecting the promenade along the Sava and the bicycle path across the bridge, was designed by Milutin Gec, and built in 2004.

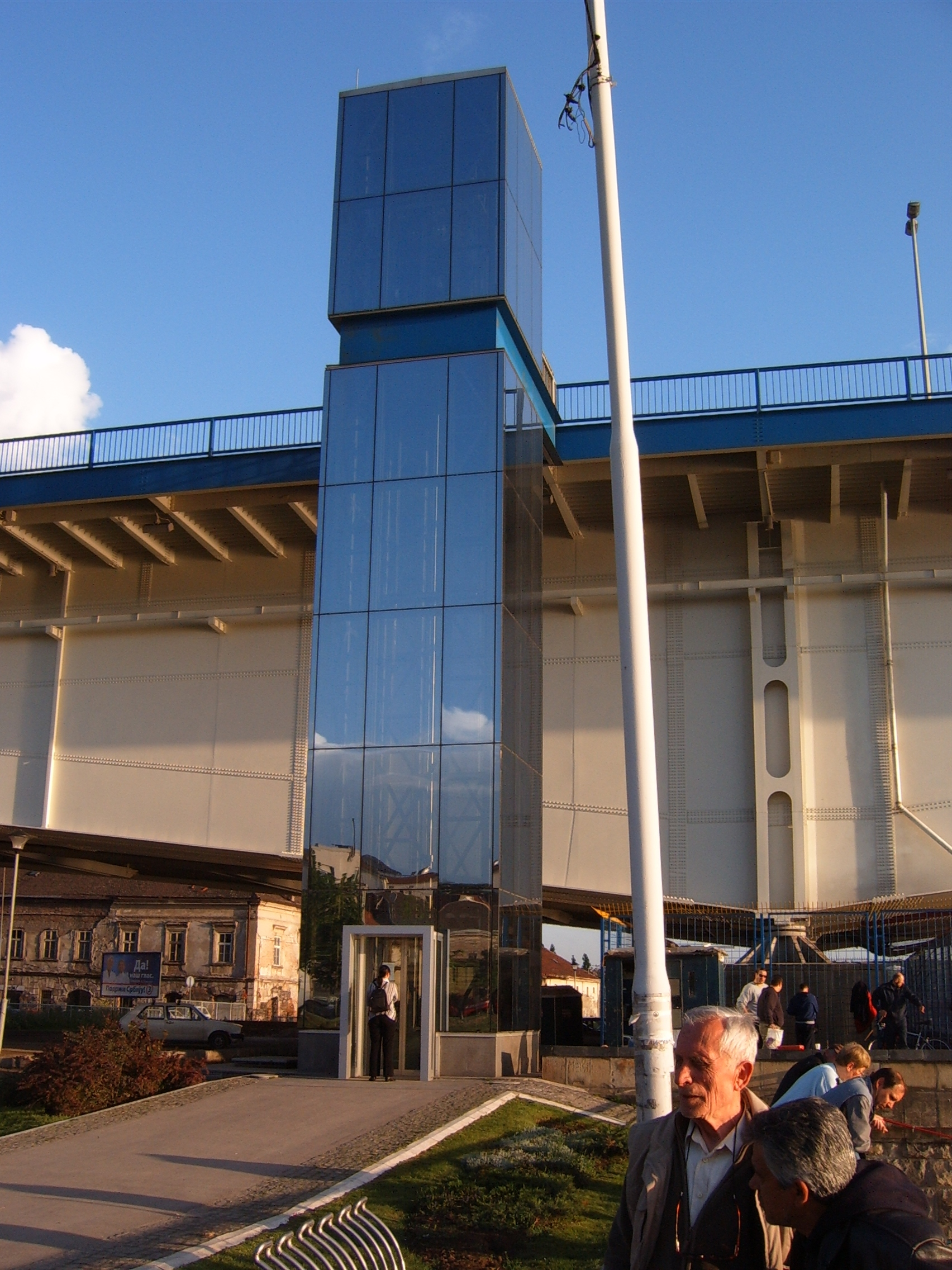
Bicycle elevator on the Old Belgrade bank of Sava river

=== 2010s reconstruction ===
In the summer of 2013, the left pedestrian and bicycle path began to show signs of deterioration. Soon, the path was completely closed. City government for several years ignored the protests of citizens who wanted for the path to be repaired and open again. The administration claimed that there are no funds in the budget and that it appears the path can't be simply repaired. Instead, the entire left side had to be completely renovated. In the summer of 2015, Mayor of Belgrade Siniša Mali announced that city will fix the problem but the tender was announced in October 2016 and in November the "Mostogradnja" company was chosen.

In late February 2017 a 210 million dinars (€1.75 million) contract was signed with Mostogradnja. Mali claimed that the study was done in 2014 and that it showed the situation was worse than previously thought. However, only in June 2017, Mali announced "preparatory works". Deadline was set at 260 days since the beginning of the "proper" works. The repair began in early July 2017, four years after the path was closed, and the deadline was shortened to 180 days, but the mayor then shortened it even more, saying it will be finished by October or November 2017.

Mali also announced that three shifts will be organized. Still in August, a month later, it was obvious that not much was happening on the bridge. Mali said that the city displaced the permit, but after the criticism, reconstruction was fastened. Mali announced new deadline, end of 2017, but few days later again changed it to 2–2,5 months. Despite the speedup, by October it was obvious that the bridge will not be finished by the end of the year. That same month, city manager Goran Vesić announced that the bridge will be completely finished by the end of March 2018, or the originally planned 9 months. In the end, all lanes were open on 9 February 2018, and, after five years, the works were fully finished and the pedestrian and bicycle path was open on 31 May 2018.

== Characteristics ==
The decorative elements by Nikolay Krasnov on the remaining pylons from the King Alexander's Bridge survived both bombings, but were removed in the 1960s by the new authorities. In June 2020 it was announced that the decorative coats of arms will be recreated on the pylons.

The bridge gained an infamous reputation as the suicide bridge. Some 40 people try to commit suicide jumping of the Branko's Bridge every year.

=== House of Architecture ===
In the late 2010s, city administration announced plans for the Spanish House building, which is located almost under the bridge on the old Belgrade side, to be adapted into the House of Architecture. In 2019 the building was returned to its pre-World War II owners in the restitution process, so the city decided to use the massive pylon of the bridge instead. Inside the pylon, there is room for an exhibition space and artistic workshops on 400 m^{2} (4,300 sq ft) of space, on two levels.

=== Police garage ===
Under the New Belgrade side of the bridge, there is an open air garage for the vehicles of the Ministry of the Interior. The parking lot covers an area of 3,000 m^{2} (32,000 sq ft) and is mostly used for the overused vehicles. In September 2019 it was announced that the area will be adapted into the Museum of the automobiles and the Museum of the Ministry of the Interior. Museum of the automobiles is currently located in downtown Belgrade, in the Majke Jevrosime Street, but the building in which it is located will be returned to the pre-World War II owners in the process of the Restitution.

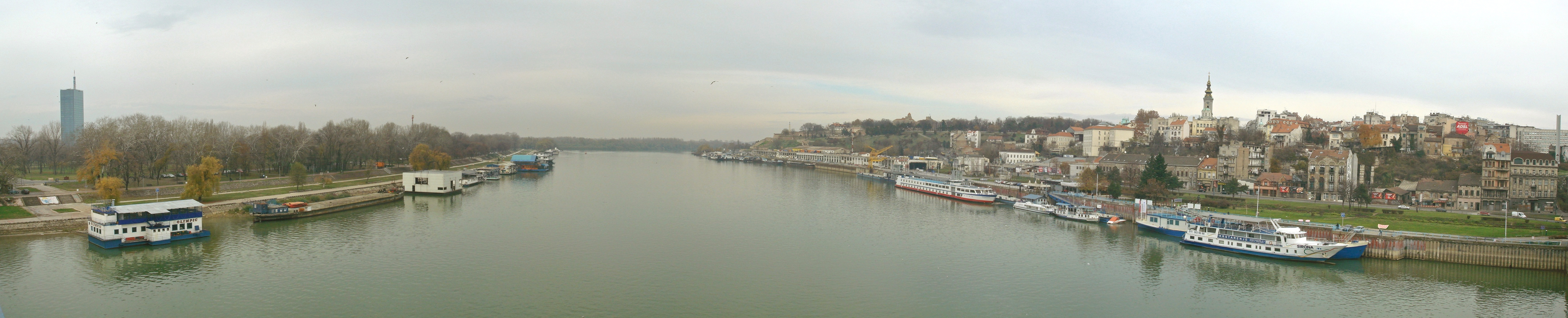
Panoramic view from Branko's Bridge

The larger area will allow for more than 50 cars to be exhibited, which is the number at the present museum. As the streets and paths in the neighboring Ušće neighborhood have been used for the rally races, they can be used also for the revue races organized by the museum. The new garage will be owned jointly by the city and the state. It is still not known whether the present garage embedded under the bridge will be just adapted or completely demolished and some other object will be built instead. As the car collection belonged to Bratislav Petković, a playwright and former minister of culture, after his death in May 2021, city announced that the future museum will be named after him.

In May 2022 it was announced that the ministry abandoned the idea of its museum under the bridge. In addition, city also announced that the Museum of the Automobiles will probably remain in its present location, as the negotiations with the new building owners are going in the good direction.

== See also ==
- List of bridges in Serbia
- Transport in Belgrade
