= 1938 Belgrade Car Show =

The 1938 Belgrade Car Show was the first car show organized in Belgrade, the capital of Serbia. Held from 5 to 15 March 1938, it was one of the nine officially registered car shows in Europe at the time. The show evolved into an annual event, today internationally labeled "BG Car Show" (Serbian: Београдски сајам аутомобила, Beogradski sajam automobila).

== Introduction ==
At the time, Belgrade was the capital of Yugoslavia, which was generally considered the "non-motorized" state. The first car appeared in Belgrade in 1903 and, statistically, in the second half of the 1930s, Yugoslavia had only 1 car on 1,000 inhabitants, while Germany had 15, United Kingdom 40 and France 53. The state decided to assemble the plan to motorize the country and popularize the automobiles, to the point that "motorization" became one of the most discussed economic, but also political, topics. In that period, Vlada Ilić - one of the wealthiest industrialist in the state and mayor of Belgrade 1936-39 - negotiated with the Ford Motor Company in order to obtain the licence to assemble cars in Yugoslavia.

The royals were also included in the process of the automobiles popularization. Queen mother Maria was an enthusiastic driver. A Romanian princess, she was driving before she married King Alexander of Yugoslavia and, as the future bride, she personally drove her mother from Bucharest to Belgrade, driving her luxurious Delage. She also drove from Belgrade to Paris, almost 1,800 km (1,100 mi). As a queen, she was often seen driving her Rolls-Royce through Belgrade, which was a major rarity at the time, both because she was a royal and a woman. She quit driving on her own, though, after her husband was assassinated in the car in 1934, in Marseille, France. The Queen was a patron of the Automobile Club of the Kingdom of Yugoslavia which organized the Belgrade Grand Prix in 1939. The still minor King Peter II was named a patron of the car show in 1938.

The idea of organizing the show in Belgrade was suggested by Daimler-Benz. Despite strong protest against the motion which came from some other European fairs, the Belgrade car show was held and accepted as one of the 9 officially registered car shows in Europe. In February 1938, the Belgrade press was announcing the event. A common place in the articles was that the show will push for the popularity and development of the cars. Velizar Janković, former transportation minister, wrote about the importance of such shows, saying that President of France and Führer of Germany open the shows in Paris and Berlin, respectively, which shows how significant these events are. Yugoslav prime minister Milan Stojadinović said that "Yugoslavia, at this moment, has only 12,000 automobiles, mostly defective", estimating that the state needs at least 150,000 vehicles. The press was vocal about the high taxes which owners of the vehicles had to pay, especially for the trucks, claiming that Bucharest, the capital of Romania, had more cars than the entire Kingdom of Yugoslavia.

== Venue ==
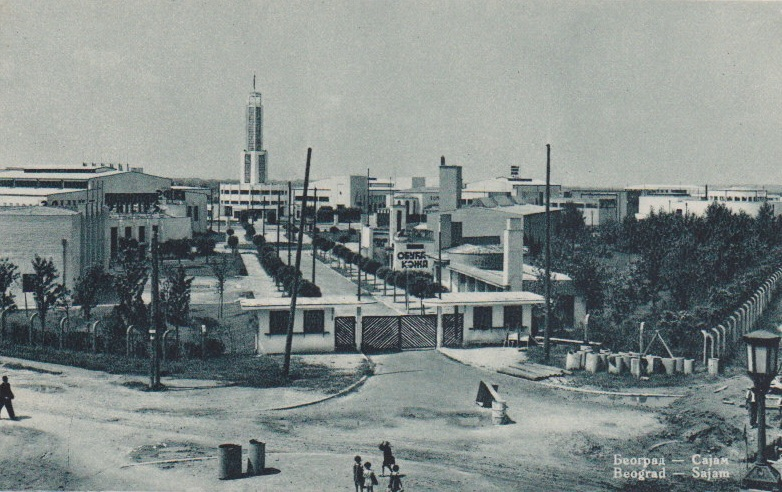
Belgrade Fair, location of the 1938 car show

The car show was held at the newly constructed Belgrade Fair venue on the left side of the Sava river, across the Belgrade at that time. The foundation stone was ceremonially placed on 6 June 1937. Works were finished in three months and the facility was open on 11 September 1937. It had modern and artistic buildings, including the high metal spike construction, which became known as the Central Tower. It was designed by the architects Milivoje Tričković, Rajko Tatić and Đorđe Lukić who envisioned it as the monumental modern complex, with the Central Tower as the domineering motif. Around the tower, the exhibition pavilions were built, including five Yugoslav, one for the “Nikola Spasić Foundation”, the national pavilions of Italy, Czechoslovakia, Romania, Hungary and the Dutch company Philips. The complex included: 17,000 m^{2} (180,000 sq ft) of roofed exhibition space, 20,000 m^{2} (220,000 sq ft) of open exhibition space, 25,000 m^{2} (270,000 sq ft) of lawns and flower beds and 22,000 m^{2} (240,000 sq ft) of roads and paths.

During World War II, the occupational German and Croatian forces turned the complex into the Sajmište concentration camp. It was never rebuilt and the new Belgrade Fair venue was open in 1957, across the river, so the old locality is today known as the Staro Sajmište ("old fairground").

== Show ==
The show was held on 5–15 March 1938 and was open by the minister of trade, Milan Vrbanić. King Peter and his mother Queen Maria later toured the show, visiting all the exhibited vehicles.

There were 107 exhibitors, from United States, Germany, France, United Kingdom, Italy, Czechoslovakia, Austria, Belgium and Yugoslavia. Due to the space constrictions, application from further 117 exhibitors were denied. Exhibitors and dealers included:

Austria

- Steyr

Czechoslovakia

- Aero
- Jawa
- Škoda

Germany

- Adler
- Auto Union (conglomerate of Audi, DKW, Horch and Wanderer)
- BMW
- Büssing
- Daimler-Benz
- Krupp
- Mercedes
- Opel
- WWaggonbau Görlitz

Italy

- Fiat
- Lancia

United States

- Buick
- Chevrolet
- Dodge

Altogether, 375 vehicles were displayed. There were 158 passenger cars, 65 trucks, 10 buses, 18 chassis, 105 motorbikes and bicycles, 10 car engines, 3 tractors and 1 excavator. The most popular displays were those of Opel, BMW, Fiat, Dodge, Chevrolet, Buick and Mercedes. Commercial vehicles were presented by Mercedes, Büssing, WUMAG and Krupp. In total, the show had 40,000 visitors and most of the cars that were purchased during the exhibition were the limousines, as the car was still considered a luxury in Yugoslavia at the time.

Opel exhibited a specially designed car which had a shell made of transparent Plexiglas so that visitors could see the machinery inside the car. It was a major novelty at the time.

== Legacy ==
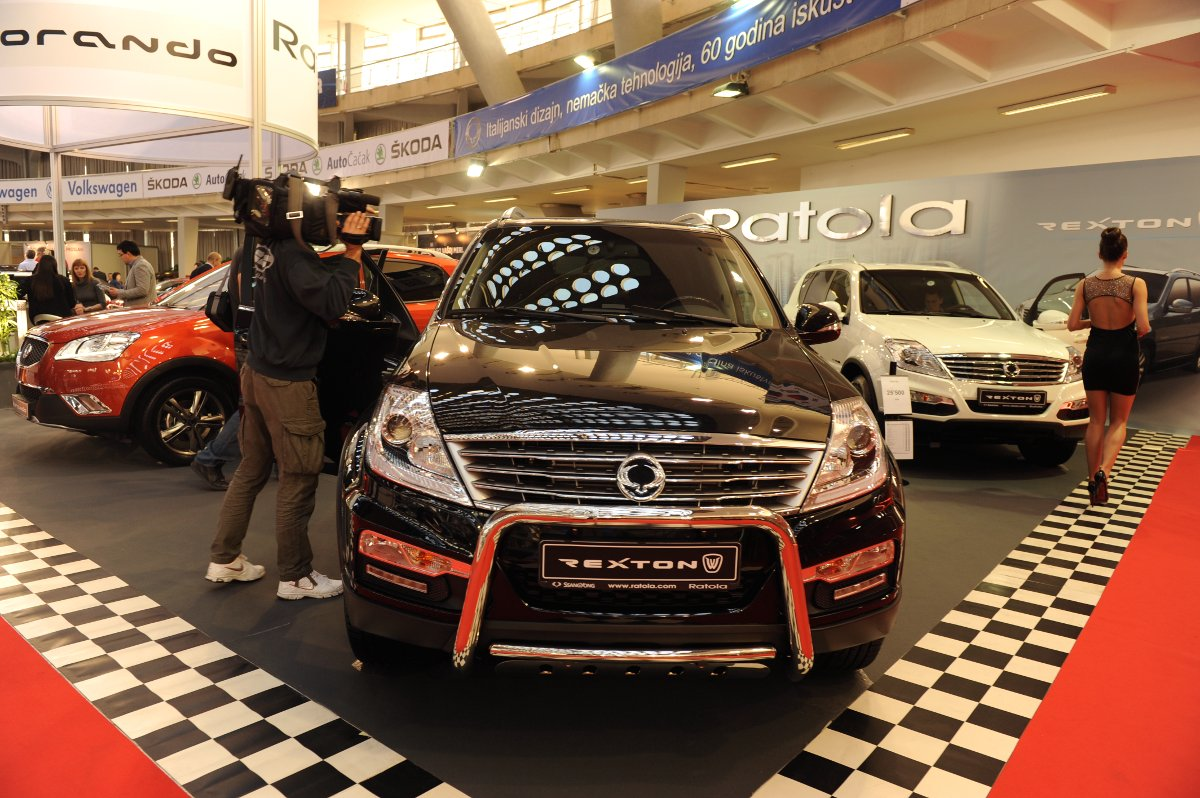
2014 Belgrade car show

The number of exhibitors grew in the second and third shows, which were held in 1939 and 1940. Despite the outbreak of World War II, the exhibitors came from Germany, Italy, United States, Protectorate of Bohemia and Moravia. Especially popular were the cars with the wood gas engines. The fourth show, planned for the May 1941, was cancelled after the German invasion of Yugoslavia, which included the heavy bombing of Belgrade, began on 6 April 1941.

After the new Belgrade Fair was finished in 1957, the car show was revived. Originally, it was held in 1957, 1959 and 1961 as part of the International Fair of Technics, and became a location for establishing the business connections between dealers. In 1965 the car show had 525.000 visitors while in 1966 the first fair rally under the European criteria was organized and the show officially entered the International calendar of car shows. In 1970 the show had 586 exhibitors from 23 countries from 4 continents on the exhibition area of 52,000 m^{2} (560,000 sq ft). It was the first time that the racing cars were also displayed. In 1971, despite cancelling of the show in Frankfurt and troubles with the Paris Motor Show, 403 exhibitors came to the Belgrade show.

In the 1980s, the fair was held to high regard and was compared to the shows in Geneva, Barcelona or Turin. In 1991, despite the heavy economical and political crisis in Yugoslavia and the quotas for the import of the equipment and technologies imposed by the state which reduced the number of exhibitors, the show was still the largest one in the Eastern Europe. Despite the period of wars and economic sanctions in the 1990s, the fair survived. Since 2013 it is officially named "DDOR BG CAR SHOW".
