= Mala Ciganlija =

Mala Ciganlija Мала Циганлија
- Urban neighbourhood
- Interactive map of Mala Ciganlija
- Country: Serbia
- Region: Belgrade
- Municipality: New Belgrade
- Time zone: UTC+1 (CET)
  - Summer (DST): UTC+2 (CEST)
- Area code: +381(0)11
- Car plates: BG

Mala Ciganlija (Serbian Cyrillic: Мала Циганлија) is an urban neighborhood of Belgrade (the capital of Serbia), located the municipality of Novi Beograd.

Mala Ciganlija is a peninsula on the left bank of the Sava river, just over 1 km long and 200 m wide. It encloses a small bay, called Zimovnik (winter shelter), where the facilities of the shipyard Belgrade are located. Technically, it is an extension of the Novi Beograd's Block 69.

Once almost uninhabited and completely forested, in the last 20 years its western half has been entirely urbanized and industrialized, in connection to the expansion of the shipyard and the growing number of gravel selling and separating facilities on the Sava's bank. The eastern half of the peninsula is still mostly intact and the bridge of Novi železnički most (New railway bridge) passes above its easternmost tip.

The name of the peninsula means little (Ada) Ciganlija, compared to the much larger island of Ada Ciganlija to the southeast.
