= Grantovac =

Coordinates: 44.805412°N 20.466054°E

Grantovac Грантовац
- Urban neighbourhood
- Interactive map of Grantovac
- Country: Serbia
- Region: Belgrade
- Municipality: Vračar
- Time zone: UTC+1 (CET)
  - Summer (DST): UTC+2 (CEST)
- Area code: +381(0)11
- Car plates: BG

Grantovac (Serbian Cyrillic: Грантовац) was an urban neighborhood of Belgrade, the capital of Serbia. It was located in the Belgrade's municipality of Vračar.

== Location ==
Grantovac was located along the Njegoševa street.

== History ==
Originally, it was a vast cornfield, full of reeds and stubble. When U.S. consul Edward Maxwell Grant bought the land in the area and built his house, urbanization began and the newly formed neighborhood, extension of Istočni Vračar from Cvetni Trg to Kalenić, was named Grantovac after the consul.

== Characteristics ==
Neighborhood was known for many restaurants, barrooms and cafes in the Njegoševa street at the beginning of the 20th century, including one with the same name as the neighborhood (Grantovac). However, the name of the neighborhood, just like the adjoining Krunski Venac, later fell into obscurity and it is not used today.

However, local residents still refer to the residential block bounded by the streets Smiljanićeva, Njegoševa, Krunska and Kneginje Zorke, as Mali Grantovac ("Little Grantovac").

At the corner of the Beogradska and the Njegoševa streets, a kafana Vardar was located. One of the shareholders of the venue was the king of Yugoslavia himself, Alexander I Karađorđević. The Vardar was famous because one of the most popular Serbian singers, Mijat Mijatović, was hired to entertain the guests.
