= Beograđanka =

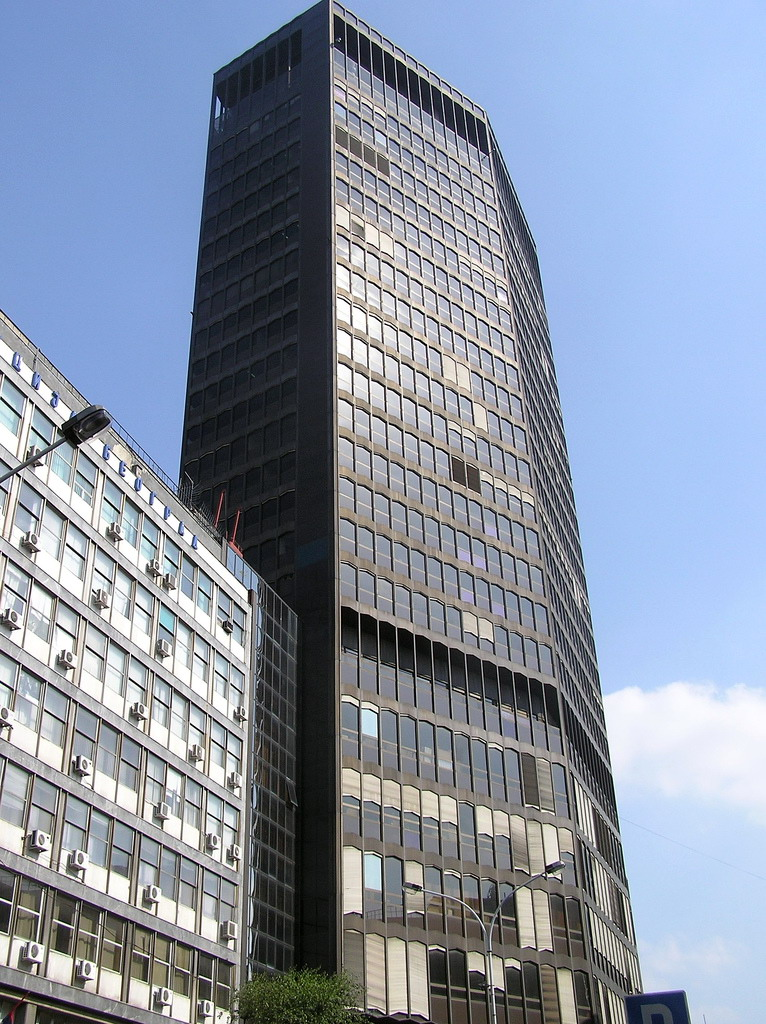
- Beograđanka in September 2006.

- Location within Belgrade

General information
- Type: Office and retail
- Location: Belgrade, Serbia
- Coordinates: 44.80736°N 20.46338°E
- Construction started: 1969
- Completed: 1974
- Opened: 22 April 1974; 52 years ago

Height
- Tip: 127 m (417 ft)
- Roof: 101 m (331 ft)

Technical details
- Floor count: 24 above ground 5 below ground
- Floor area: 40,000 m^{2} (430,000 sq ft)

Design and construction
- Architect: Branko Pešić

The Beograđanka (Serbian Cyrillic: Београђанка; pronounced [beǒɡradʑaːŋka], lit. "Belgrade Lady"), officially Belgrade Palace (Serbian: Палата Београд, romanized: Palata Beograd, pronounced [palǎta beǒɡrad]) is a modern high-rise building in the Belgrade downtown area.

A 101 m (331 ft) tall structure, it is one of the symbols of the city and representative of the "golden age" in the development of Belgrade during the 1965–1974 mayoral term of Branko Pešić.

== Location ==
The building is located at the intersection of Kralja Milana (central city street), Resavska, and Masarikova Streets—near the tripoint of the Savski Venac (whose territory the building lies on), Vračar and Stari Grad municipalities. Neighborhoods in the vicinity include Cvetni Trg to the east, Krunski Venac to the northeast, Andrićev Venac to the north, London to the northwest, and Savamala to the west. Three parks are close to the building: Pioneers Park, Manjež and Park Gavrilo Princip. Students Cultural Center and Yugoslav Drama Theater are just east of Beograđanka.

== History ==
House of Jeremija Milivojević was built on the location in 1890. It was a one-floor, corner house. The facades were ornamented in the Academism style. In 1941, right before World War II began in Yugoslavia, the plans were made to build the high-rise on the location. The investor was to be the Teokarević family, a major Serbian textile magnates. The plans were scrapped due to the outbreak of the war, and the Milivojević's house remained until the mid-1960, when it was demolished. Planned pre-war commercial highrise was designed by architect Grigorije Samojlov.

Construction of the building began in 1969. It was built by two people of the same name and from the same part of Belgrade, Zemun: mayor of Belgrade Branko Pešić and architect Branko Pešić, who designed it. Mayor Pešić laid the charter of the building's construction into the foundations on 29 March 1969 and the building was opened on 22 April 1974.

During the digging of the foundation, ten strong water springs were discovered. Eventually, they were all conducted into the city sewage system. The construction was executed using the latest methods in constructing and during the next 5 years, some 20,000 workers of all kinds were employed in erecting the building.

== Characteristics ==
The building is located in the heart of old city center, stretching from Terazije to Slavija Square, with an emphasized aspiration to dominate with its high 24-story part as the city's reference point. For decades, an observation deck was operational on the 22nd floor. There was also a restaurant "Beograđanka" next to it, known for its decorative gold plated tiles. The restaurant was closed in 1989 when "Studio B" purchased this floor.

The façade of the building consists of aluminium drapes and the double paned thermopane glass. The outer blinds are operated electronically. The material was imported from Italy. City chiefs were choosing between the darker and the lighter color of the façade material. They opted for the darker one, as it was of higher quality, but the choice wasn't universally greeted at the time. The entire façade covers 11,500 m^{2} (124,000 sq ft).

Total floor area of "Beograđanka" is 40,000 m^{2} (430,000 sq ft).

In the 1980s, the disco club Šestica (The Six) was located on the building's sixth floor. Though operational for only three years, it was quite popular because it provided patrons with an excellent view of the city. It was the only club in Belgrade at the time that was not located in an adapted utility room or a basement. Other hospitality venues were restaurant "STB" (formerly "Plato") on the 5th floor (known for its decorative gold plated tiles) and club B-74.

=== Plateau of Đoko Vještica ===
After the idea of Đoko Vještica (1939-2008), journalist from Studio B, a drinking fountain was built on the plateau at the Beograđanka's entrance. Named the "Spring of Life" (Vrelo života), it was opened on 6 April 1982, to commemorate the 6 April 1941, and German bombing of Belgrade in World War II. After Vještica's death, the plateau was named in his honor. The plateau was embellished with the green wall along the Masarikova Street in 2014. The wall was fully renovated in April 2021.

== Assessment ==
The building invoked both admiration and criticism. Some architects thought that the Interbellum skyline of Belgrade, which the Beograđanka disrupted, should be preserved. The main problem, however, appeared to be the dark colored façade. The critics ascribed it to the current fashion in architecture after the Toronto-Dominion Centre, while citizens who opposed it said that dark building doesn't fit to the white city (meaning of "Belgrade") and that dark paint should be scratched. It was compared to the Space Odyssey's Monolith or a tombstone, and called "Black Widow", a common, colloquial nickname in Belgrade for dark buildings, or those with black rooftops.

Size and location were also criticized, due to the narrowed view on the Church of Saint Sava and problems with parking, communal services and deliveries. Some architects simply dismissed the entire design as "being black", without evaluating all the other aspects of the building. Others asked was it really necessary to "thrust" it into the old core of the city. Still, with the lower annex, the building was nicely connected to the much lower objects in the adjoining block of buildings.

Despite Yugoslavia being a Communist, one-party state at the time, the architects chose for major project were selected from two dominant branches, either professorial or from business sector. However, though a professor, architect Pešić was directly appointed by the party, and this lack of public competition caused discomfort among the architects. Pešić was considered to be an excellent engineer but a weak creative mind. As soon as the building was finished, his colleagues massively criticized him personally, as a good professor but the one who would never escape the anonymity if not selected by the party for this job, and for the design itself. However, construction proved that Pešić was capable for the task, and in time only the criticism of the façade color remained.

Pešić declined to debate on the issue or to refute the criticism, believing he has done the right thing, designing Beograđanka just the way it is. His colleagues ignored the building for the next two decades. In the second half of the 1990s, at the meeting in the Belgrade's Institute for the Protection of Monuments, a session was organized to select the post-war objects which will be protected as the cultural monuments. Architect Zoran Manević suggested Beograđanka, but was heavily criticized by other architects and his motion was almost unanimously rejected.

After several decades, it proved that the building neither damaged the Belgrade's cityscape from any of the four sides (Syrmia, Banat, Zvezdara, Avala), nor "darkened" the White city as represents only one piece in the skyline's mosaic. Actually, it turned out to be a good positioned tower-like counterpoint in the panoramic view of the city. Becoming symbol of Belgrade, in time it was labeled as an object which deserves social gratitude and accolade for the designers, a building that no one would be ashamed even today, including the problematic elements.

Still, though described as iconic and the most imposing building in the old section of Belgrade, even in the 2020s some architects criticized its design.

== Tenants ==
The building is almost completely owned and operated by the City of Belgrade. The first several stories were occupied by the Robne kuće Beograd department store; on the other floors offices of Studio B (formerly city-owned TV and radio station) and Happy TV station are located. On the other floors, there are business premises, as well as the head offices of IKEA for Serbia and other Belgrade media are also located in the building. Blic daily still has some offices in Beograđanka although they have moved most of their business to a new building.

After the privatization of the "Robne kuće Beograd" in 2007, owner of the first four floors became "Verano Motors". Studio B is the only tenant who has been in the building since it was opened in 1974. As of June 2012, the basement floor is occupied by a Mercator retail store.

== Future ==
In January 2019, deputy mayor Goran Vesić announced the plans by the city to sell the building as it is the "pure loss" for the city. As the building is under the preliminary protection (meaning that it has to be treated like it is protected unless the protection process is rejected), so the prospective buyer can't demolish it.

In July 2020, city offered half of the building for sale. The asking price was set at €20,6 million. The bidding was canceled on 31 July as no one applied. Architects, economists, citizens' groups and political opposition started criticizing city's actions in these matters, especially with the similar, much longer failed process conducted for another symbol of Belgrade, the Sava Centar congressional center. Opposition politicians openly accused city administration of corruption and theft. Through repeated, collapsed biddings, the prices of the objects are being reduced each time, as allowed by the law, until they are sold to some tycoon close to the ruling establishment for a very low price. In August 2020 city again offered the same space for the lowered price of €16,5 million.

On 9 September 2020, offered part of Beograđanka was officially sold to the "MPP New Project", a daughter company of the "Marera Properties", for the offered price plus additional €8 million in future investments, as they were the only participants in the bidding. "MPP New Project" was founded two weeks prior to the bidding, with the capital of 100 Serbian dinars or €0.85. "Marera Properties" previously acquired several objects in Belgrade, founding separate companies for purchasing each one. Economic reporters and opposition parties regarded the sale as the confirmation of their claims that the entire job will be done "within the family", or the ruling party. Iconic building was sold for the price of €860 /m2, which is considered "miserable" for downtown Belgrade. Reporters discovered that "Marera Properties" basically exists only on paper, and that behind it is the Russian fund seated in Cyprus connected with offshore companies from the British Virgin Islands, which also recycles money from Serbia. Several present and former executives of the company turned out to be, directly or indirectly, connected to Siniša Mali, Serbian finance minister and former mayor of Belgrade.

In January 2021 it was announced that the reconstruction will be finished by the end of the year. Decorative lights will be added along the facade of the building, from the fifth floor to the top.

== See also ==
- List of tallest structures in Serbia
