= Čubura =

Urban neighbourhood in Vračar, Belgrade, Serbia

Čubura Чубура
- Urban neighbourhood
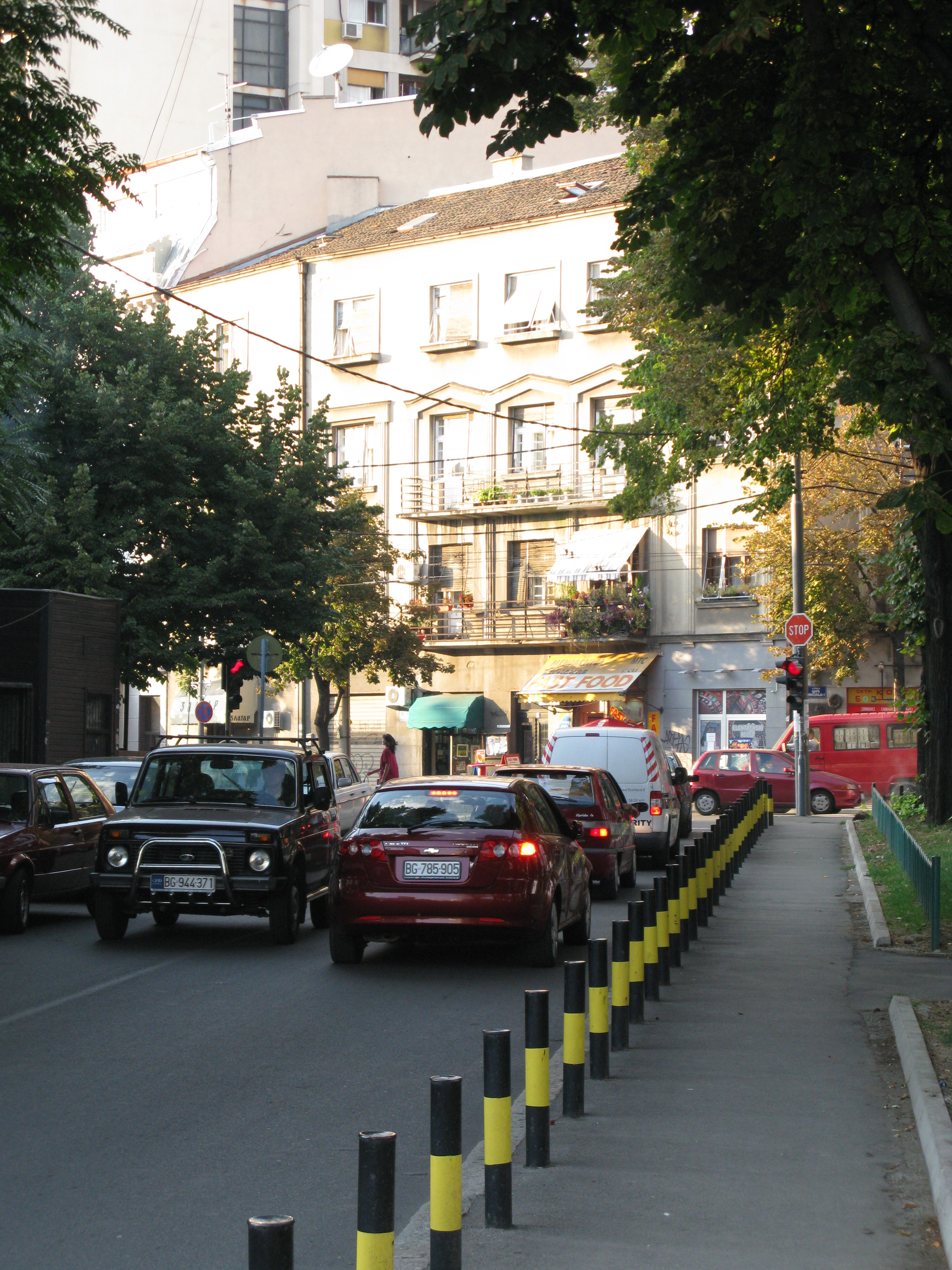
- Čuburska Street

- Location within Belgrade
- Coordinates: 44°47′49″N 20°28′32″E
- Country: Serbia
- Region: Belgrade
- Municipality: Vračar
- Time zone: UTC+1 (CET)
  - Summer (DST): UTC+2 (CEST)
- Area code: +381(0)11
- Car plates: BG

Čubura (Serbian: Чубура), Serbo-Croatian pronunciation: [t͡ʃǔbura]) is an urban neighborhood of Belgrade, the capital of Serbia. Located in Belgrade's municipality of Vračar, it is a synonym of the city's bohemian life.

== Location ==
Čubura stretches along the crossroad of the streets of Makenzijeva-Cara Nikolaja II and Maksima Gorkog. It borders the neighborhoods of Vračar and Gradić Pejton (sub-neighborhood of Čubura) on the west, Kalenić on the north, Crveni Krst on the east, Neimar on the southwest and Pašino Brdo on the south.

== History ==
Čubura originated as a village around the pond and the banks of the stream of Čuburski potok. The village began to transform into the suburb in the 1880s. It was a period when a Romani colony was resettled from the neighborhood of Zerek (Dorćol area, around the Kralja Petra Street), so they moved to Čubura.

The stream is not visible today as it has been completely conducted underground and runs through the Belgrade's sewage system (which is a case with many streams and creeks in the urban parts of Belgrade). The stream originated at the modern crossroad of the Kičevska and Baba Višnjina streets. It was then flowing downhill in the south direction, reaching the northern slope of Pašino Brdo. There, it turned in the west-southwest direction and flew into the Mokroluški Potok at modern Autokomanda neighborhood, close to the Topovske Šupe locality. Its lower valley was used for construction of the Južni Bulevar (South Boulevard) street, which today marks the southern border of the modern neighborhood of Čubura. While the stream flew above the ground, there was a small bridge across it at the lowest point, connecting Čubura and Pašino Brdo.

Spring of the stream was also in this area, and, after a short flow, the water was collected in a small cylindrical trough (Serbian: stublina, Turkish: çubura) and this is how the village, and the future neighborhood got its name. The romanticized version claims that the name comes from čubar, Serbian name for the purple summer savory flower which allegedly was abundant around the former stream. The trough apparently didn't collect the water from the stream itself, but from one or two additional springs with fresh water in the valley.

Before complete, joint German-Austro-Hungarian occupation in World War I, Austro-Hungarian army temporarily entered Belgrade, from 3 to 14 December 1914. Already on 4 December they erected gallows in Čubura, and in several other locations around the town, for hanging civilians.

There was a monument to the Romani people who died in World War I fighting in Serbian army. The monument is mentioned in 1924 work Spomenici na okrajini Beograda ("Monuments on the edges of Belgrade") by Milan Vukićević. The stone monument was located right above the stream and had inscription "Serbian Gypsy Youth to its heroes killed 1912-1918". The rapid urbanization of Čubura ensued after the war ended and by 1939 when "Vreme" magazine wrote in detail about the neighborhood, the monument wasn't mentioned anymore. Based on the writings, it was located somewhere close to the modern park. In March 2018 it was announced that the monument wasn't destroyed. In 1924, it was moved to the yard in the Gospodara Vučića Street, in the nearby Pašino Brdo, not far away from its original location. The lot is today owned by the Romany organization "Društvo Rom" and the monument has been updated with some names of those killed in World War II.

According to the city government's plans published in early 2007, a residential section along the even side of the Maksima Gorkog street is designated for demolition for the future expansion of the street.

In September 2022, construction of the large sports center was announced. It will be located in the block bordered by the streets of Južni Bulevar, Šumatovačka and Vardardska, where the elementary school King Peter II Karađorđević and modern residential complex Marmilend are situated. The center will replace the middle section of the block, which was occupied by various outdoors sports fields. Sports complex "Vračar" will include a building with multipurpose sports hall, several smaller halls and galleries, and outdoor swimming pools, including Olympic one.

== Characteristics ==
=== Bohemian quarter ===
The population of Čubura was 13,498 in 2002. The neighborhood is characterized by narrow streets and thanks to many kafanas in the area, it became known as one of the centers of the city bohemians. Unlike Skadarlija which is considered to be a fancy and fashionable place, Čubura used to be a gathering place of common people. Decades old neglect of the neighborhood by the city governments also added to this feel. It is recorded that in 1941, on the short distance from Slavija along the Makenzijeva street, there were 30 kafanas. After 1945, the Vltava kafana, for example, became known as the gathering place of Belgrade's lawyers, Mala Vltava of the former political prisoners from the Goli Otok while the more affluent citizens gathered in Trandafilović. The entire area surrounding the modern park was described as "one vast kafana, open all hours".

However, with changes in recent years, kafanas are being closed one by one and the 'spirit of Čubura' is slowly disappearing. One of the last kafanas, Kolubara, was transformed into the betting facility while Čuburska lipa ("Ćubura's linden tree"), was demolished in early 2018. It was named after the linden tree, planted in 1924, brought from Lipik spa. The tree was also cut. With the new buildings being constructed, many white and mimicking the Interbellum architecture in the kitsch style, architects described Čubura as being filled with "sugar-coated cake-houses".

=== Čuburski Park ===
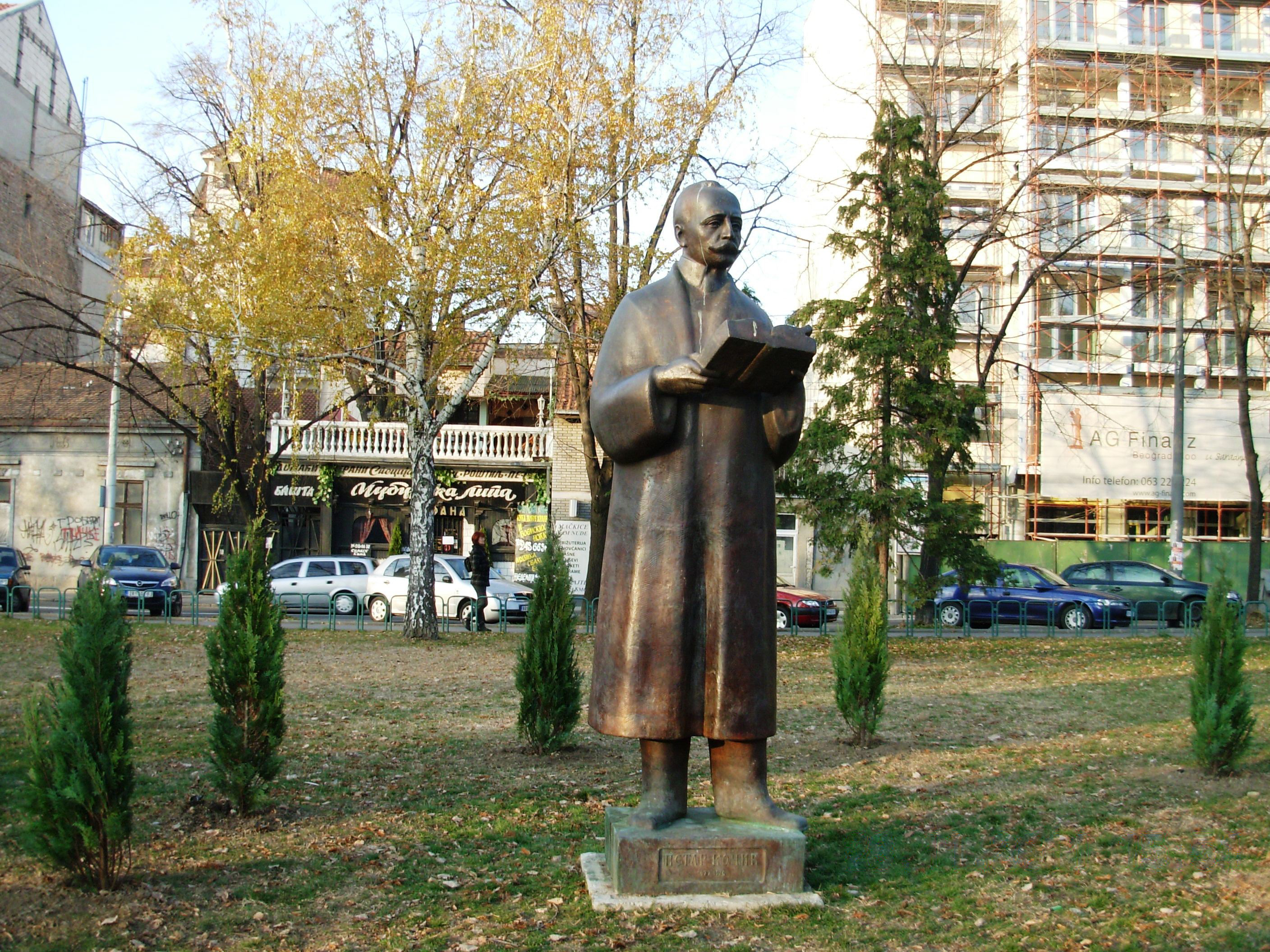
Monument to Petar Kočić in Čuburski Park

Small park (Čuburski park) is located in the neighborhood, bounded by the streets of Maksima Gorkog, Cara Nikolaja II, Čuburska and Orlovića Pavla. It covers an area of 11 hectares (27 acres) and is mostly occupied by the children playgrounds (three of them) and seasonal amusement park. In November 2007 a major reconstruction of the park began which includes replacement of the complete humus layer and all of the old and sick trees, placing a sewage system beneath the park to prevent creation of ponds in the park during rains so as the re-arrangement of the pathways bordering the park. Reconstruction was finished in April 2008.

On 12 May 2009 a monument to the Serbian writer Petar Kočić was dedicated in the park. In the period when he lived in Belgrade, Kočić lived in the vicinity of the park. The duplicate of the monument, work of Dragoljub Davidović, was erected in front of Kočić's birth house in the village of Stričići, near Banja Luka in Bosnia and Herzegovina.

On 16 June 2019, another monument was placed in the park, at the corner of the Maksima Gorkog and Cara Nikolaja II streets. It is dedicated to the famed self-taught builders from Crna Trava. Residents of Crna Trava are regionally famous as the best builders, which are colloquially described as the builders who "built half of Yugoslavia: University of Belgrade Faculty of Philosophy, University of Belgrade Faculty of Law, Stari dvor, Novi dvor, Government of Serbia, Princess Ljubica's Residence, Kafana Dva Jelena in Skadarlija, Hotel Moskva, Hotel Bristol, factory chimneys over 300 m (980 ft) tall, and countless other. The monument represents nameless "Crna Trava builder" (Crnotravac neimar) and was sculptured by Zoran Kuzmanović. The park was chosen as it was the location of the Kikevac kafana, which was the central gathering point of the Crna Trava migrants in Belgrade. A duplicate of the 2.25 m (7 ft 5 in) tall sculpture on the stone pedestal was erected in Crna Trava itself, on 29 October 2019.
