= Ksenija Bulatović =

Serbian architect

Ksenija Bulatović, (Serbian: Ксенија Булатовић; born 5 May 1967) is a Serbian architect.

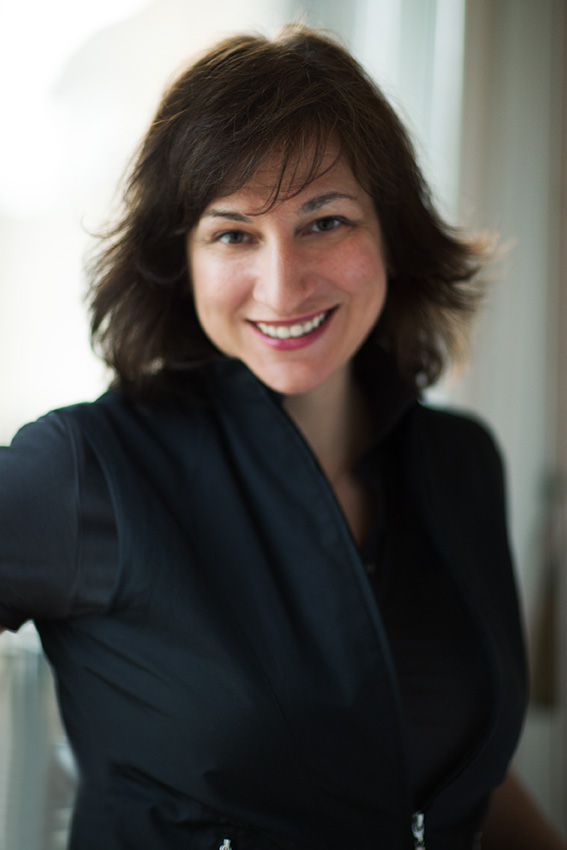
Ksenija Bulatović, Serbian Architect CEO

== Life and career ==
Ksenija Bulatović was born in 1967 in Belgrade, Serbia. She studied under Prof. Milan Lojanica – member of the Serbian Academy of Science and Art in Belgrade, and received a degree in architecture from University of Belgrade Faculty of Architecture. After graduating, from 1992 to 1997 she worked with her former teacher Prof. M.Lojanica as a University Assistant in the area of Architectural Design and Planning at the Faculty of Architecture in Belgrade. From 1992 to 2015 she also cooperated with many well known and established companies and architectural studios from Belgrade, such as: Studio ARCVS, Biro A43, Eurosalon – Home Market, Me.COM, Delta Invest, Serbian Orthodox Church, Serbia Film Center. In 2005 she founded and incorporated the architectural firm CubeX. Bulatović is an active member of Association of Belgrade Architects and Association of Serbian Architects, and throughout her career, she has entered and won many architectural competitions and awards. In 2008, she began work on experimental theme in architecture – Symbiosis with Saša Naumović, Ksenija Bunjak, Aleksej Đermanović, Dara Fanka...In 2014/15 was a member of the jury of AICA-Artist In Concrete Award in Mumbai, India. Participate in many International conferences mostly with project of Symbiosis: Symbiotic architecture.

== Projects in Belgrade ==
=== Cvetni Trg ===
Despite previous recent works, new city government after 2013 headed by mayor Siniša Mali decided to do another reconstruction of Belgrade's Cvetni Trg or the "Flower Square". As soon as the project, headed by Bulatović, was chosen, both professional and public opinion were already against it. Nevertheless, city government pushed the project and the new square was officially opened on 16 December 2015. The small square which gave a feel of being cosy and tucked in, was completely buried under the white concrete. It was soon nicknamed the “Concrete square”, and seen as a sickly white, empty, sterile and resembling a great tomb. It was soon evident that, apart from being completely botched, it was poorly done and that it may need new reconstruction soon. As the public discontent didn't stop, Bulatović authored a text in Politika, titled Emptiness is an event, trying to explain her work and saying that the "basic quality of an urban area is reaction of the human senses" and that it is important "whether some area is pleasant or desirable to spend time in it". Preachy and philosophical text only provoked the public opinion even more, and she got a harsh public response from composer Ivana Stefanović titled Great white emptiness replying that the "event" actually makes you feel negative and unpleasant spending time in it and that the spirit of Cvetni Trg, that of the small city garden, was killed and replaced by the graveyard silence. Dramaturge and university professor Predrag Perišić said that someone "ripped out the flowers and planted concrete" and that "it is a rare case that one urban complex, after the reconstruction and lots of resources spent on it, looks worse than before". Architect Zdravko Zdravković criticized the city government in general for hiring only the architects of the same mind, ignoring all the other professions which participate in the urban development. He added that after the reconstruction Cvetni Trg completely lost its function and was transformed into the "barren, empty space", but that "failures, luckily, can be repaired". Despite the public outcry, mayor Mali said that the new square is “probably the most beautiful in Belgrade”.

=== Gardoš ===
In March 2018 it was announced that the top plateau of the Gardoš hill and the area surrounding the Gardoš Tower will be revitalized. Without public architectural design competition, the job was directly entrusted to Bulatović by Milutin Folić, Belgrade's city architect, and Dejan Matić, president of Belgrade's Zemun municipality to which Gardoš belongs.

== Books ==
- Žitorađa Municipality: Old Rural Houses and their Typology, Belgrade (2015) Authors: Ksenija Bunjak and Ksenija Bulatović

== Gallery ==
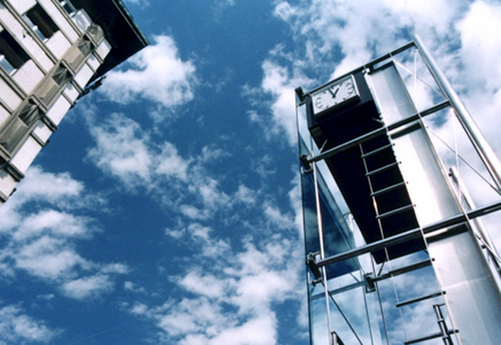
Millennium Clock 2000, Beograd – First Prize

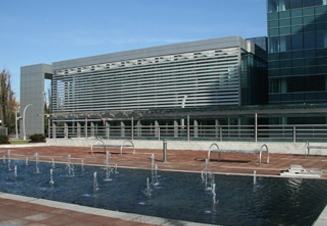
Government of Republika Srpska, Banjaluka – First Prize

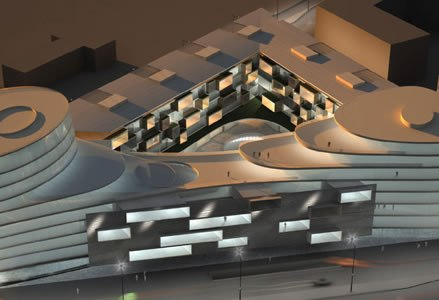
"The Capital Plaza" Podgorica - First Prize

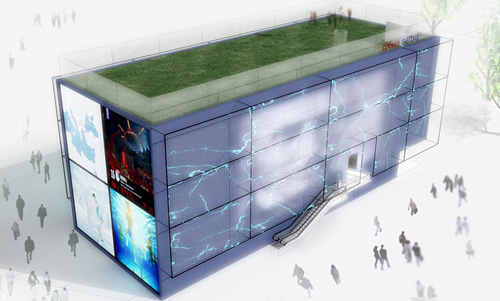
Shanghai, China, Serbian Pavilion for EXPO 2010

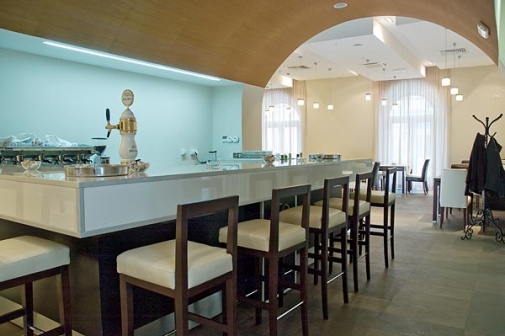
Hotel Platani, Trebinje–Reconstruction and Interior Design

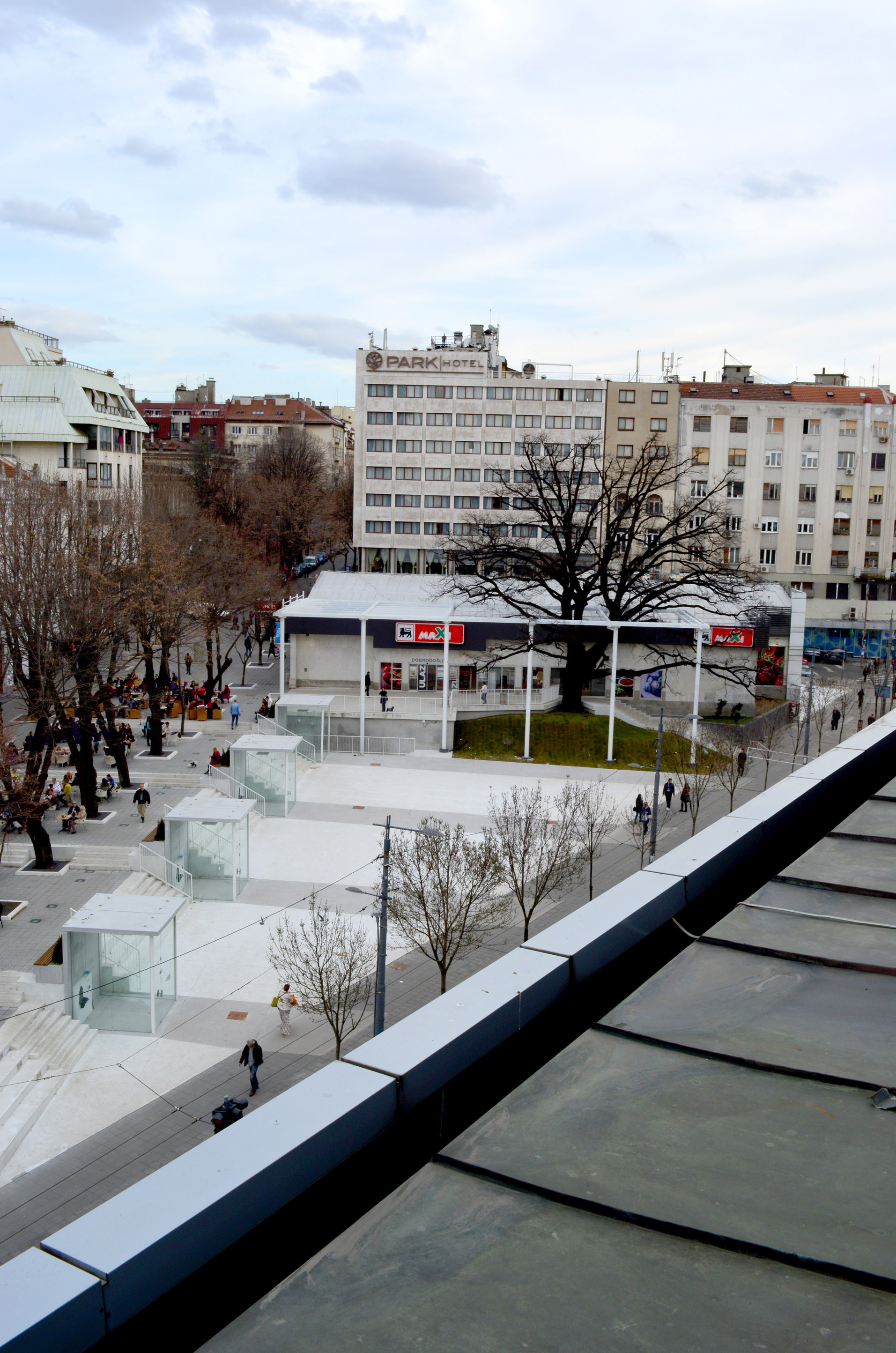
Flower Square Beograd - First prize

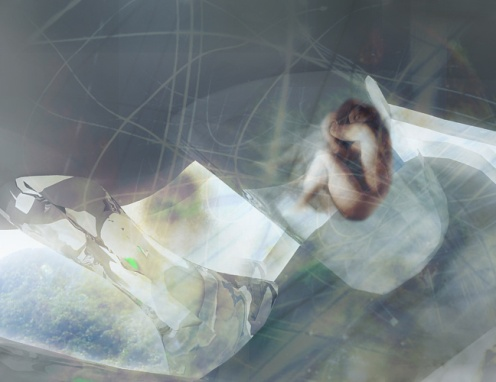
Symbiosis: Symbiotic architecture – Experimental Project

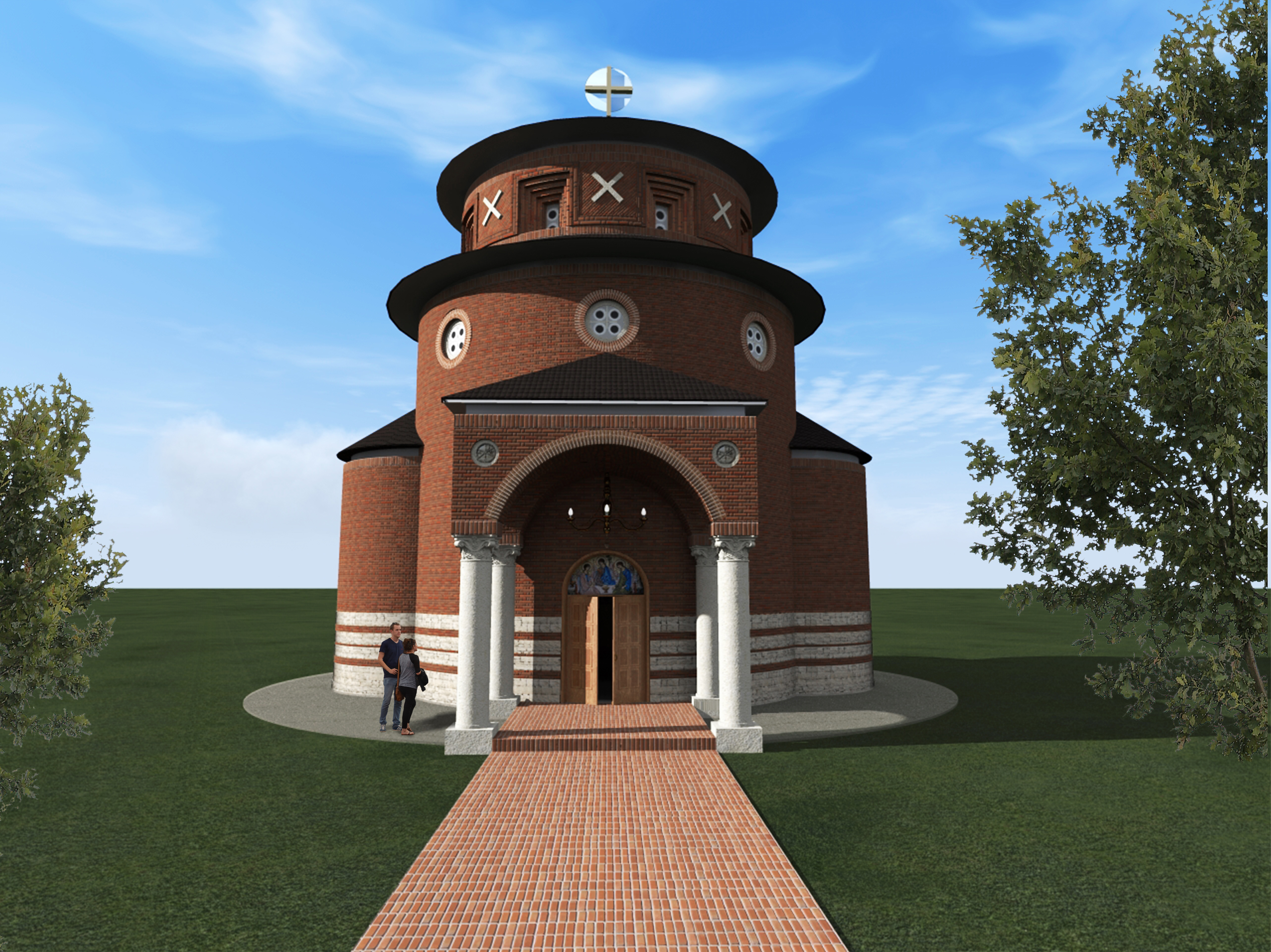
Church-Rotonda Sv. Nikole in Nova Gradiška, Croatia 2018.
