= Gradić Pejton =

Gradić Pejton Градић Пејтон
- Urban neighbourhood
- Etymology: Peyton Place (after the fictional town)
- Location within Belgrade
- Coordinates: 44.797389°N 20.474445°E
- Country: Serbia
- Region: Belgrade
- Municipality: Vračar
- Established: 1970
- Time zone: UTC+1 (CET)
  - Summer (DST): UTC+2 (CEST)
- Area code: +381(0)11
- Car plates: BG

Gradić Pejton (Serbian Cyrillic: Градић Пејтон, trans. Peyton Place) is an urban neighborhood of Belgrade, the capital of Serbia. Located in Belgrade's municipality of Vračar, it is a unique craftsmen settlement in the city. Gradić Pejton is made of wood, and irregularly shaped in the honeycomb-style to preserve existing trees.

== Location ==
Gradić Pejton is located 2 kilometers south-east of downtown Belgrade (Terazije), beginning on the corner of the Makenzijeva and Čuburska streets, right across the small Čubura park. It is a small, westernmost extension of the neighborhood of Čubura that spreads east and north of Gradić Pejton, which in turn borders the neighborhoods of Neimar on the south and Vračar on the west.

== Characteristics ==
Gradić Pejton is one of the most unusual parts of Belgrade. It is an artisan settlement with many small shops and many of them are practicing crafts which are now rare and slowly dying out in big cities like Belgrade: stamp-cutters, printmakers, framemakers, keymakers, glassblowers, etc. In addition to this, several kafanas and cafés are located in the neighborhood.

Several more characteristics separate Gradić Pejton from the rest of Belgrade. It was built from 1968 to 1971 by the architect Ranko Radović (1935-2005) who, in the period of the most massive building of the concrete dwelling blocks in Belgrade's history, decided to make a commercial complex completely made of wood, and to blend it into the Čuburski Park. Partially because of the wish not to disrupt the atmosphere of the Belgrade's famed bohemian quarter of Čubura and partially because of the environment preservation, not one single tree was cut on the lots designated for Gradić Pejton as the complex was designated in the honeycomb pattern to protect the already existing trees.

After the TV series Peyton Place, immensely popular in Serbia at that time, the neighborhoods was named after it. This was later followed by several other towns in Serbia like Kraljevo, Pristina, etc.

== Future ==
The city government announced in 2005 that it will tear down the entire Gradić Pejton and build a parking, cultural center and a kindergarten instead. This prompted the swift reaction of the Belgraders who oppose the demolition of the neighborhood even though it is currently in bad shape, which was used as a pretext by the city architect Đorđe Bobić. This is just one of the major clashes of the city architect and the inhabitants of Belgrade (the others include the building of Belgrade Opera not in the central Square of the Republic but in the uninhabited area of Novi Beograd and removal of the Belgrade ZOO from Kalemegdan in downtown Belgrade to Surčin, 20 kilometers away).

City government then proposed that some of the shops may be rebuilt but the shop owners refused this. Also, the idea of city architect to place a stone memorial commemorating that architect Ranko Radović's work was once here was refused by the Radović's widow Mirjana Popović-Radović who claims that she will sue city government if they do that because "no one has right to wash his own actions with the name of her husband".

In 2016 city and municipal administrations announced reconstruction of the complex, but it remained on paper only.
