= Kalenić, Belgrade =

Kalenić Каленић
- Urban neighbourhood
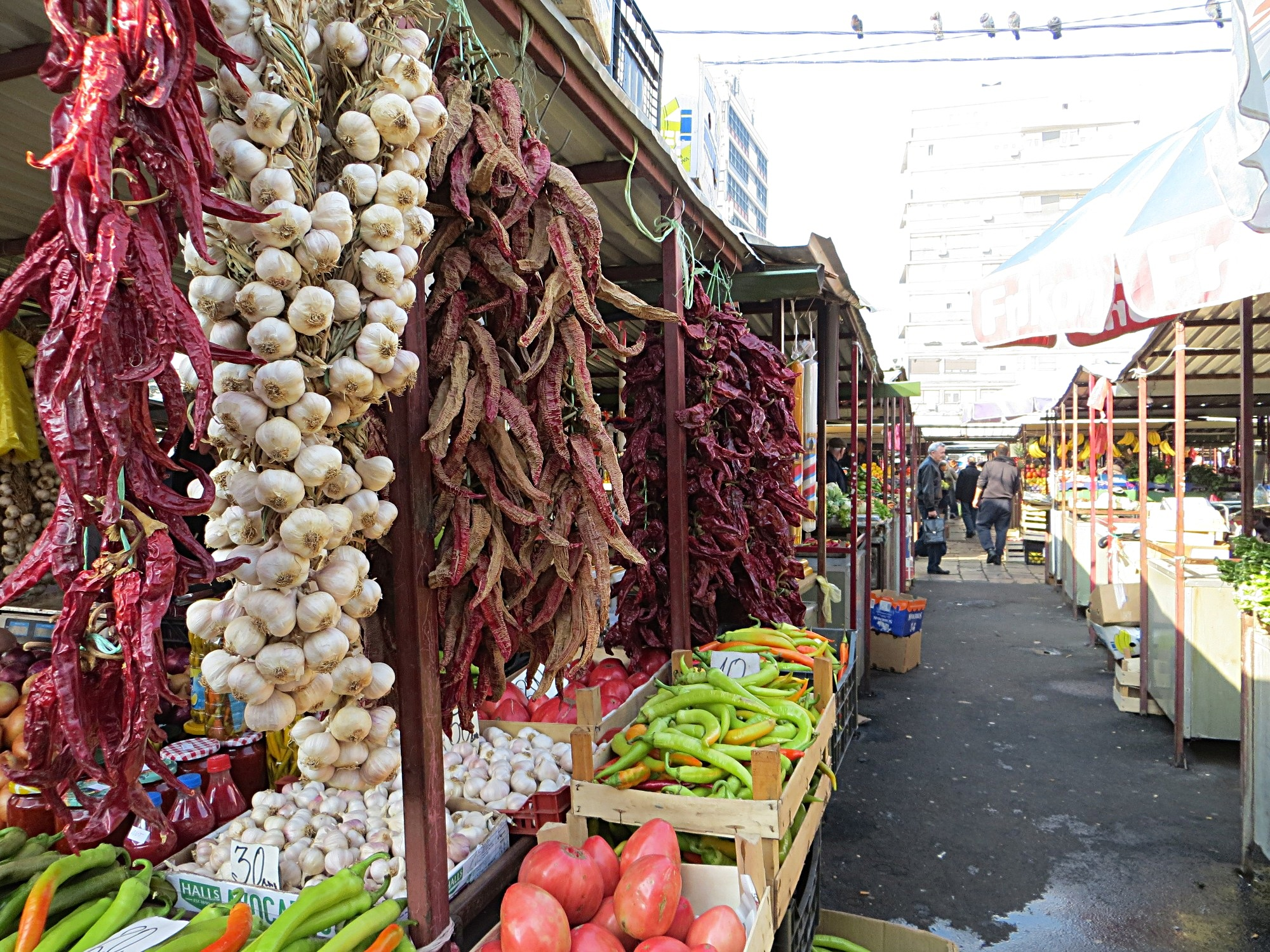
- Kalenić Greenmarket

- Location within Belgrade
- Coordinates: 44°48′00″N 20°28′31″E
- Country: Serbia
- Region: Belgrade
- Municipality: Vračar
- Time zone: UTC+1 (CET)
  - Summer (DST): UTC+2 (CEST)
- Area code: +381(0)11
- Car plates: BG

Kalenić (Serbian Cyrillic: Каленић, Serbo-Croatian pronunciation: [kǎle̞nit͡ɕ]) is an urban neighborhood of Belgrade, the capital of Serbia. It is located in Belgrade's municipality of Vračar, centered on the Kalenić market, one of the main open greenmarkets in Belgrade.

== Location ==
Kalenić is located 2 kilometers south-east of downtown Belgrade (Terazije), on the northern slopes of the Vračar hill. It extends into the neighborhoods of Čubura on the south, Crveni Krst on the east, Vukov Spomenik on the north and Krunski Venac on the west, in the direction of Cvetni Trg.

== History ==
Industrialist Milan Vapa founded the first paper mill in Belgrade in 1905, at the corner of Vuka Karadžića Street and Topličin Venac in the neighborhood of Kosančićev Venac. In 1907 he relocated it to Kalenić. He moved his business again in the new cardboard factory, built from 1921 to 1924, in Bara Venecija (Cardboard Factory of Milan Vapa).

The area became known as the Kalenića gumno (Kalenić's threshing floor), as it historically served this purpose. The lot was later purchased by the magnate and benefactor Vlajko Kalenić, hence the name. The green market, built in 1926, also bears his name, so as the neighboring Kalenićeva Street.

The Society for the Construction of Catholic Church in Belgrade was established in 1920. It has been headed by the archbishop of Belgrade Ivan Rafael Rodić from 1924, who organized various charity gatherings to gather funds for the future Roman Catholic cathedral in Belgrade. City administration donated the lot, bounded by the streets of Kičevska, Mileševska and Sinđelićeva, roughly where the modern Park Vojvoda Petar Bojović is today. The Archdiocese was quite satisfied with the location of the parcel, but the problem of ownership surfaced. The city donated the land which it didn't officially own, so the plans failed, followed by the severe protests by both the Society and the Archdiocese. Funds were then used to expand the Saint Ladislav Chapel in 1925-1926, which functioned as the temporary cathedral of the Archdiocese since 1924. Proper Roman Catholic cathedral in Belgrade, after continuous failed offering of various locations during the Interbellum, was ultimately never built.

In 1943, as part of the strategic bombing campaign within the scopes of the oil campaign against Nazi Germany, the U.S. began massive bombardment of the oil fields and refineries in Romania, known as the Operation Tidal Wave campaign. On their return, as Belgrade was important strategic point, the bombers threw their unused bombs on the city. German occupational forces dug several pools across the city to storage water for extinguishing the fires. One of such pools was built close to the market. In time, citizens began to use the pools for swimming and the Germans didn't try to stop them so they became sort of public swimming pools. The pools were ultimately re-filled by 1950.

In 1993, a monument to vojvoda Petar Bojović was placed in the park bearing his name. The bust is work of Drinka Radovanović. It was fully renovated in 2020.

A kafana named Kalenić is located in the neighborhood. It was open in 1938 and purchased by an engineer Adolf Sabo a year later. Sabo perished in Holocaust and the restaurant was nationalized. In May 2018, during the Restitution Law, the ownership of the Kalenić was transferred to the Belgrade's Jewish municipality, as Sabo had no living descendants. As Kalenić is today one of the famous Belgrade kafanas and is considered a "symbol of Vračar", Jewish community stated that the kafana will continue to work.

== Characteristics ==
Kalenić is a busy commercial and residential area, a commercial and administrative center of the municipality as the building of the Municipal Assembly of Vračar is also located here. It is also one of the main traffic routes in the city, but as the neighborhood is older one, the streets are mostly narrow which causes traffic jams on daily basis (streets of Maksima Gorkog, Golsvordijeva, Krunska, etc.).

For several decades, Kalenić was administratively organized as a local community (mesna zajednica), a sub-municipal administrative unit within Vračar. It had a population of 7,442 in 1981 and 6,815 in 1991.

== Kalenić market ==
Kalenić market or Kalenićeva pijaca (Serbian: Каленићева пијаца) was founded in 1926. That year, the central city market, the Great Market, was finally closed and city founded several new markets throughout the city, further from the downtown: Zeleni Venac, Kalenić, Bajloni and Jovanova market. Originally it covered only 500 m^{2} (5,400 sq ft), but it grew in time. During the German occupation in World War II, as the food became scarce, city administration parceled the market's lot into gardens, and awarded the parcels to its clerks and other employees to grow vegetables and other food.

The market has two main entry gates. One, from the Njegoševa Street, was built during Interbellum. It is made of brick, with wooden roof. The other one, from the Maksima Gorkog Street, was built later. The main recognizable feature of the market were yellow bricks from which it was originally built.

It is one of the most vibrant, popular open-air markets in Belgrade, and sees hundreds of shoppers each day. Stalls are roughly grouped according to their wares, and primarily feature locally-produced seasonal fruits, vegetables, artisanal cheeses, and a range of homemade baked goods, pickles, jams and fruit preserves. Concentrated in the centre and along one far wall are self-contained shops selling all types of meats (fresh and smoked) and fish; tucked in among these is a healthfood store well-stocked with everything from soymilk to organic tofu and dried seaweed. Imported condiments, sauces and chocolate drink mixes can also be found.

Kalenić features much more than just food: a vast range of fresh-cut flowers and potted plants are concentrated near a secondary entrance; new sleepwear, socks and underwear are sold at stalls which also carry second-hand shoes, sweaters and furs; antique housewares are dotted throughout the market, as are religious candles and Orthodox icons; batteries, laundry soap, lightbulbs, replacement vacuum bags, inexpensive pots and pans line another of its interior walls. It also features the gauntlet of pet stalls selling puppies, rabbits, small birds, fish and turtles out front. High-quality Serbian fast food shops ring its outer wall.

=== Reconstruction ===
The market was scheduled to be reconstructed and remodeled in Spring 2008 with completion in early 2009. The redevelopment will create Belgrade's second high quality market with closed and open areas and extended facilities. During the works the market will be relocated to a park alongside the present site.

However, full reconstruction began only on 26 March 2016. It was projected to consist of 4 phases and to last for 2 years. The idea of covering the market, either with the roof or glass, was abandoned. But by 2017 citizens showed dislike of the changes and pointed to the poor quality of the works. In October 2017, city company publicly addressed the criticism in an offensive manner. Some of the architects joined the criticism, saying that the rows of a new, black tin shops which encircle the market, resemble the funeral homes. The reconstruction was labeled as the "pinnacle of a mess, chaos, lack of taste and functionality" in the "devastation of Vračar".

In May 2021, city announced further works in total of five phases. Reconstruction is planned to include complete roofing of the market, restoration and expansion of the Njegoševa Gate, refurbishment of the plateau and four drinking fountains, and construction of gastro-block, where food will be prepared and served. The Maksima Gorkog Gate will be relocated, to allow the planned expansion of the street. The outer Plateau of Soja Jovanović will also be reworked, with cascade-like stairs, though it was already reconstructed in May 2021.
