= Šiljakovac =

- Suburban settlement
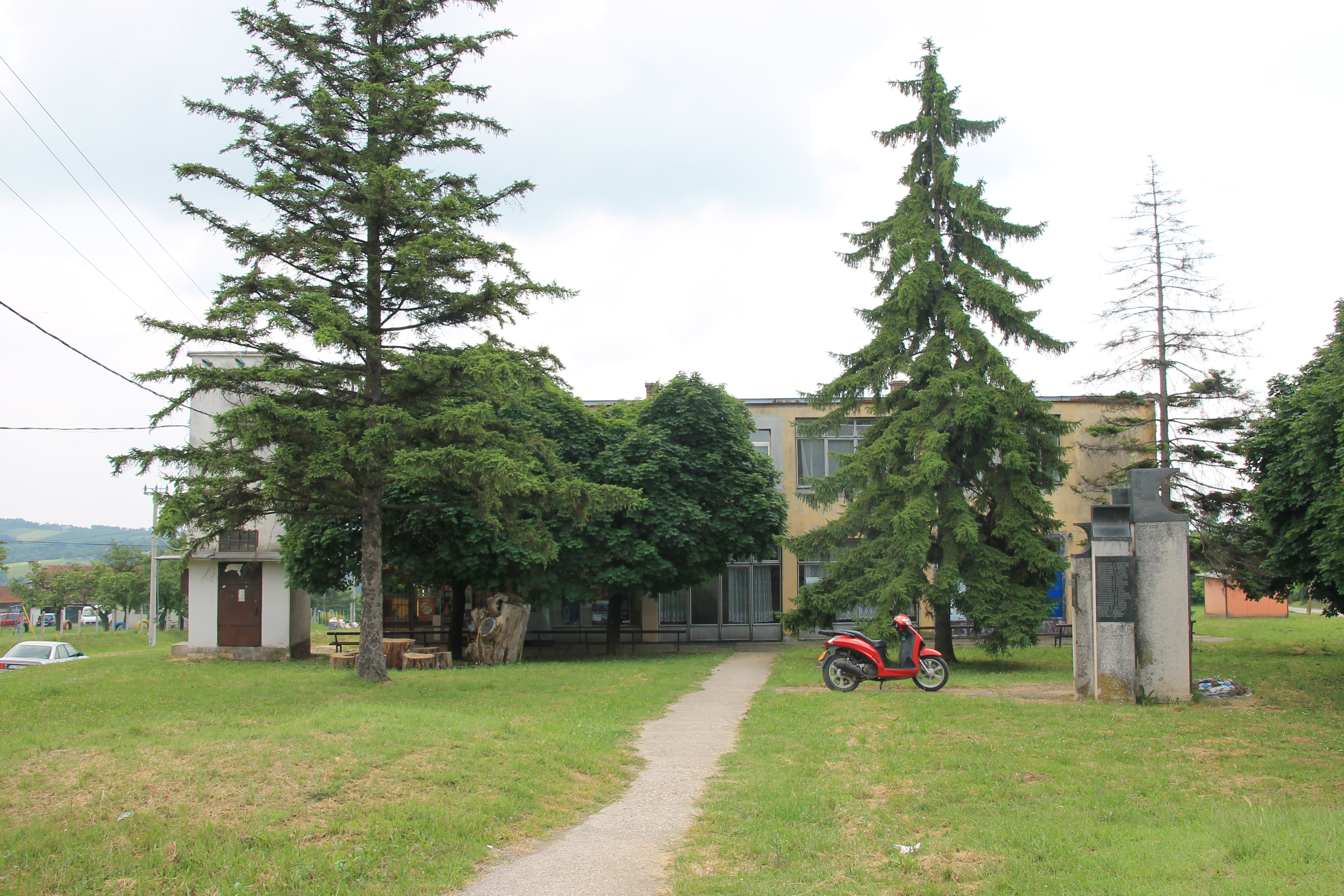
- Šiljakovac

- Location within Serbia
- Coordinates: 44°33′55″N 20°19′57″E
- Country: Serbia

Area
  - Total: 13.82 km^{2} (5.34 sq mi)

Population (2011)
  - Total: 632
  - Density: 45.7/km^{2} (118/sq mi)
- Time zone: UTC+1 (CET)
  - Summer (DST): UTC+2 (CEST)

Šiljakovac (Serbian Cyrillic: Шиљаковац) is a suburban settlement of Belgrade, Serbia. It is located in the municipality of Barajevo.

It is located in the western part of the municipality, southwest of the municipal seat of Barajevo and 2 km east of the Ibarska magistrala (Highway of Ibar).

Šiljakovac is a small, depopulating rural settlement, with a population of 620 (Census 2002).

Local football club is FC Šiljakovac.

Šiljakovac's hamlet of Bare is the location of two oaks which were estimated to be 220 years old in 2013, thus being considered as the oldest known trees on the territory of Belgrade.

== See also ==
- Cvetni trg
