= Neimar =

Neimar Неимар
- Urban neighbourhood
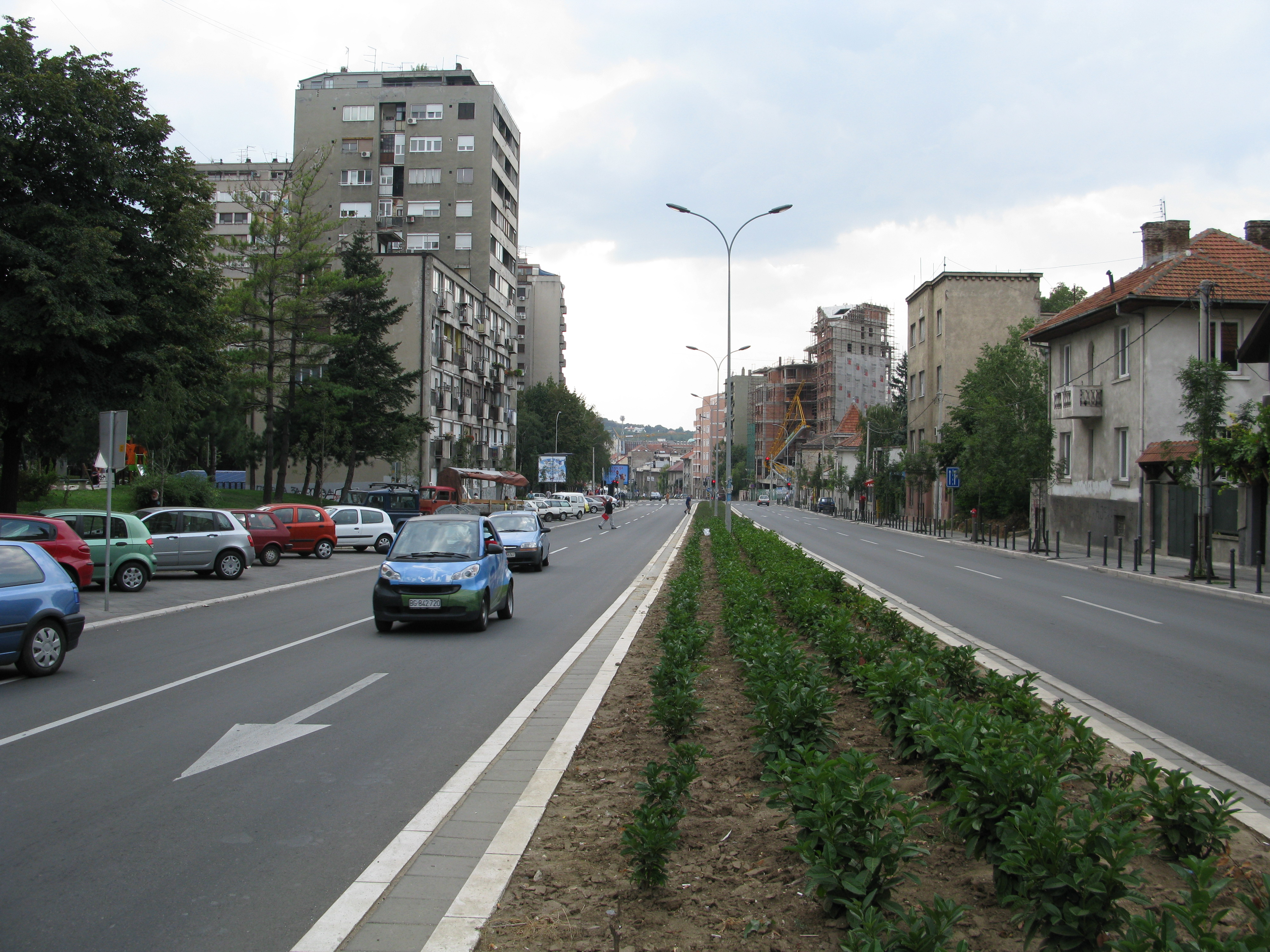
- South Boulevard, Neimar to the right

- Location within Belgrade
- Coordinates: 44.794511°N 20.471625°E
- Country: Serbia
- Region: Belgrade
- Municipality: Vračar
- Time zone: UTC+1 (CET)
  - Summer (DST): UTC+2 (CEST)
- Postal code: 11050
- Area code: +381(0)11
- Car plates: BG

Neimar (Serbian Cyrillic: Неимар) is an urban neighborhood of Belgrade, Serbia. It is located in Belgrade's municipality of Vračar.

== Name ==
The settlement was originally named Kotež Neimar. Kotež is a Serbian rendering of the French cottage, a suburban settlement of individual residential houses. Neimar was the name of the construction society on whose land the neighborhood was built. The word itself, neimar, means a builder or mason, and entered Serbian language via Turkish from the Arabic mi'mar.

== Location ==
Neimar is located 2 km (1.2 mi) south-east of downtown Belgrade, in the south-western corner of the municipality. It occupies the south-eastern slope of the Vračar hill, which descends to the former valleys of the creeks of Mokroluški potok (now a highway) and Čuburski potok (now a South Boulevard). It borders the neighborhoods of Vračar on the north, Čubura on the north-east (sub-neighborhood of Gradić Pejton) and east, Autokomanda on the south while on the west it leans on the Karađorđev Park.

== History ==
Uninhabited slope from Čubura to the Čuburski potok valley (modern South Boulevard) was included into the city's construction plans in 1906. At that time, it was occupied by the fields, orchards and vineyards, mostly belonging to the merchant Panta Tadić. First regulatory plan, which included proposed streets layout, is from 1907 and the land was parceled in 1908. It envisioned an irregular street plan, two squares and a park in the south-east part. Construction company "Neimar" was founded in 1919 and in 1920 they purchased the land from Tadić. Original plans for the neighborhood were made in 1921 by the Viennese architects Emil Hoppe, Otto Schönthal and Marcel Kammerer, all pupils of Otto Wagner. After several disagreements with the city administration, the plan was finally approved on 12 June 1924.

The area set for urbanization covered 24 ha (59 acres). The plan envisioned that the settlement will have only family villas. The villas were organized around the 8 small squares. The grid laid by the architects is the one still existing today. However, despite the massive illegal building throughout the city after the war, it took 3 years for "Neimar" to obtain the building permit. City asked architect Đorđe Kovaljevski, who was drafting the general plan for entire Belgrade, for his opinion on the plan, and he approved it, even commended it, though he suggested few minor corrections. Still, city rejected the project, saying the general plan wasn't finished. In order to speed up the construction, the company took on itself to construct fences around the blocks, waterworks, sewage system and sidewalks, which was city's obligation, and in the end took city administration to the court. Aware that they are not fulfilling their part of the contract, city acknowledged the plan in 1922.

Though the buyers could use the architects by their own choice, they had to follow the rules set by the original plan of the neighborhood. They could also contract the "Neimar" company, in which case they had a discount. The owners hired most eminent Serbian architects for their villas, including Branko Tanazević, Dragomir Tadić, Milan Zloković, Milutin Borisavljević] and Momir Korunović. As it consisted solely of villas with yards, it took some time for Neimar to fully develop, but by the outbreak of World War II it was deemed one of the most beautiful neighborhoods of Belgrade. It had a direct public transportation bus line to downtown, Knežev spomenik-Neimar.

== Characteristics ==
The inspiration for the design of the neighborhood came from the complex built in 1912 along the Daviel Street in Paris. It consisted of 40 one-floor houses with gardens, indented from the main street. As walkways became larger this way, lawns along the streets were introduced into the urban architecture. This style became very popular across the Europe. A whole string of new neighborhoods like this encircled eastern outskirts of Belgrade, including Neimar, with names usually containing "suburb" and some member of the royal family. These original names either never became popular or were suppressed after World War II and replaced.

Neimar is entirely a residential area. The neighborhood is bounded by some of the most important streets for city's transportation, like the Boulevard of the Liberation (west), South Boulevard and the highway (including the Autokomanda interchange, both south) but itself represents a web of short, narrow streets. Until the 1990s the neighborhood managed to preserve its old architecture (mostly short buildings and family houses with yards), but since then several blocks of modern complexes with higher buildings have been constructed.

There is an elementary school "Svetozar Marković" in the neighborhood. Founded in 1950 as the "10th Eight-grade School", it was renamed in 1951. The school had no permanent building until the present edifice was built specifically for this purpose, and opened on 20 October 1954.

A fragmented section of the Mačvanska Street was renamed Mome Kapora Street, in honor of author, painter and Belgrade chronicler Momo Kapor. A small square which connects two parts of the former street, and the third, Tamnavska Street, was adapted into the Plateau of Momo Kapor. The granite-cobbled square was opened on 28. December 2016, and serves as an outdoor cultural stage.

In the central area of the neighborhood there is a park. Formerly known as Neimar Park, it is today officially named Park of Jelena Šantić. It covers 0.59 hectares (1.5 acres).

In 2019, Branislav Mitrović, architect and member of the Serbian Academy of Sciences and Arts, said that "caricatural architecture, inept compilations and stylish nonsenses" turned once respectable residential neighborhood of Neimar, so as Senjak and Dedinje, into chaos.

At some point, the neighborhood was placed under the preliminary legal protection. This protection expired in December 2020, and the vacuum in the protection was used by some investors who rushed to purchase lots with villas and obtain building permits. Citizens' groups pushed for the full protection of the entire Neimar slope of the Vračar hill, under the name of Kotež Neimar. In April 2021 it was announced that, by June, city's Institute for the Cultural Monuments Protection will decide whether Neimar will be proclaimed a cultural monument. This didn't happen, and demolition of old villas continued, either without permits with inspections halting works when demolition is already finished, speedy demolishing them in only couple of hours, or even tearing down houses which are in the process of protection evaluation.

== Administration ==
When Belgrade was administratively divided into the municipalities in 1952, Neimar became one of the city's municipalities, with the population of 28,885 by the 1953 census. On 1 January 1957 it merged with the municipality of Istočni Vračar and part of the municipality of Terazije to create the modern municipality of Vračar. Later, Neimar was organized as a local community (mesna zajednica), a sub-municipal unit within Vračar.

The local community of Neimar existed until the late 2000s, when the municipality of Vračar abolished local communities. In the 1990s, adjoining local community of France Rozman was annexed to Neimar. Population of Neimar in that period was 8,205 (14,493 with France Rozman) in 1981, 7,186 (12,800) in 1991 and 12,058 in 2002.

== Novi Neimar ==
The "Neimar" company in the early 1930s also drafted the plan for the modern urbanization of the right bank of the Čuburski Potok. This proposed neighborhood, spreading between the modern Južni Bulevar and Gospodara Vučića was named Novi Neimar (New Neimar). It was envisioned similarly like Neimar itself, as the suburban garden city, or garden quarter. The project wasn't realized. Old, small houses were mostly replaced by the highrise along the Južni Bulevar since World War II.

The neighborhood, which makes the southernmost section of the Vračar municipality today, was organized as the local community of Franc Rozman with the population of 6,288 in 1981 and 5,614 in 1991, before it was administratively annexed to Neimar.

== Cathedral of the Assumption of Mary ==
The street of Hadži Milentijava in Neimar is the location of the Cathedral of the Blessed Virgin Mary. A group of French business people settled in the area in the early 1920s. Their children were taught by the Assumptionist nuns and the monks built the church in 1924-1925, which was colloquially called the "French church" by the local population. The church was consecrated by Angelo Roncalli, at the time Holy See's apostolic visitor to Bulgaria, and the future pope John XXIII. In 1930, the monumental belfry was erected, consisting of three bells: the largest was donation of the king Alexander I of Yugoslavia, middle one was sent from the Vatican and the smallest one was purchased from the donation of the adherents. In 1938 the Assumptionists began building a new church, envisioned as the memorial church for the French and Serbian soldiers killed in the World War I, with the addition of the clergy house and the monastery. The church was designed by architect Branislav Marinković.

Due to the outbreak of the World War II, the new church remained unfinished with only the walls of the building and first levels of belfry being finished. After the war new Communist authorities basically commandeered it. It was used as the storage unit for the factories but, due to the good acoustics, it was used by the Radio Belgrade for taping the music shows. Facing the diminished interest among the younger generations to serve in the church, the Assumptionists left in 1982. Catholics took over the church and after almost 50 years continued the construction of the church in 1987. The new church was consecrated and declared a cathedral of the Roman Catholic Archdiocese of Belgrade in 1988. The monastery and the adjoining auxiliary edifices were transformed into the Home of the Saint John of Capistrano. New monumental pipe organ was installed in 2000. Since 2001, the cathedral hosts an annual international music festival "Days of pipe organ - Dies organorum".

The interior of the new church was painted in the mixed Catholic-Orthodox manner, sometimes described as the result of the "picturesque illustration of the confusing encounter of the East and West in Belgrade". Virgin Mary was presented in both traditions, in the Orthodox one in the lower section and in the Western Marian iconography in the upper section. She is surrounded by both the Catholic and Orthodox saints, including the father of the Serbian church, Saint Sava. Remaining from the French Assumptionists, there is a Gallic rooster on the cross above the old belfry. Saint John of Capistrano, whose name bears the monastery, was chosen because of his participation in the successful defense of the city during the 1456 Siege of Belgrade. He personally commanded the detachment consisting of the Crusaders and strongly pushed for the all-European Crusade against the Ottoman Turks.

The entire complex is known as the Marijanum. As it was actually never fully completed, a massive reconstruction, including the completion of the complex, will started in June 2019. Opening of the new pastoral center marked the completion of the works on 10 September 2022. The first such venue in Archdiocese of Belgrade, it was named after Pope John the Good. Bel tower was embellished with the large mosaic representing Transfiguration of Jesus on the mount. The theme was chosen as Pope Callixtus III selected it as the feast of the monastery after the 1456 defeat of the Ottomans. The mosaic, work of Marko Rupnik, also depicts Pope Sixtus III and John of Capistrano. Dormitory for guests was also finished, so as four stained glasses on the bel tower, while the bronze statue of Pope John XXIII, sculptured by Dragan Radenović, was erected in the inner yard.
