= Drinka Radovanović =

Serbian sculptor (1943–2022)

Drinka Radovanović (1943-2022) was a Serbian sculptor. She was a student of the famed Serbian sculptor Matija Vuković.

== Works ==
Radovanović has created many statues of national heroes, including a monument to Karađorđe Petrović at Marićević Trench, which was erected in 2004 to commemorate the bicentennial of the First Serbian Uprising.
