= Cvetni trg =

Cvetni trg Цветни трг
- Urban neighborhood
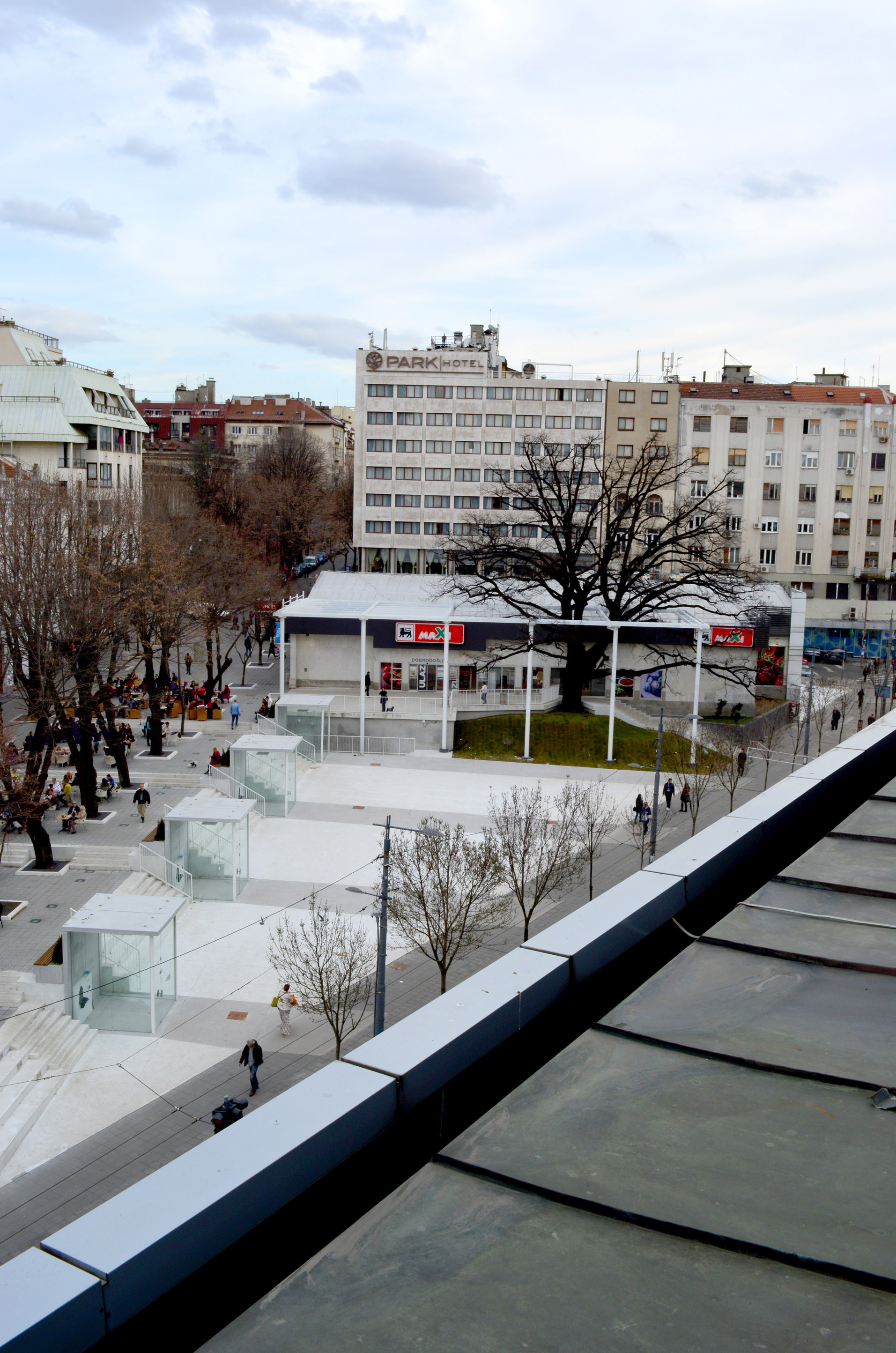
- Cvetni Trg in winter

- Location within Belgrade
- Coordinates: 44°48′21.3″N 20°27′54.2″E
- Country: Serbia
- Region: Belgrade
- Municipality: Vračar
- Time zone: UTC+1 (CET)
  - Summer (DST): UTC+2 (CEST)
- Area code: +381(0)11
- Car plates: BG

Cvetni trg or Flower Square (Serbian Cyrillic: Цветни трг) is an urban neighborhood of Belgrade, the capital of Serbia. It is located in the Belgrade municipality of Vračar.

== Location ==
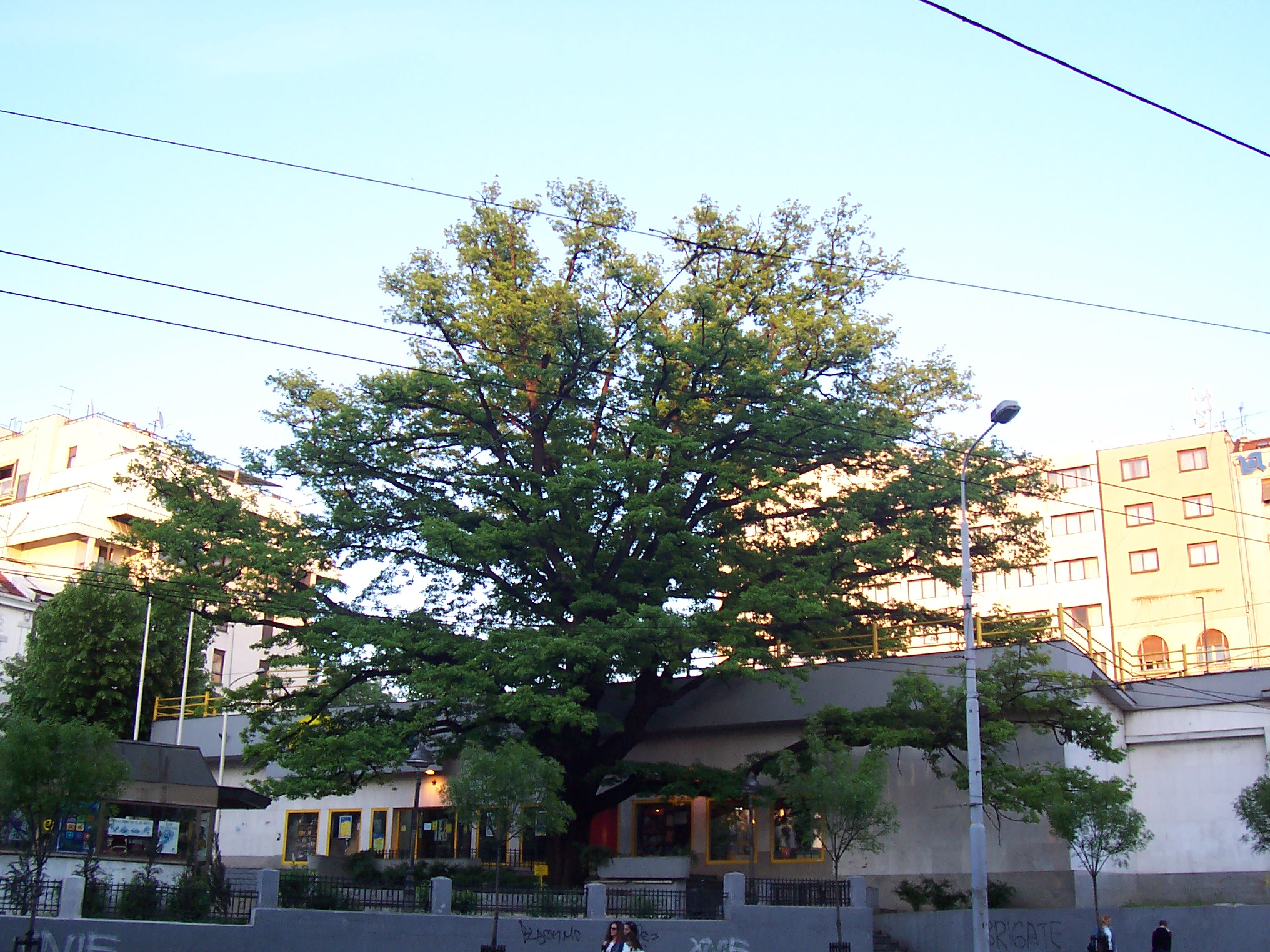
Pedunculate Oak at the square in 2005

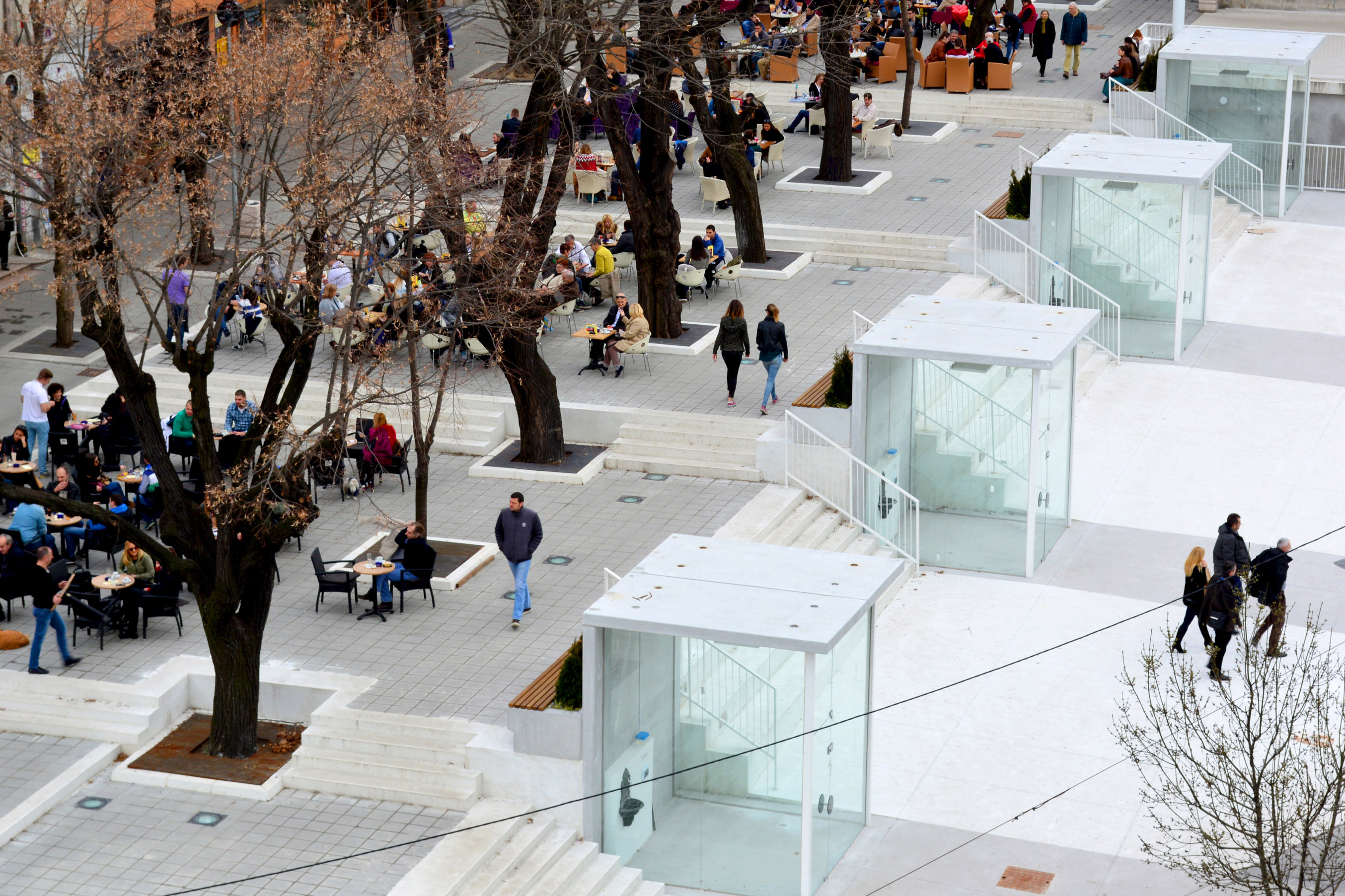
View from the Njegoševa street

Cvetni trg is a small, triangularly shaped neighborhood in what was once the central part of the previously large neighborhood of Vračar. In terms of modern administrative division, it is located in the western part of the municipality of Vračar, on one of Belgrade's main streets of Kralja Milana and the border of the municipality of Savski Venac. Other two streets that mark the borders of the neighborhood are Njegoševa and Svetozara Markovića, but the term generally comprises a few adjoining blocks to the north and east, making a local community of Cvetni Trg, which existed until the late 2000s, when the municipality of Vračar abolished local communities. In the 1990s, the adjoining local communities of Slavija, Nada Purić and Kalenić was annexed to Cvetni Trg. Population of Cvetni Trg in that period was 9,308 (31,410 with other three local communities) in 1981, 8,664 (28,641) in 1991 and 25,759 in 2002. Cvetni Trg is located right across the Yugoslav drama theater and Manjež park.

== History ==
The area of Cvetni trg was one of the Vračar areas covered in vast forests of oak and ash trees. The forest was cut down a long time ago to make place for an urban development (small open greenmarket and future supermarket) with only one tree surviving today. A 30 metres (98 ft) tall pedunculate oak (Serbian: hrast lužnjak) with a crown diameter of 18 metres (59 ft), it is one of the three oldest trees on the territory of Belgrade, after two oaks in the village of Šiljakovac. In 2013 it was estimated to be 200 years old. In November 2013 the tree's roots were protected with the concrete casing an it has been concluded that it is healthy and in the good shape. Dried branches are regularly removed and the cuts are covered with the protective coatings. To keep them safe, the largest branches are supported by the metallic cables. Estimates in the early 2020s placed the planting of the tree between 1804 and 1811. Since 2001 it has been protected by the state as the natural monument. Apart from the cables, placed in 2006, during the 2015 reconstruction of the square, the metal poles were placed around it, which hold the square construction in the lower crown. Also, the concrete casing around the root was removed, and the grass was planted around the tree.

Greenmarket was opened in 1884, and by the end of the century streets around it got sidewalks and avenues. Cvetni trg was named after the many flower shops located there, which lasted until the early 2000s (decade) when most of them were closed. The dominant feature of the neighborhood since 28 April 1958 has been the first and, at that time, largest modern supermarket in the Balkans, the first one with shelves and baskets (even before Vienna). Used to the small stores, in the beginning the customers couldn't manage themselves in the supermarket so the helpers were employed to give the baskets to the customers, help them move around and explain that they can't take baskets home with them. Novelties included packed meat, coffee in bags and free paper bags for the groceries. The cashiers were paid by the company to visit hairdressers every week. As a curiosity, it was the first store to sell Coca-Cola cans in this part of the world. Since 1960 it has become part of Serbia's largest store chain, Centroprom, and for decades remained Belgrade's supermarket with the highest revenues. It was renovated in 1990, and given a modern, marble appearance. However, as C-market (the successor of Centroprom) was bought by the Delta Holding system, the supermarket was closed on 1 November 2006 and the thorough reconstruction began to change its purpose from a grocery market to the BMW car salon which was to be opened on 7 February 2007. Car salon was closed and the supermarket returned on 7 May 2009 (branded Maxi Exclusive).

Since the early 1900s there were ideas of erecting a monument to Petar II Petrović Njegoš. During the Interbellum several boards for erection of the monument were formed, which included some of the culture's most prominent people like Branislav Nušić or Ivo Andrić, and the Royal Karađorđević dynasty even donated money, but due to the disagreements of the convenient location, the monument wasn't built. After World War II, the task of carving the monument was given to Sreten Stojanović who finished it in 1952 and garnered numerous praises. Serbian government decided to place it on Cvetni Trg, but the city government, supported by the public stalled the process as on this location, the monument to such an important person would be placed next to the public toilet. During this delay, Montenegrin government reacted and placed the monument in Titograd. On 22 June 1989 city assembly decided to place the replica of Stojanović's work in Belgrade, but on another location, on the Faculty of Philosophy Plateau, where the monument was dedicated on 29 June 1994.

According to the city's general urban plan (GUP) in the 1960s, Cvetni Trg was envisioned as the location of the future central underground subway station of Belgrade, which would also replace the Belgrade Main railway station. The tunnels would conduct the traffic in the north to south direction. The railroad authorities opposed the project, so the plans were abandoned.

In the early 2000s (decade), the section of Njegoševa street north of Cvetni trg was closed for traffic, paved with stone and turned into a series of small stair-like plateaus, used as patios for local coffee shops, thus enlarging the area of the square.

== 2015 reconstruction ==
Despite previous recent works, after 2013, new city government headed by mayor Siniša Mali decided to do another reconstruction. As soon as the project, headed by architect Ksenija Bulatović, was chosen, both professional and public opinion were already against it. Nevertheless, city government pushed the project and the new square was officially opened on 16 December 2015. The small square which gave a feel of being cosy and tucked in, was completely buried under the white concrete. It was soon nicknamed the “Concrete square”, and seen as a sickly white, empty, sterile and resembling a great tomb or a columbarium. It was soon evident that, apart from being completely botched, it was poorly done and that it may need new reconstruction soon. As the public discontent didn’t stop, Bulatović authored a text in Politika, titled Emptiness is an event, trying to explain her work and saying that the "basic quality of an urban area is reaction of the human senses" and that it is important "whether some area is pleasant or desirable to spend time in it". Preachy and philosophical text only provoked the public opinion even more, and she got a harsh public response from composer Ivana Stefanović titled Great white emptiness replying that the "event" actually makes you feel negative and unpleasant spending time in it and that the spirit of Cvetni trg, that of the small city garden, was killed and replaced by the graveyard silence. Dramaturge and university professor Predrag Perišić said that someone "ripped out the flowers and planted concrete" and that "it is a rare case that one urban complex, after the reconstruction and lots of resources spent on it, looks worse than before, while architect Slobodan Maldini said that the square has been "degraded". Architect Zdravko Zdravković criticized the city government in general for hiring only the architects of the same mind, ignoring all the other professions which participate in the urban development. He added that after the reconstruction Cvetni Trg completely lost its function and was transformed into the "barren, empty space", but that "failures, luckily, can be repaired". Despite the public outcry, mayor Mali, who publicly said that he can’t draw even a stick figure, said that the new square is “probably the most beautiful in Belgrade”. The total reshaped area covered 2,000 m^{2} (22,000 sq ft).

A monument to one of the greatest Serbian writers, Borislav Pekić, in a sitting position, was uncovered at the stairs of the square on 2 March 2016.

In April 2018 it was announced that the fountain will be built in the ground-level section of the square. The small, cascade-shaped fountain, work of Željko Milović, will cover 90 m^{2} (970 sq ft). Bulatović explained that "the composition of the fountain represents the visual experience of the computerized times in which we live and a binary system which surrounds us". After numerous delays, the fountain became operational on 30 April 2021. In the end, the small complex which includes plateau with vertical jet springs in several rows, few small, shallow pools and several marble squares, covered 40 square metres (430 sq ft). There is inscription "To the eternal beauty of Belgrade" on the fountain. On the same day it was opened, the fountain broke so the water overflew over the square. Residents disliked the fountain, noting that the square's cemetery resemblance was even enhanced.

== See also ==
- List of individual trees
