= East Vračar =

Former municipality in Serbia

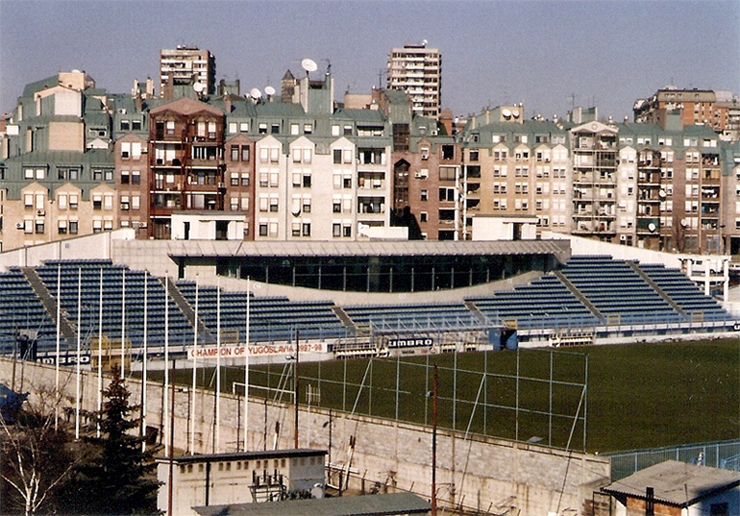
FK Obilić stadium in East Vračar

East Vračar or Istočni Vračar (Serbian Cyrillic: Источни Врачар) is a former urban neighborhood and municipality of Belgrade, the capital of Serbia. It was located in Belgrade's municipality of Vračar to which it generally corresponds today. In 1952, the region was split into East Vračar and Neimar. The patron saint of East Vračar is Saint Sava.
