= Church of Saint Sava =

Church in Belgrade, Serbia

- Храм Светог Саве; Hram Svetog Save
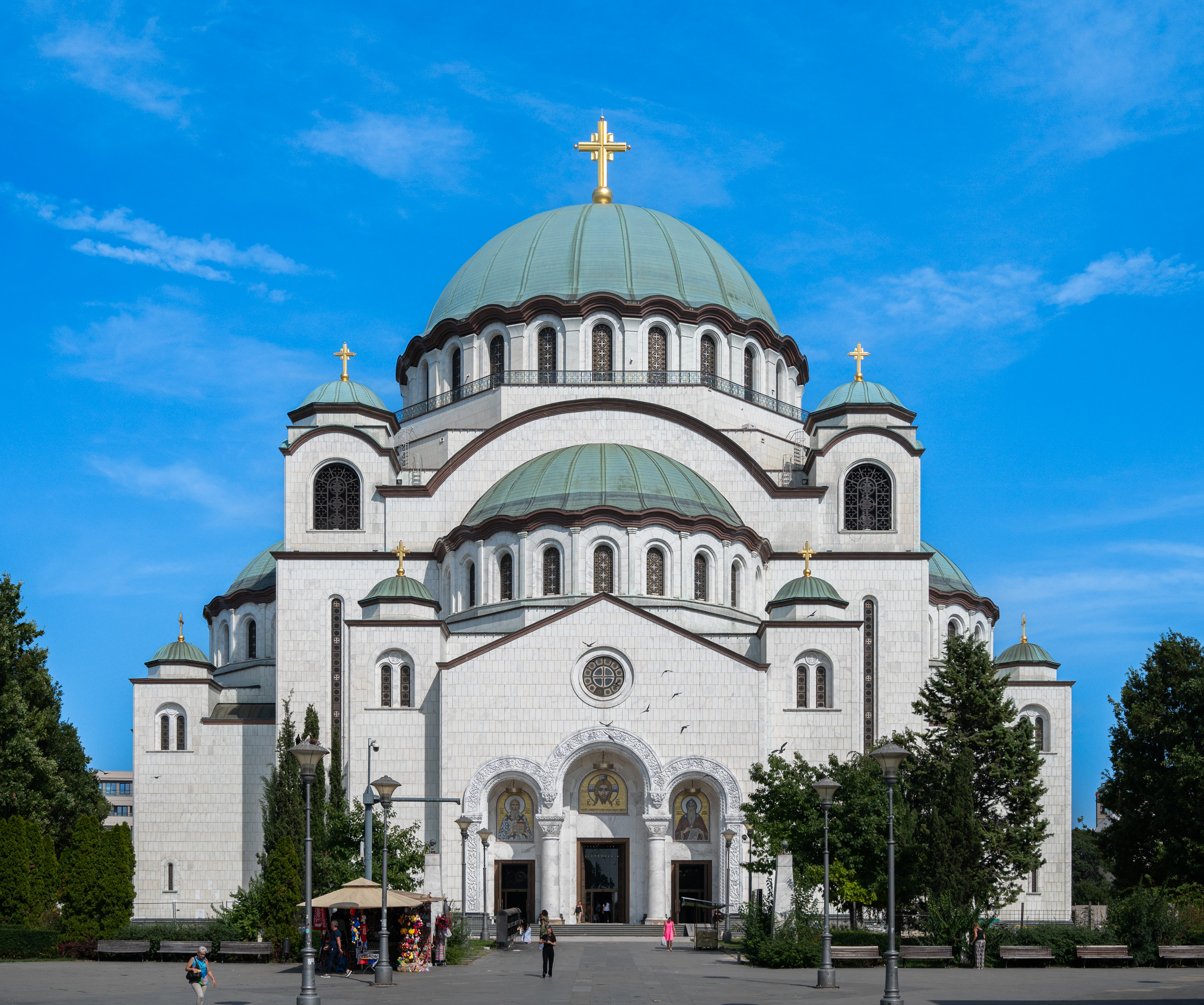
- Church of Saint Sava, pictured in 2023
- Church of Saint Sava
- 44°47′53″N 20°28′6.74″E
- Location: Krušedolska 2a, Vračar, Belgrade
- Country: Serbia
- Denomination: Eastern Orthodox
- Website: hramsvetogsave.rs

History
- Dedicated: Saint Sava
- Consecrated: 10 May 2004

Architecture
- Architect(s): Aleksandar Deroko; Bogdan Nestorović; Branko Pešić
- Style: Neo-Byzantine
- Groundbreaking: 15 September 1935
- Completed: 2020

Specifications
- Capacity: 7,000 (Note: The church’s official site states that the nave floor can accommodate 7,000 worshippers – 6,300 on the nave floor itself and an additional 700 in the choir galleries (balconies). The underground galleries can accommodate a further 3,000 worshippers. The same source also states that the church can accommodate a total of 10,000 worshippers on the nave floor and in the underground galleries. The figure referring to the nave floor alone appears to represent the standard capacity calculation, excluding annexes. By contrast, the total figure of 10,000 may be disputed, as it appears to include annex spaces in order to increase the overall capacity estimate.)
- Length: 91 m
- Width: 81 m
- Height: 78.3 m (top cross) (Note: Nave floor-top cross: 77.34 m; stairs: 0.96 m); 68.5 m (top dome); 64.8 m (dome ceiling)

The Church of Saint Sava (Serbian: Храм Светог Саве, romanized: Hram Svetog Save, lit. ''The Temple of Saint Sava'') is a Serbian Orthodox church in Belgrade, capital of Serbia. It is the fourth largest Eastern Orthodox church in the world and one of the largest churches in the world by gross volume.

The church is dedicated to Saint Sava, the first Serbian archbishop and the nation's patron saint. It was symbolically built on the site where his relics are believed to have been burned on a pyre by the Ottomans in 1594 following a Serb uprising. Construction of the church began in 1935 and was completed only in 2004, when the exterior was finished, and in 2020, when work on the interior was completed, following decades of interrupted construction, wars, and political turmoil.

Inspired by the Hagia Sophia, the Church of Saint Sava is one of Belgrade’s most recognizable landmarks and a tourist attraction.

== History ==
=== Background ===
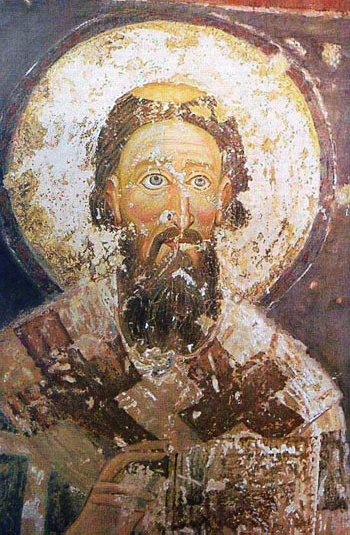
Fresco of Saint Sava in the Mileševa Monastery, 1235

Saint Sava (1175–1235), the patron saint of Serbia and the Serbs, was born as Rastko, a Serbian prince and the son of Stefan Nemanja (r. 1166–1196). Rastko took monastic vows under the name Sava and was later joined by his father, who became the monk Simeon, at Mount Athos, an important center of Eastern Orthodox monasticism, where the Byzantine emperor granted them Hilandar. Sava returned to Serbia after Simeon's death and organized the Serbian Church, and was later consecrated as the first Serbian Archbishop. Sava died in 1236 and was later canonized.

In 1594, Serbs rose up against Ottoman rule in Banat, during the Long Turkish War which was fought at the Austrian-Ottoman border in the Balkans. The Serbian patriarchate and rebels had established relations with foreign states, and had captured several towns, although the uprising was quickly suppressed. The rebels had, in the character of a holy war, carried war flags with the icon of Saint Sava. Ottoman Grand vizier Sinan Pasha ordered that the sarcophagus and relics of Saint Sava at the Mileševa Monastery be brought by military convoy to Belgrade. As a form of retaliation against the rebels, the Ottomans publicly burned the relics on a pyre on 27 April 1595. Although the exact location of this event is disputed it is thought to be on the Vračar plateau.

=== Planning and design ===
On the 300th anniversary of the burning of Saint Sava's relics in 1894, an initiative was launched to build a church dedicated to Saint Sava, leading to the establishment of the Society for the Construction of the Church of Saint Sava on Vračar the following year. The search for a site provoked debate as the exact location of the burning remained disputed. Presumed locations included Crveni Krst, suggested by Gligorije Vozarović who erected Vozarev Cross at the spot; Tašmajdan, which is the prevailing view in modern historiography; and the Vračar plateau, which enjoyed the widest public support at the time and was ultimately selected as the site. Most of the land donated for the construction was provided by Francis Mackenzie, a Scottish missionary credited with acquiring and developing this area of the city. By the 1900 decree of King Alexander I, the planned church was declared a "national edifice". Initially a small church was constructed and the search began to find an adequate design.

In 1906, an architectural design competition for the future church was announced. Imperial Saint Petersburg Academy of Sciences, authorized to select the winning design, rejected all five applications as insufficient. Meanwhile, there was a public debate over the project, with Croatian sculptor Ivan Meštrović proposing the building of a Yugoslavist "Vidovdan Temple" at Gazimestan in 1905 instead, a scale model which was exhibited at Serbia's pavilion at the 1911 International Exhibition of Art and the full-scale model exhibited in London in 1915. The Balkan Wars and World War I stopped all construction activities. After the war, in 1919, the Society for the Construction of the Church of Saint Sava on Vračar was re-established and the idea for the memorial church transformed into a more ambitious project.

Another architectural design competition was announced in 1926 with the design guidelines stating that the church should be the "greatest and most monumental building in the country, and have ultimate artistic importance". Beside the church itself, the project was to include buildings for the Patriarchate, Eastern Orthodox Seminary, and the Ministry of Religion. The church design was to be in the style of the Serbo-Byzantine architecture of the 14th century. The Patriarch Dimitrije, on the other hand, envisioned a church built in the late Byzantine "Morava style", with an area of 3,000 sq m, a tower of 80 m, offering space to 6,000 faithful. Dimitrije favoured Serbian and Russian graduates of the Vienna Academy of Arts which figured prominently in the 1926–27 competition. The 1926–27 competition saw entries from major architects in the country; besides Bogdan Nestorović and Aleksandar Deroko, entries came from Dragiša Brašovan, Milan Zloković, Milutin Borisavljević, Branko Krstić, Petar Krstić, Žarko Tatić, Aleksej Papkov, Miladin Prljević, among others. The architectural design selection committee included Patriarch Dimitrije, Jovan Cvijić, Andra Stevanović, Bogdan Popović, Pera Popović, and Momir Korunović. The committee declined to select a winner, criticizing quality of the entries as none of them met the tender criteria. Most proposed designs were based on models of the Gračanica Monastery as the main representative of Serbian medieval architecture. It is believed that the Jury had recommended the two models.

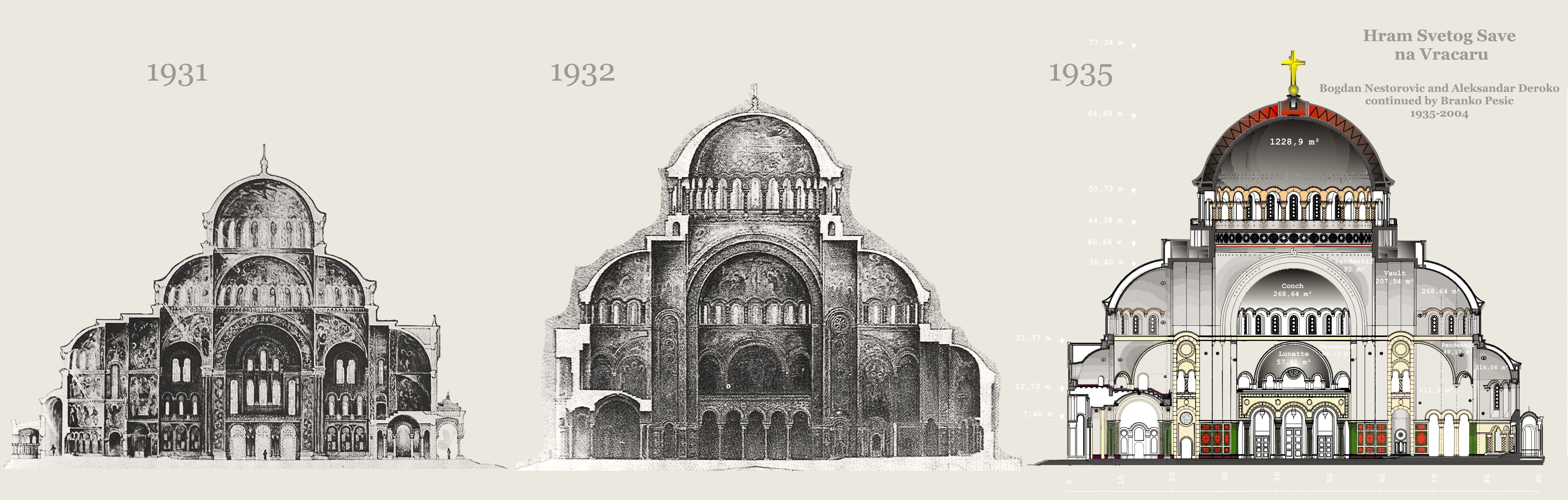
Evolution of the church’s design from 1931 to 1935

With no declared winner, the project remained dormant until the "Society for the Construction of the Church of Saint Sava on Vračar" asked the University of Belgrade Faculty of Architecture in 1930 to delegate "two specialists" to join the Society and Nestorović (awarded 2nd place) in further elaborating his design. The faculty proposed Dragutin Ðorđević and Aleksandar Deroko, with Deroko subsequently joining Nestorović in the project. The new sketches resembled Hagia Sophia and not the Morava style or Gračanica Monastery as previously. The Society under charimanship of Patriarch Varnava had chosen Hagia Sophia as the new basis for design. There were some debates regarding the project before and during this planning stage, with complaints that such an immense monument should be Yugoslav in nature, given the fact that the cult of Saint Sava was a largely Serb heritage. During the debate, some even pushed for the construction of the "Vidovdan Temple" instead. Especially vocal was art historian Kosta Strajnić, whose supporters opted for the "Yugoslav, not Serbian Pantheon". They also rejected the Byzantine design, as it only symbolized Serbs and not the Croats and Slovenes, as the other two "tribes" of one Yugoslav nation. Meštrović supported Strajnić, insisting that the new "Yugoslav style" should be created, instead of the religious architecture that would fit only one of the denominations. King Alexander I Karađorđević publicly didn't support any solution, but privately pushed for Meštrović's temple, as he was a major proponent of Yugoslavism and Meštrović, as the most important Yugoslavist artist at the time, was his favorite.

As they developed the project, Nestorović and Deroko reflected the growing enthusiasm of one part of the population that wanted Belgrade to have one of the largest Eastern Orthodox churches in the world. The size, height and weight of the dome were meant to exceed that of Hagia Sophia. From the initially planned 60x60m, the church had grown to 80x90m. The enlarged diameter of the dome was to compete with the great domed cathedrals of late antiquity, renaissance, baroque, and historicism. Thus, the Hagia Sophia was the only reference for the synthetic redraft of the Nestorović–Deroko design, as it features a dome with an initial diameter of 33 m.

=== Construction ===
Forty years after the initial idea, construction of the church began on 10 May 1935, based on the design of Aleksandar Deroko and Bogdan Nestorović, with the assistance of civil engineer Vojislav Zađina. The cornerstone was laid by Metropolitan Gavrilo Dožić of Montenegro and the Littoral, future Patriarch Gavrilo V.

Construction continued until the Axis invasion of Yugoslavia in 1941, by which point the foundation had been completed and the walls had been raised to heights of 7 and 11 meters. The occupying German army used the unfinished church as a parking lot, while in 1944 the Red Army, and later the Yugoslav People's Army, used it for the same purpose. It was subsequently used as a storage site by various construction companies. The granite slabs, intended for the construction of the church, were used for the building of the Tomb of People's Heroes in 1948, in the Kalemegdan Park.

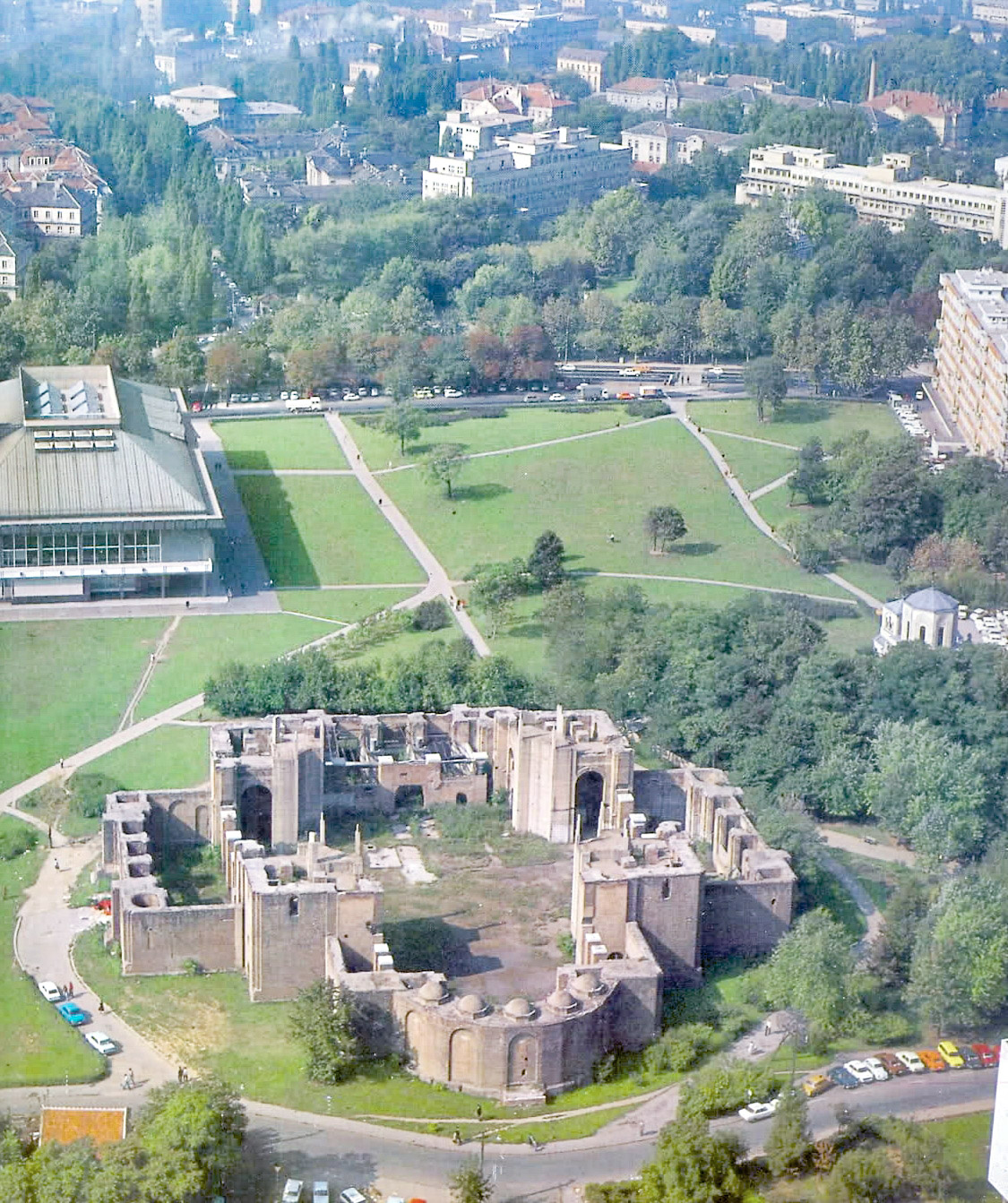
The abandoned construction site, mid-1970s

After the end of World War II, the construction site was closed due to the changing political situation and the dominant Communist ideology in the Socialist Yugoslavia. The Communist authorities identified as atheists and rejected the Serbian Orthodox Church's request to continue construction. The unfinished structure was instead used as a playground, and even various circus troupes made use of it. Patriarch German personally championed the project, and during his tenure one of his main concerns was the resumption of construction. For several decades, he submitted 88 requests to various government agencies, all of which were rejected.

In 1966, the Executive Council of the Socialist Republic of Serbia persuaded the Serbian Orthodox Church to agree to roof the foundation walls and convert them into a museum dedicated to Saint Sava or a gallery of frescoes. The Church later withdrew its consent and continued to demand the resumption of construction. Permission was finally granted in 1984 by Dušan Čkrebić, then President of the Presidency of the Socialist Republic of Serbia, who made use of a legal loophole: the original ban had been issued as a political stance by the Communist Party leadership, but it had never been formally enacted by any state body or published in the Official Gazette. Therefore, no formal repeal or new legislation was required. This decision was widely reported by media and became a public sensation. On 12 May 1985, thousands of people gathered to celebrate with the Serbian Patriarch and bishops a liturgy inside the walls of unfinished church.

Architect Branko Pešić was selected as the new architect and he revised the original design by Deroko and Nestorović in order to make better use of new materials and building techniques. Construction resumed on 12 August 1985. The original design project proposed a structure composed of masonry and partly reinforced concrete. The four central bell towers were founded on 532 "Simplex" piles, 6 meters in depth. The massive perimeter walls rest on strip foundations 4 metres deep. The various materials used (brick, concrete, reinforcement, marble, etc.) were quality-checked. A detailed survey of the existing structure was conducted, and the as-built outlines were determined and served as a starting point for further design and construction work. The original base-level design of brick and concrete was cancelled. These lower levels were preserved with the foundation structure, which had to be repaired. The four-wing section had to be separated from the central part by way of expansion joints, between the semi-domes and the main arches, and vertically down the bell towers up to the foundations. Reinforced concrete columns and tie-beams tied up the foundations and future structures. With new materials and design methods, the weight was reduced by 30 to 40%. While the initial foundations were only 6 m deep, the new ones, with a diameter of 1.4 m, reached a depth of 17 m and extended to solid rock.

The continued construction was designed as a fully prefabricated reinforced concrete structure. Due to the geometrically complex form and its structural requirements, individual elements had to be broken down into precast components defined, to the greatest possible extent, by straight lines. The walls were designed as hollow boxes, which, when assembled, give the building its massive appearance. All arched forms of the galleries and vaults were transformed into assemblies of elements curved in two dimensions, which, once erected, formed three-dimensional shapes. The semi-domes and the main dome were linearized through a system of arched trusses and two layers of curved decking. The precast parts were tied into a unified whole by in-situ cast concrete elements, which provided the required structural safety and longevity. The bell towers were initially constructed as a combination of brick and concrete columns and were later continued as concrete box structures to ensure maximum resistance and minimal weight. This part of the building was completed using the slip-form (sliding shuttering) method, which offers the advantages of continuous casting.

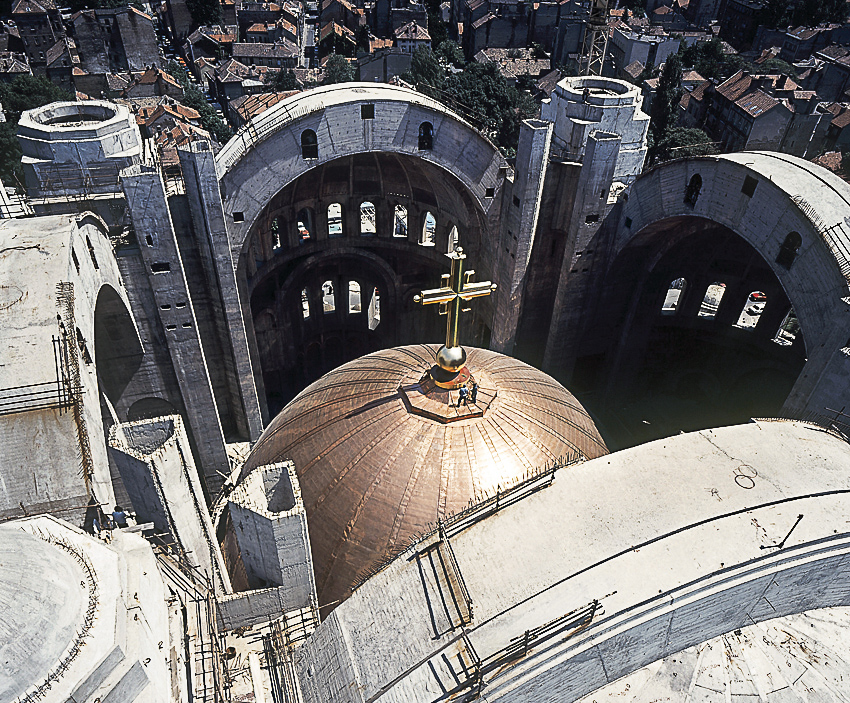
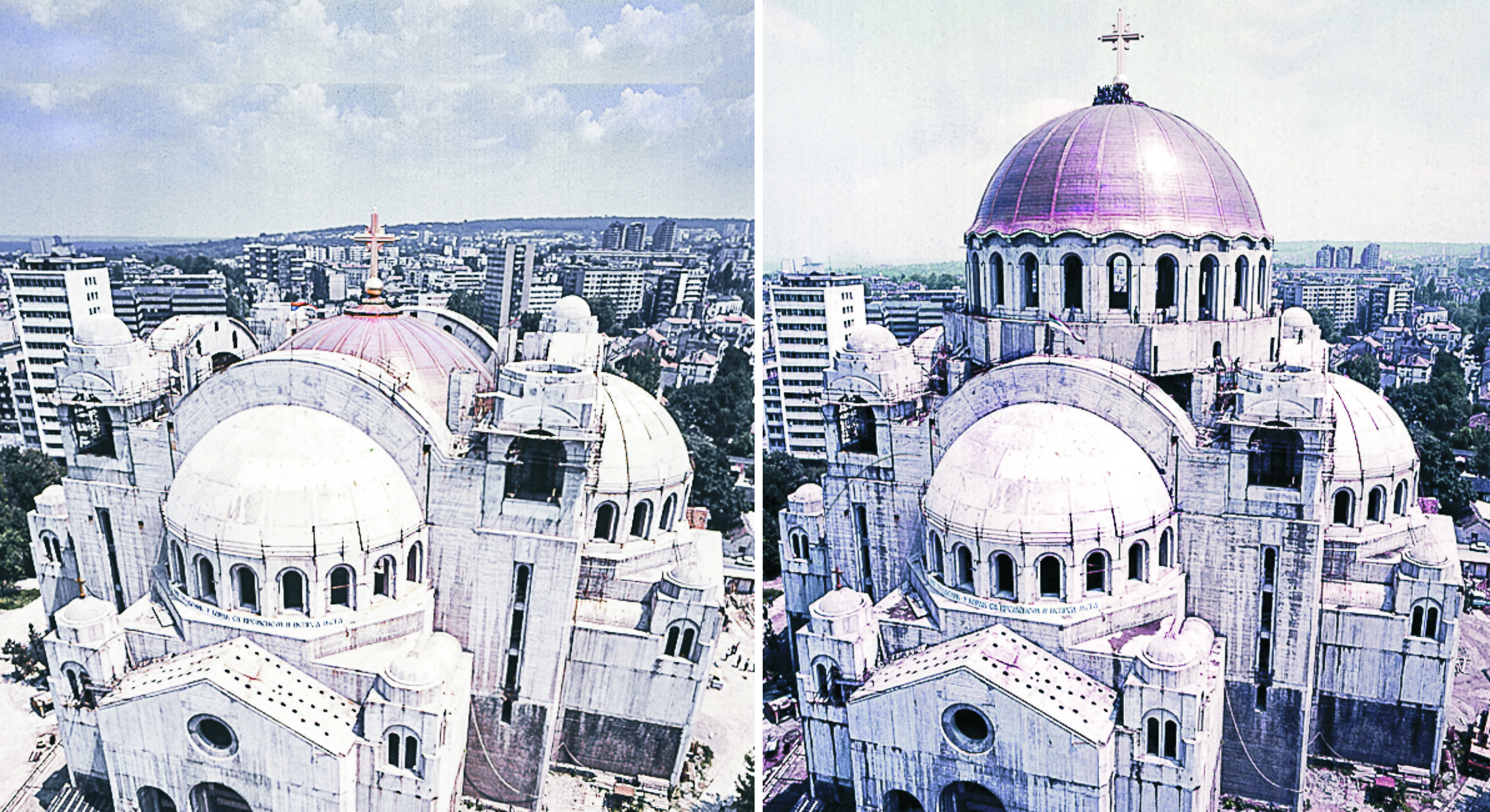
Lifting of the 4,000-ton central dome by lift-slab method

The greatest achievement of the construction process was the lifting of the 4,000-ton central dome, which had been built on the ground together with the copper plate and the cross, and was later lifted onto the vaulted arches. It took 20 days using specially constructed hydraulic machines and was completed on 26 June 1989, symbolically two days before the commemoration of the 600th anniversary of the Battle of Kosovo. After the lifting of the dome, the pendentive was assembled at ground level beneath the main dome and then lifted again by hydraulic machines. With this work, the structural part of the church was completed.

The works were halted again during the 1990s as a consequence of the breakup of Yugoslavia, the subsequent Yugoslav Wars, and the economic collapse caused by international sanctions against Serbia.

Construction resumed in the early 2000s, and the exterior, including the façade and the installation of bells, was completed by 2004.

Work on the church's interior began in 2016 with the installation of mosaics and was completed in 2020.

Approximately 100 million euros were allocated to the construction and decoration of the church, including 40 million for mosaics, 10 million for other interior works, and around 50 million for the exterior construction. Of this sum, 43 million came from Serbian government, 10 million was donated by the Russian government, and the remainder was financed through private donations.

== Architecture ==
=== Exterior ===
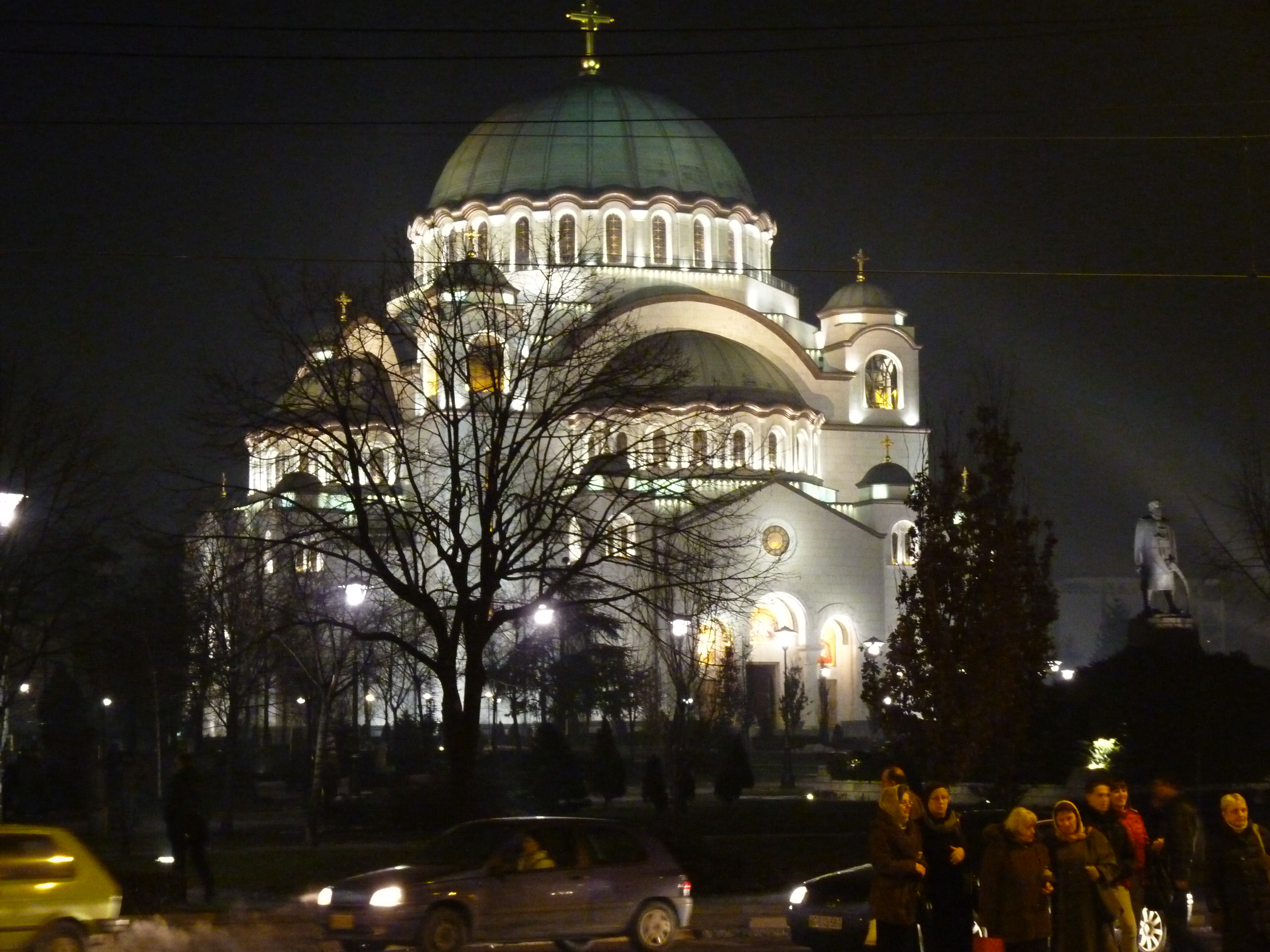
Nightview

The church is a centrally planned edifice in the form of a Greek cross, measuring 91 m (299 ft) from east to west and 81 m (266 ft) from north to south.

The dome of the Church of Saint Sava is a compound dome supported by four pendentives projecting from a sphere of greater radius than the dome itself, and is buttressed on each side by a lower semi-dome above an apse. The double-shelled dome is 27 m high, reaching an external height of 68.5 m (225 ft) and an internal height of 64.8 m, while the main gold-plated Serbian cross is an additional 10 m (33 ft) high and 5 m (16 ft) wide, bringing the total height of the Church of Saint Sava to 78.3 m (257 ft). The dome is the largest of any Eastern Orthodox church, with an inner diameter of 30.5 m (100 ft) and an outer diameter of 35.1 m (115 ft). Among churches of other Christian denominations, only the domes of Florence Cathedral, St. Peter's Basilica, Esztergom Basilica, Berlin Cathedral, and St. Paul's Cathedral have larger inner diameters. Unlike these churches, however, Church of Saint Sava was constructed on four piers with four supporting vaults; the significantly larger dome of St. Peter's Basilica, for example, has main vaults measuring only 23 m in width. In addition to its large diameter, the dome of Saint Sava is the fourth-tallest dome of Eastern Orthodox Christianity, surpassed only by the domes of People's Salvation Cathedral, Cathedral of Christ the Saviour, and Saint Isaac's Cathedral.

The façade, covering an area of 12,000 m^{2} (129,167 sq ft), was primarily executed in polished white Volakas marble from Greece, with approximately 3,000 tonnes of stone used in its construction. The cornices are made of red Balmoral granite from Finland and cover 120 m^{2} (1,292 sq ft) on the dome and semi-domes.

=== Interior ===
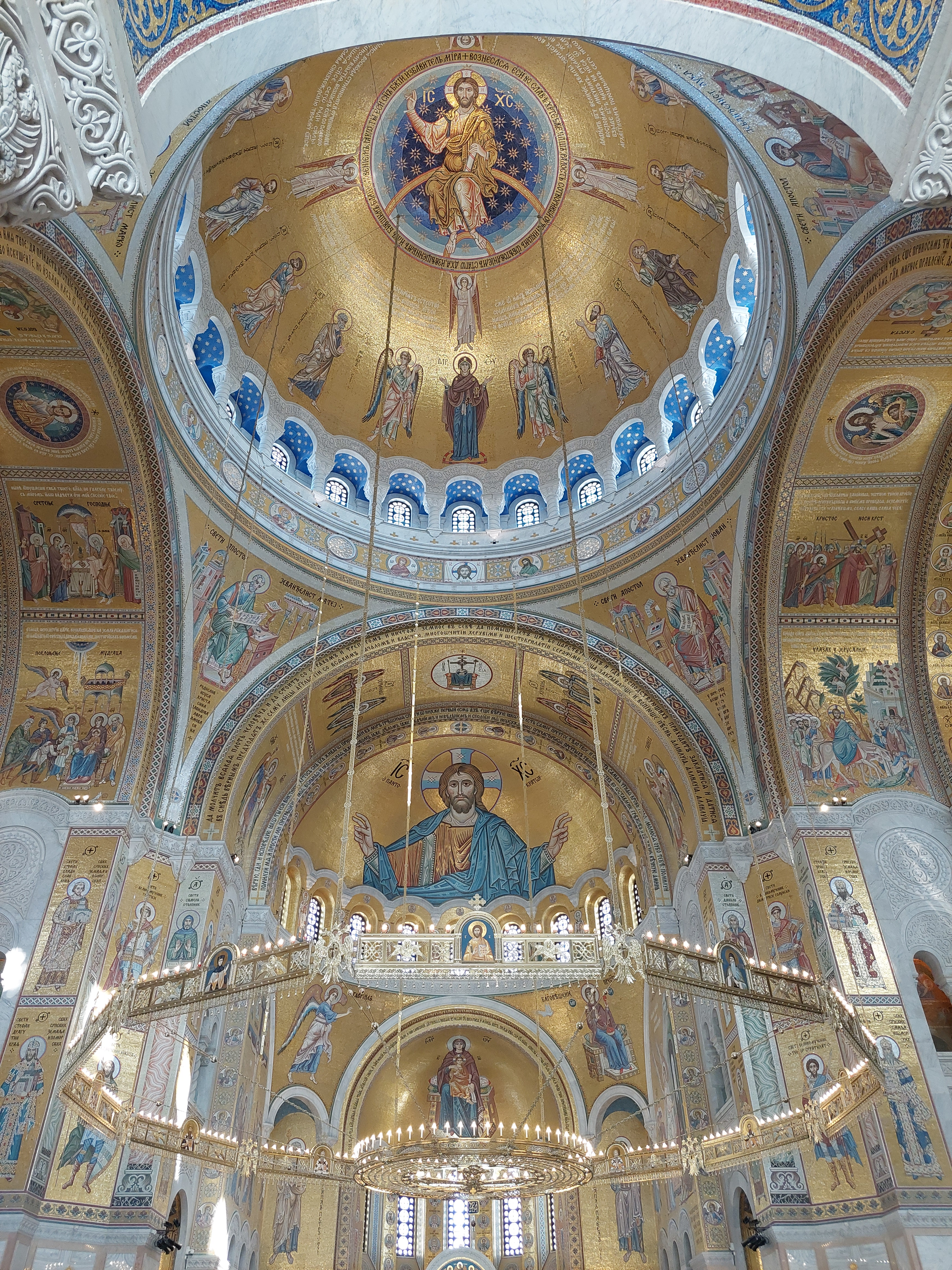
Interior mosaics, among the largest in Christendom

The interior has a surface area of 3,650 m^{2} (39,288 sq ft) on the ground floor, with three galleries covering 1,500 m^{2} (16,146 sq ft) on the first level and a 120 m^{2} (1,292 sq ft) gallery on the second level. The church can accommodate up to 7,000 faithful on the ground floor.

The naos, or main worship space, measures 46 m by 46 m, while the square of the central space beneath the dome is 39.7 m wide and occupies 1,578 m^{2} (16,985 sq ft). The church has narthexes on three sides, two of which are 9 m deep and 31.7 m wide, with small chapels located within the northern and southern narthexes. Galleries supported by arcades are situated above the narthexes and beneath three of the four semi-domes (the semi-dome above the altar does not contain a gallery), while the western gallery serves as the church choir. The basement, with a total surface area of 1,800 m^{2} (19,375 sq ft), contains a crypt, including the Crypt Church of Saint Lazar the Hieromartyr.

The total area of the mosaics covering the interior of the church amounts about 15,000 m^{2} (161,459 sq ft), constituting the largest mosaic surface across the Christendom. The mosaics, containing around 5 million tesseras and designed by Russian iconographer and sculptor Nikolay Mukhin, follow the classical Palaeologan-era tradition of gold mosaics. The central mosaic in the dome, covering an area of 1,230 m^{2} (13,200 sq ft), depicts the Ascension of Jesus and represents Resurrected Christ, sitting on a rainbow and right hand raised in blessing, surrounded by four angels, Apostles and Theotokos. The lower sections are influenced by the Gospel of Luke and the first narratives of the Acts of the Apostles. The artists of the mosaics were chosen from the Moscow School of Painting, Sculpture and Architecture and the Saint Petersburg Repin Academy of Fine Arts.

The main iconostasis is constructed from iron trusses onto which slabs of Carrara marble are installed. The entire structure of the approximately 20 metre-wide iconostasis weighs 100 tonnes. It is decorated with a row of six mosaic icons and contains three doors, while episcopal seats are positioned on both sides of the iconostasis.

Capitals and cornices feature a variety of sculptures covering 1,500 m^{2} (16,146 sq ft). The heraldic symbols of the Nemanjić dynasty are a dominant motif, while floral ornamentation and anthropomorphic figures are inspired by the rich sculptural tradition of the Morava style. The capitals are made of Carrara marble, while the columns are made of green Baveno marble.

The wheel chandelier, one of the largest and heaviest in the world, is the church's main circular lighting fixture, cast in bronze with a diameter of 20 m.

At the northeastern and southeastern pillars, two elevators provide access to the dome galleries. The northern and southern entrance halls contain baptismal fonts, while a third font at gallery level is located on the northern side of the altar.

The church has 49 bells, four of which are free-swinging and located in the southwestern tower. The remaining 45 are part of a carillon, the only one in the Balkans, which regularly performs the Hymn of Saint Sava.

Nr.	Name	Diameter (mm)	Mass (kg)	Note	Belltower
1	Bell of Saint Sava	2,004	6,128	g^{0}	southwestern
2			3,956	a^{0}	southwestern
3			2,458	c^{1}	southwestern
4	Bell of Zoran Đinđić		1,460	d^{2}	southwestern
5			1,054	e^{1}	northwestern
6			894	f^{1}	northwestern
7			744	fis^{1}	northwestern
8			626	g^{1}	northwestern
9			536	gis^{1}	northwestern
10			440	a^{1}	northwestern
11			372	ais^{1}	northwestern
12			312	b^{1}	northwestern
13			260	c^{2}	northwestern
14			219	cis^{2}	northwestern
15			187	d^{2}	northwestern
16			164	dis^{2}	northwestern
17			144	e^{2}	northwestern
18			126	f^{2}	northwestern
19			110	fis^{2}	northwestern
20			96	g^{2}	northwestern
21			85	gis^{2}	northwestern
22			75	a^{2}	northwestern
23			66	ais^{2}	northwestern
24			59	b^{2}	northwestern
25			53	c^{3}	northwestern
26			48	cis^{3}	northwestern
27			44	d^{3}	northwestern
28			40	dis^{3}	northwestern
29			35	e^{3}	northwestern
30			32	f^{3}	northwestern
31			30	fis^{3}	northwestern
32			27	g^{3}	northwestern
33			25	gis^{3}	northwestern
34			25	a^{3}	northwestern
35			21	ais^{3}	northwestern
36			19	b^{3}	northwestern
37			18	c^{4}	northwestern
38			17	cis^{4}	northwestern
39			16	d^{4}	northwestern
40			15	dis^{4}	northwestern
41			15	e^{4}	northwestern
42			14	f^{4}	northwestern
43			14	fis^{4}	northwestern
44			13	g^{4}	northwestern
45			13	gis^{4}	northwestern
46			12	a^{4}	northwestern
47			12	ais^{4}	northwestern
48			12	b^{4}	northwestern
49			11	c^{5}	northwestern

== Site ==
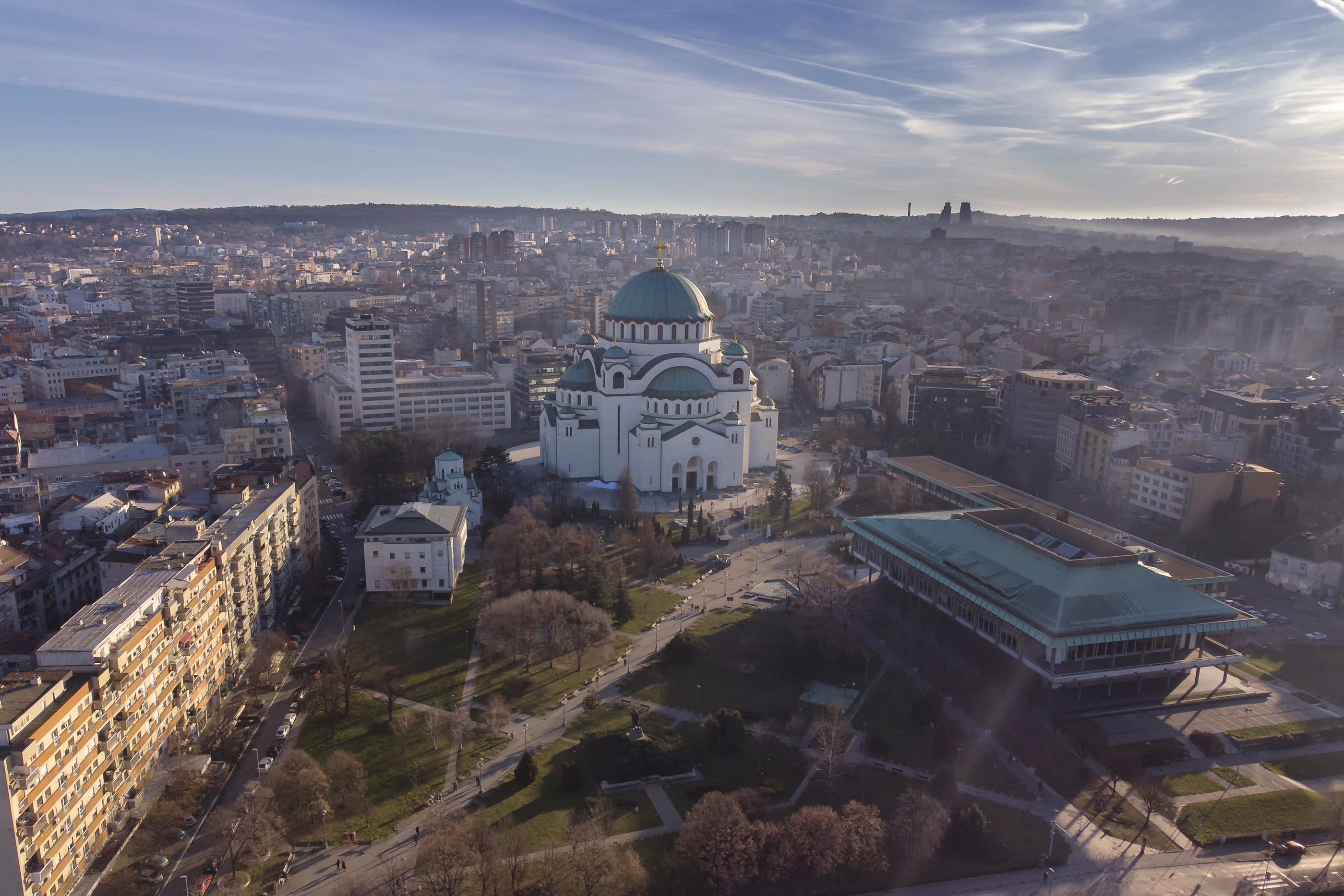
Vračar plateau

The church stands on the western promontory of the Vračar plateau, at an elevation of 134 m above sea level. The plateau is largely flat, except for the mound topped by the statue of Karađorđe. The base of the church is situated 18 m above Belgrade’s traditional geographic center, Terazije. It is also 10 m higher than Tašmajdan Park, where the Church of Saint Mark, the second-largest church in Belgrade, is located. Rising 63 m above the confluence of the Sava and Danube, the church serves as a prominent natural viewpoint and one of the city’s most recognizable landmarks.

In 2021, the Vračar plateau was declared a protected heritage site as the "Saint Sava Plateau". The official rationale cited the "symbolic, memorial, cultural-historical, architectural-urbanistic, and artistic values of the locality", which commemorates two important events in Serbian history: the burning of Saint Sava’s relics in 1594 and the siege of Belgrade in 1806.

== Notable events ==
- Funeral of Prime Minister of Serbia Zoran Đinđić, 15 March 2003
- Funeral of Patriarch Pavle, 19 November 2009
- Funeral of Patriarch Irinej, 21 November 2020

== Tombs ==
- Patriarch Irinej

== Gallery ==
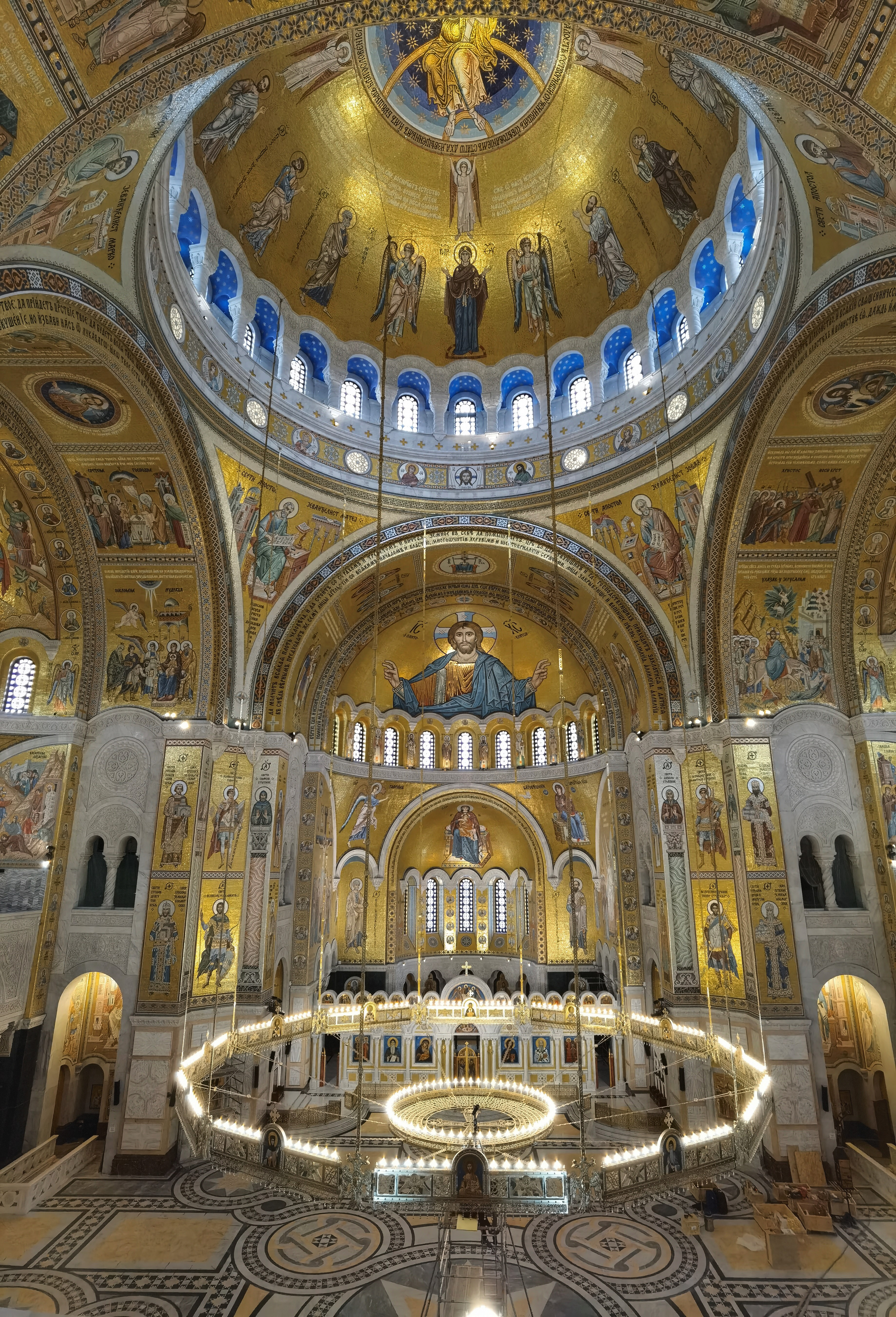
Interior

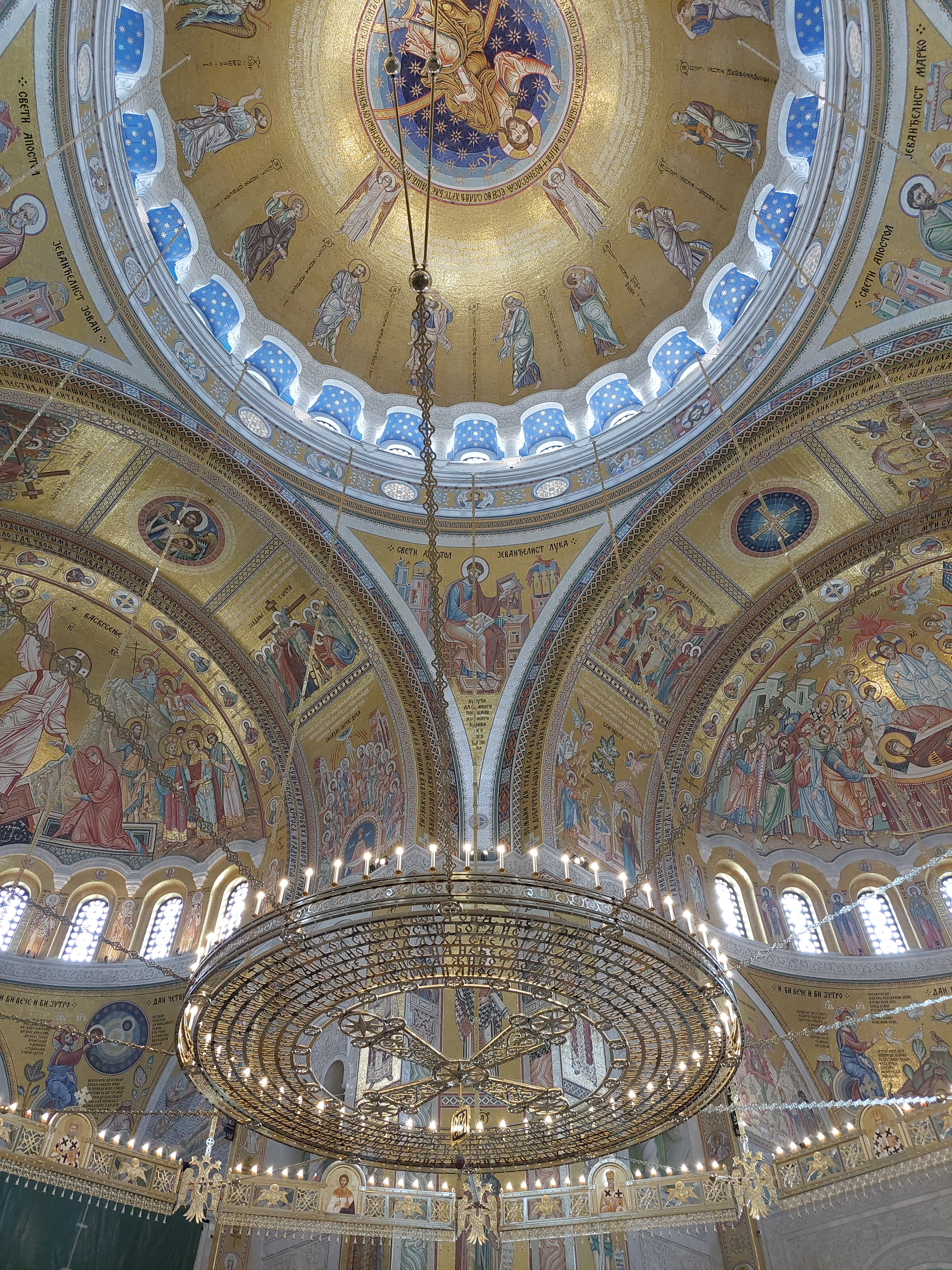
Chandelier

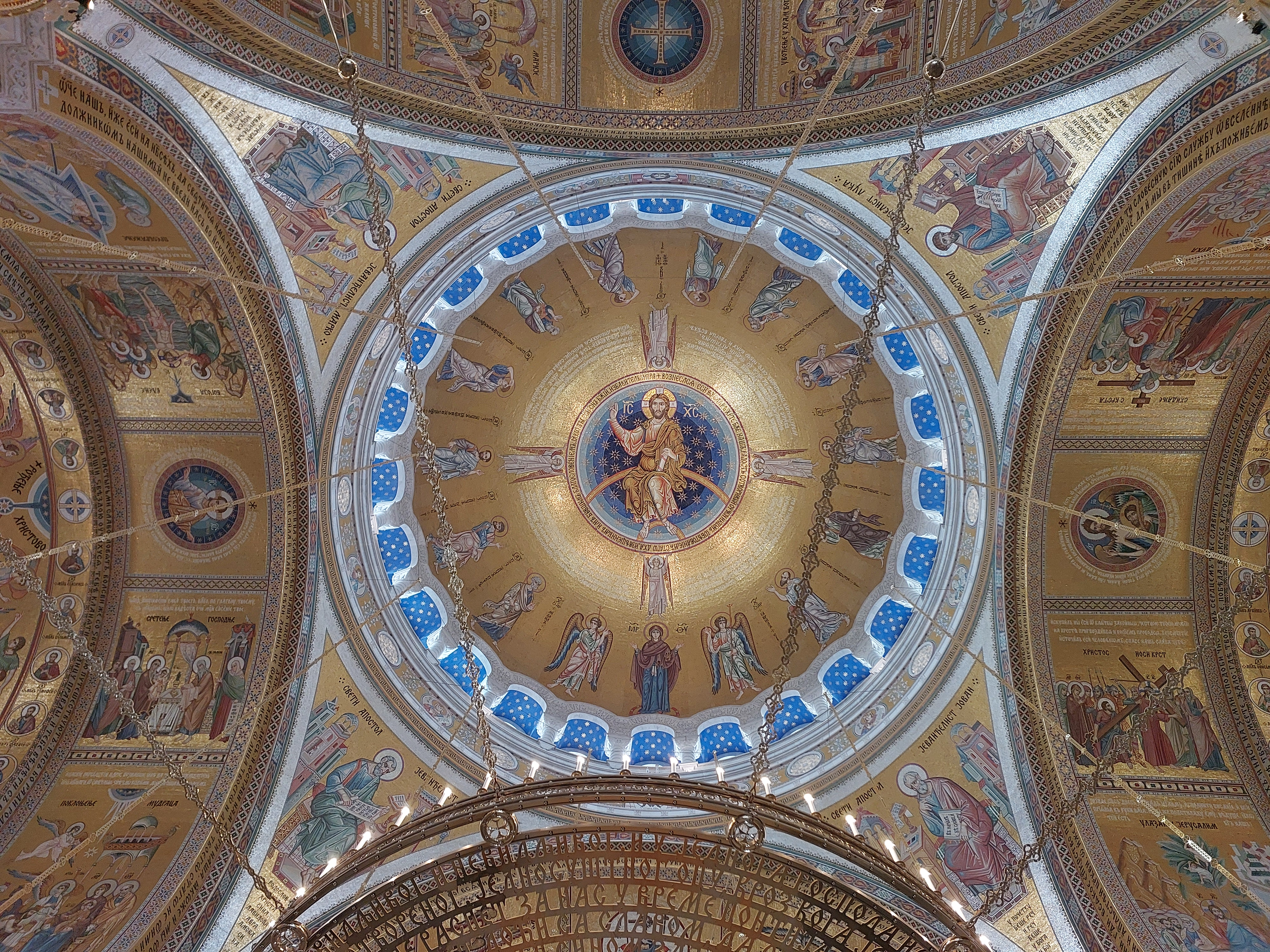
Dome

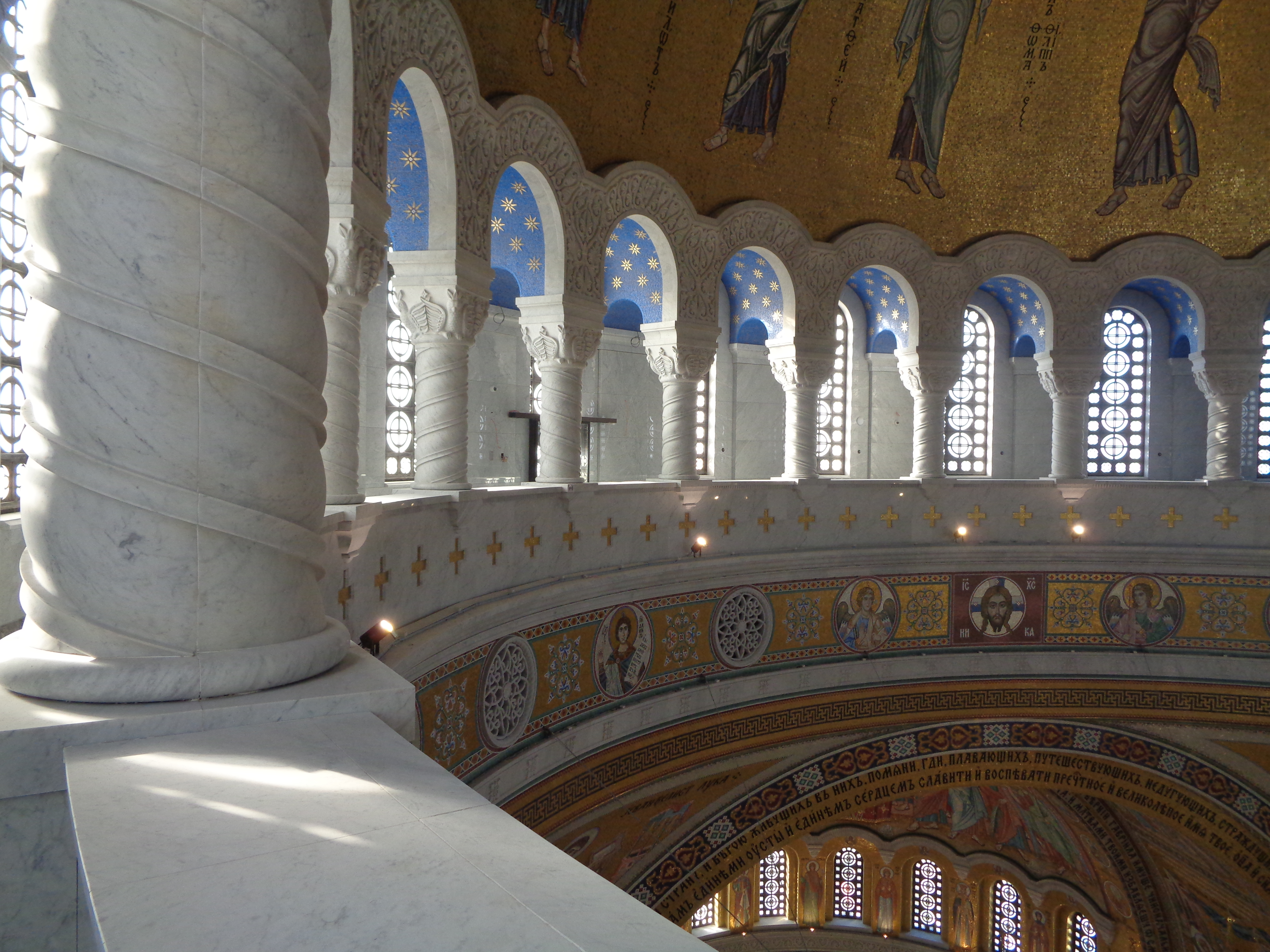
Dome gallery

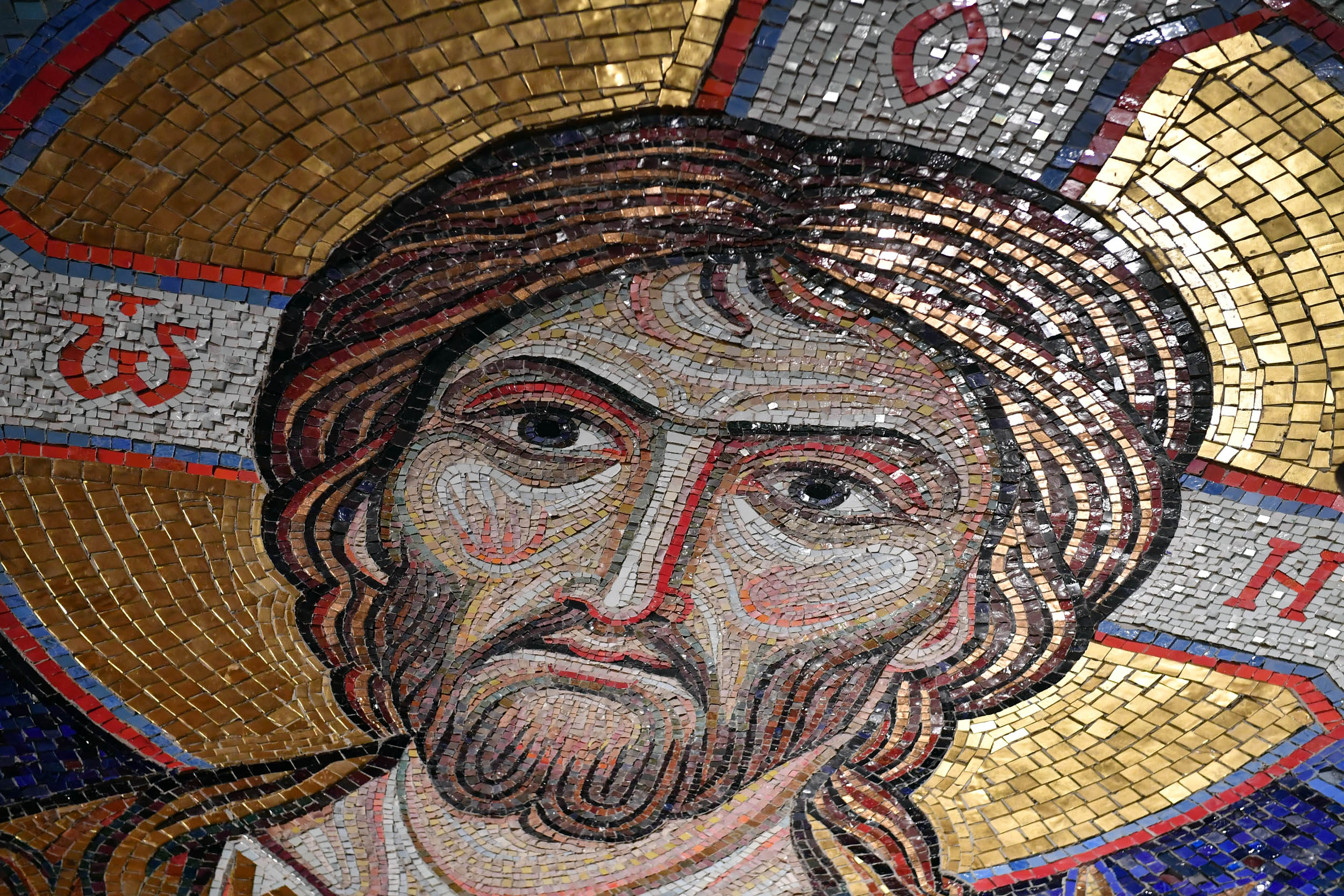
One of mosaics of Jesus Christ

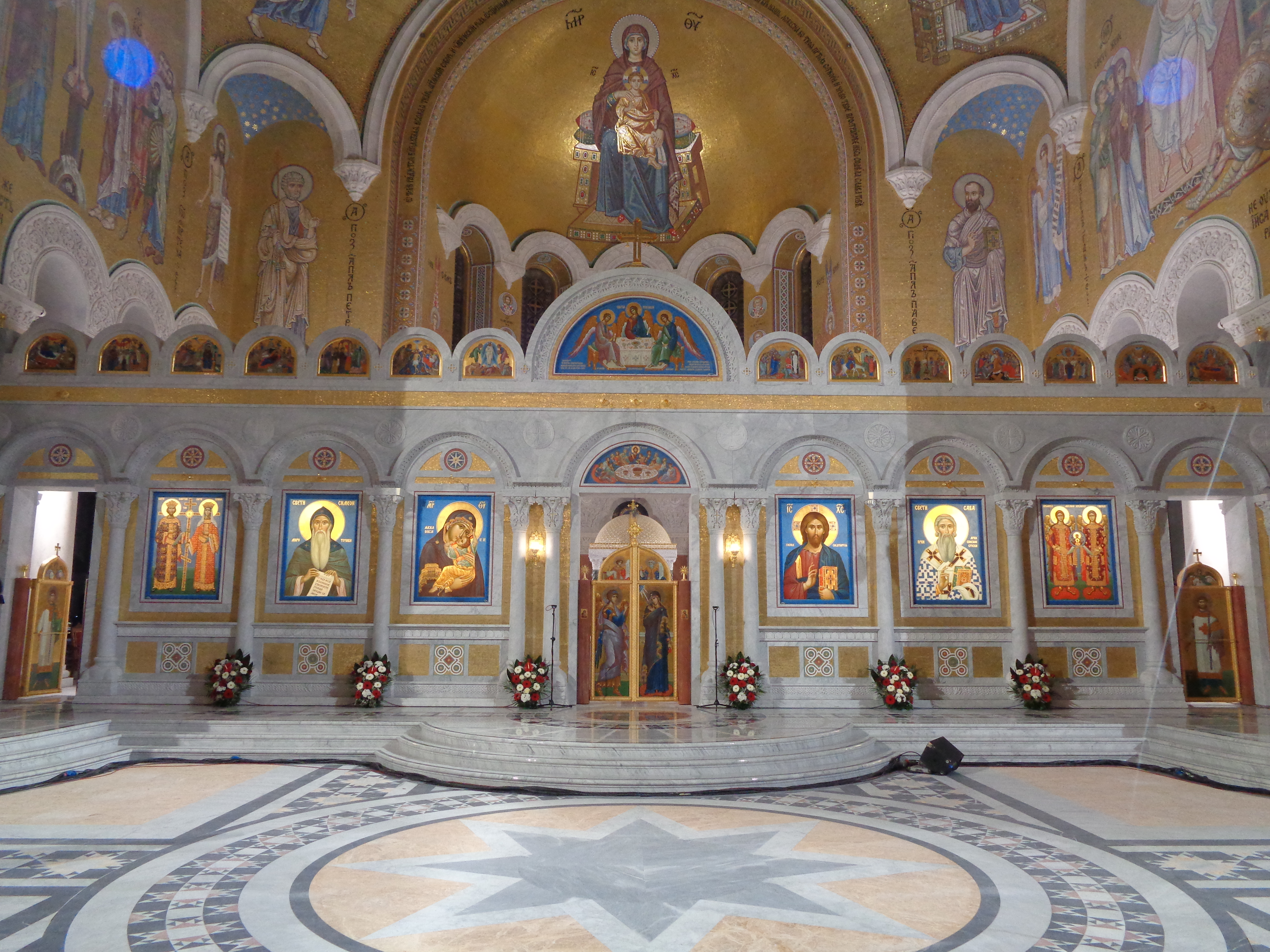
Iconostasis

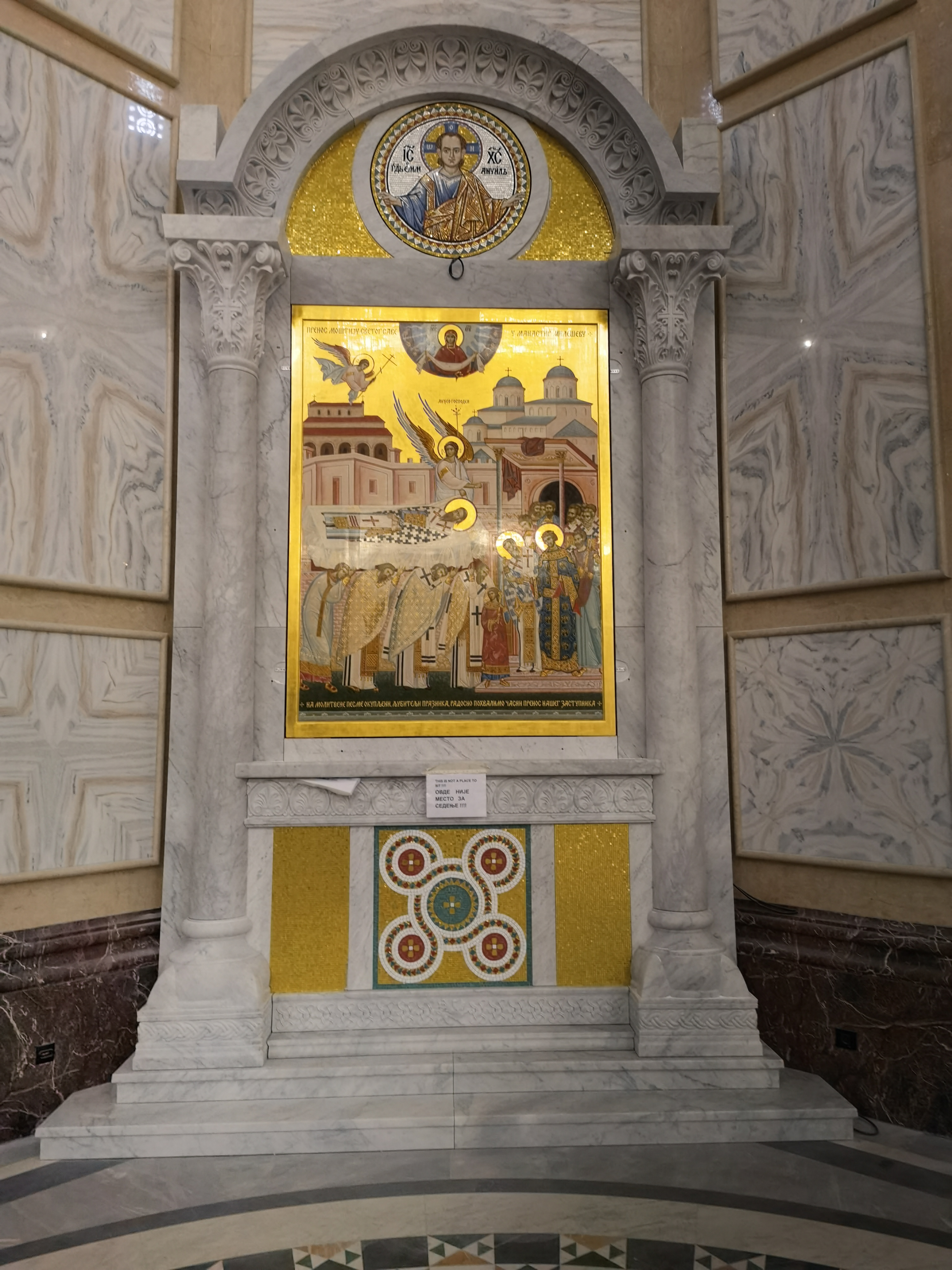
Icon on one of the pillars

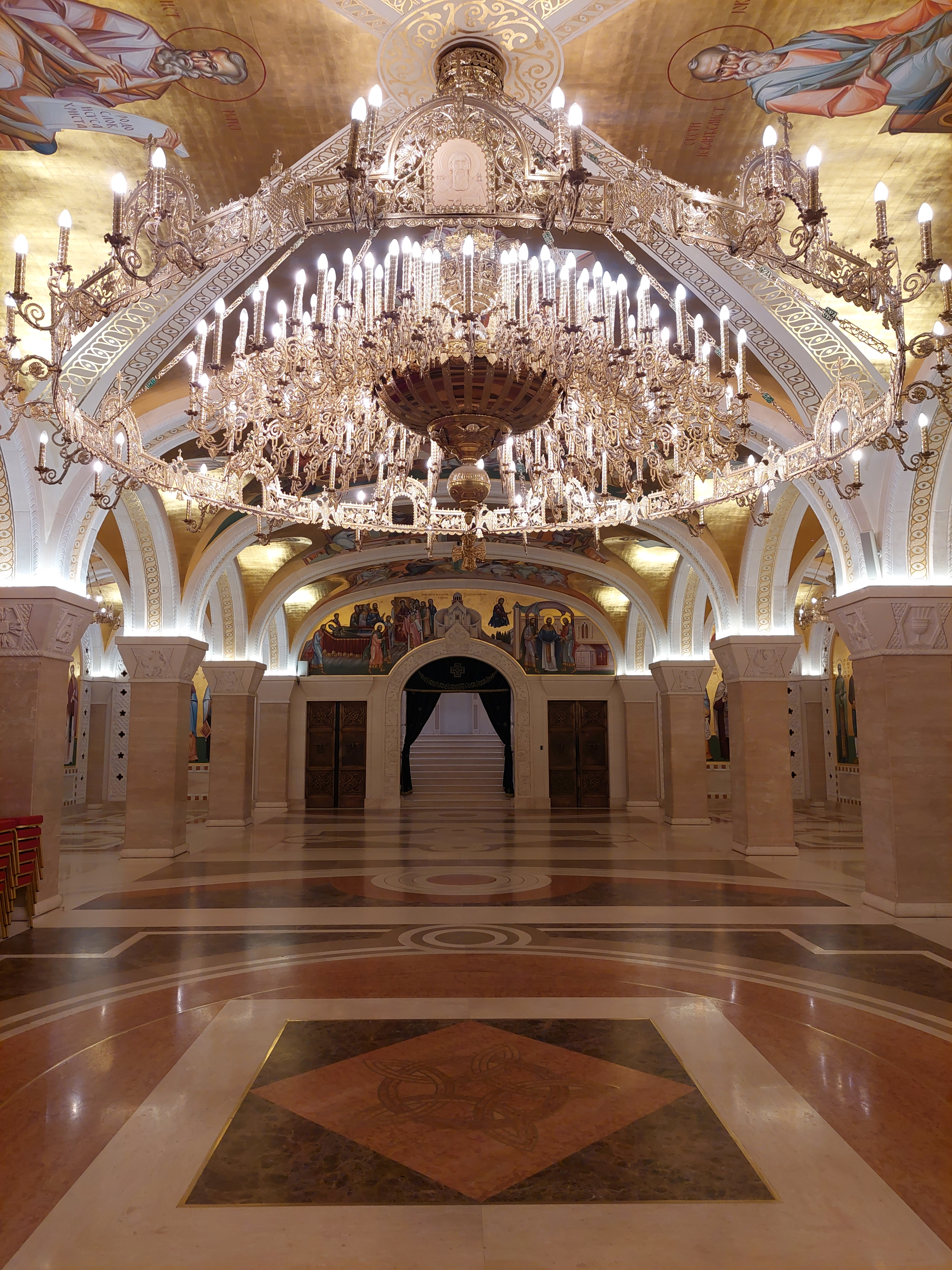
Crypt

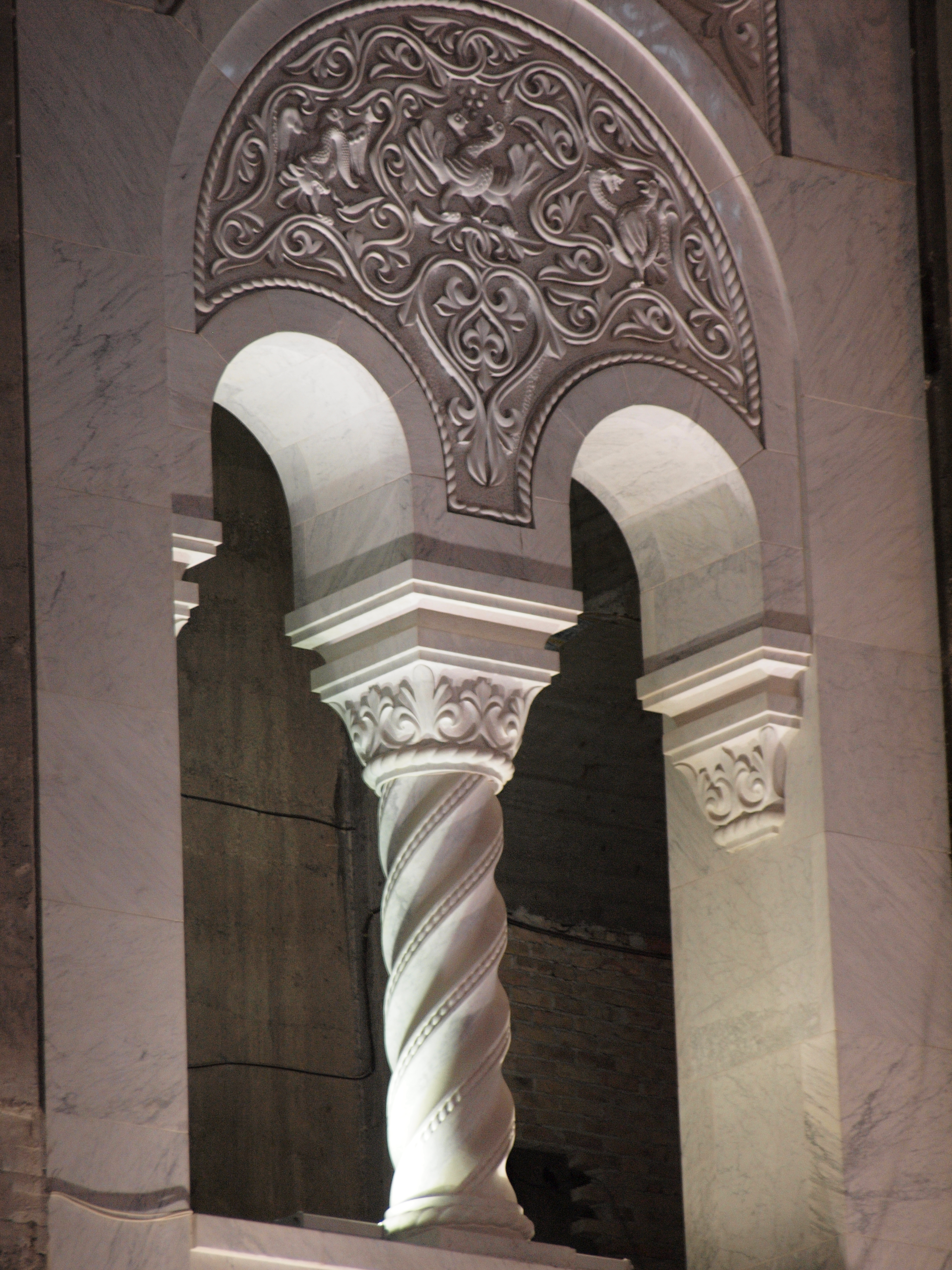
One of byphories

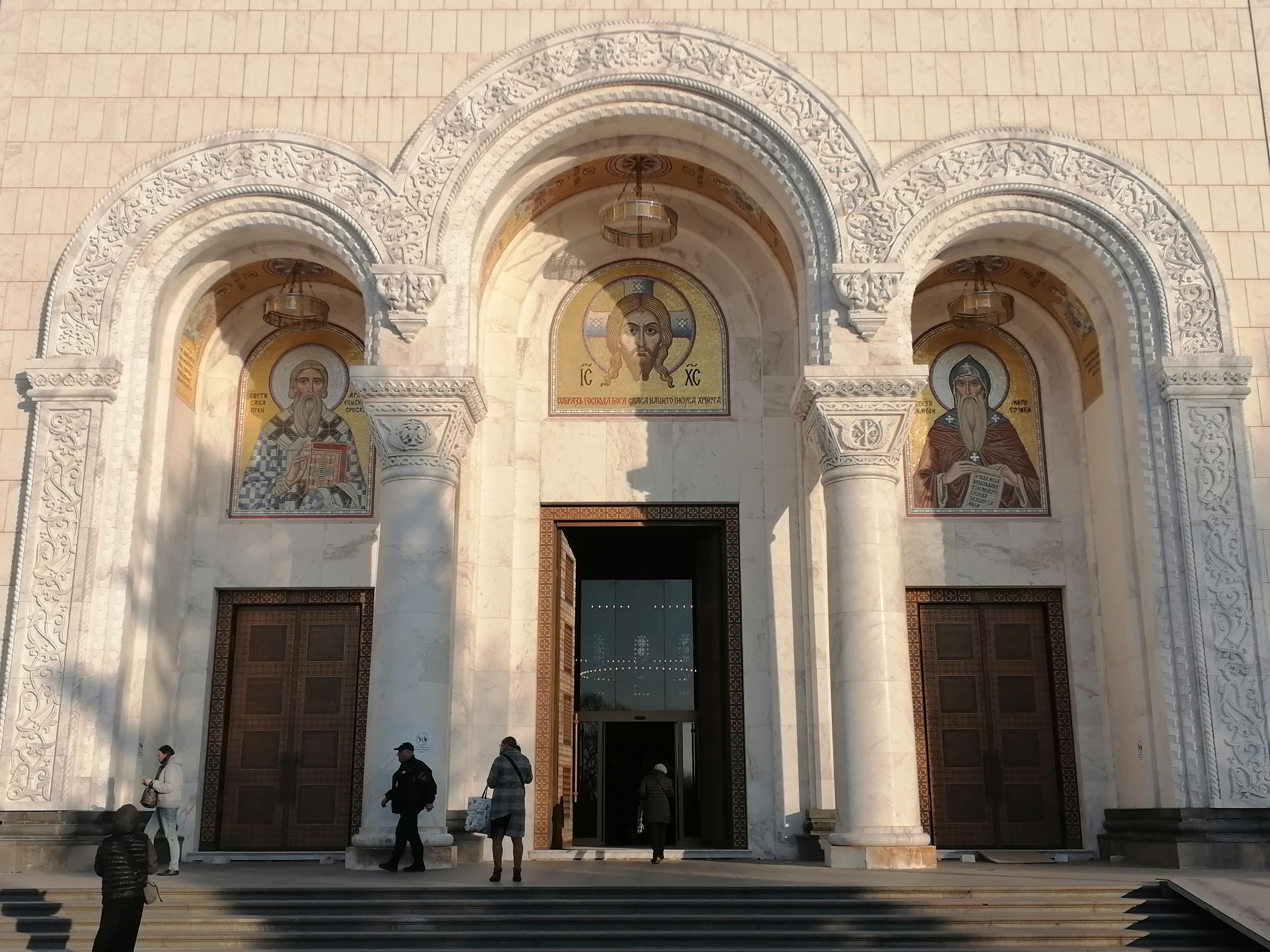
West entrance with mosaics of Saint Sava, Jesus Christ, and Saint Simeon the Myroblyte

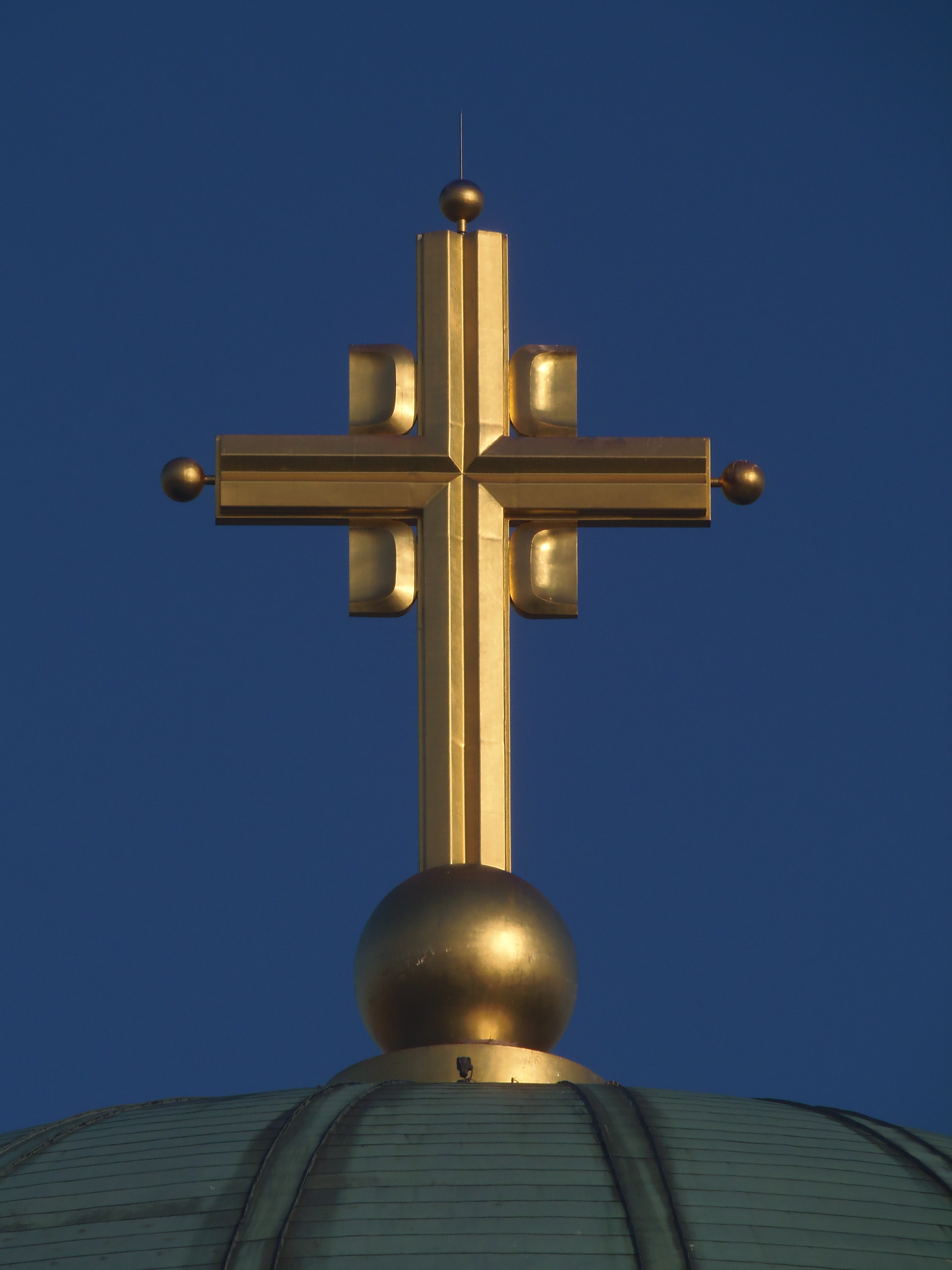
Serbian cross atop the main dome

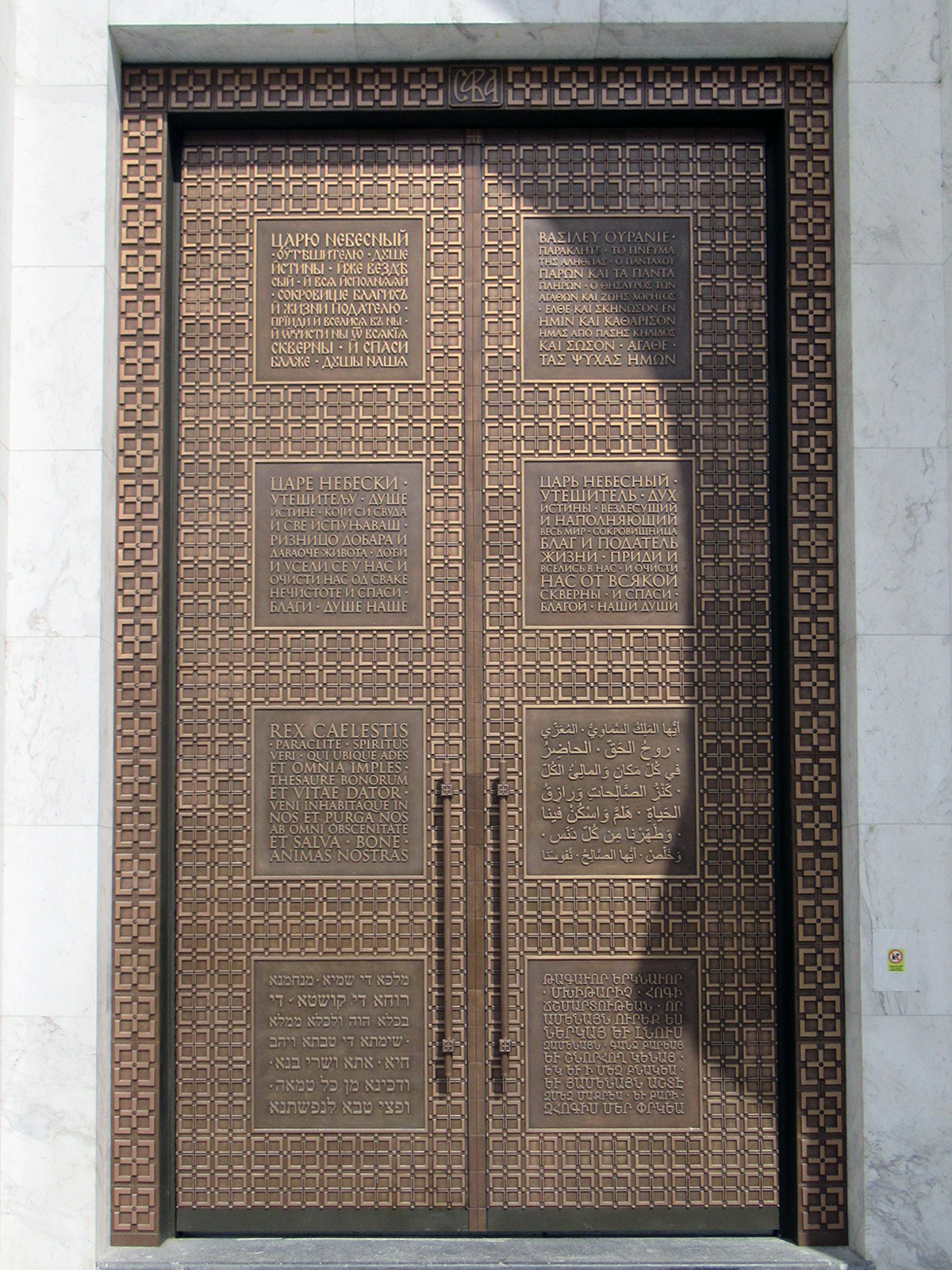
One of the doors featuring the text O Heavenly King in 24 different languages

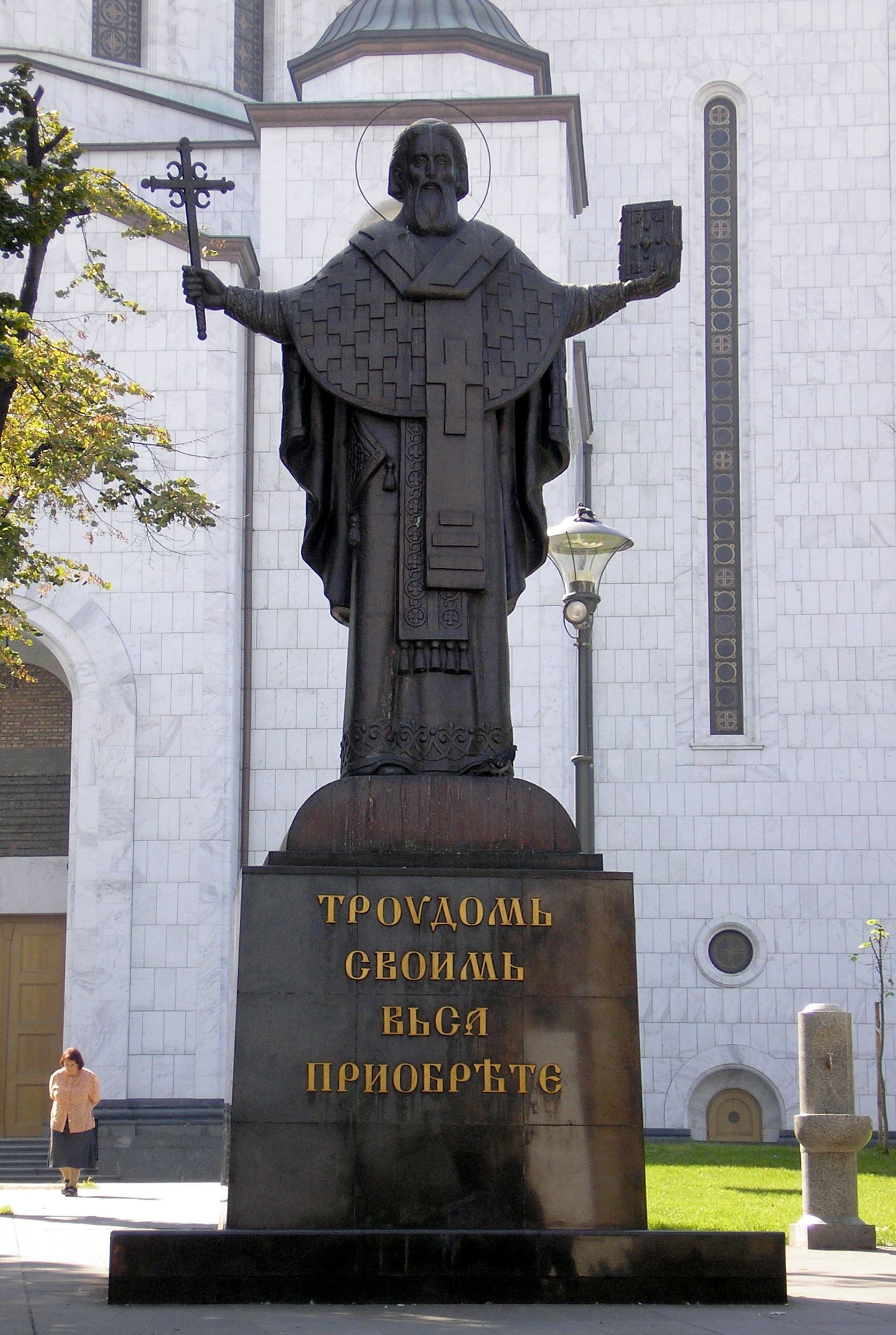
Statue of Saint Sava

Frontview

Frontview

== See also ==
- Religious architecture in Belgrade
- List of buildings in Belgrade
- List of tallest buildings in Serbia
- List of largest Eastern Orthodox church buildings
- List of tallest Eastern Orthodox church buildings
- List of largest church buildings
- List of tallest church buildings
- List of tallest domes

== Annotations ==
1. It is sometimes referred to as a 'cathedral' because of its size although it is not formally a cathedral, as the seat of the metropolitan of Belgrade is Cathedral of Saint Archangel Michael. In Serbian, it is called hram ('temple'), a term commonly used for churches in Eastern Orthodoxy.

== Sources ==
- Aleksandar Deroko 1985: Nastavak radova na zidanju crkve Svetoga Save. Godisnjak grada Beograda, 32: 193–198. (PDF)
- Dušan Arbajter 1992: Saint Sava Temple: heavy building assembly application. IABSE, Congress Report. (PDF)
- Pier Paolo Tamburelli 2006: Hram Svetog Save, the Concrete Cathedral. Domus, 898, December 2006, 68–71.
- Milanović, Ljubomir (2010). "Materializing authority: the church of Saint Sava in Belgrade and its architectural significance". Serbian Studies. 24 (1–2). NASSS: 63–81. doi:10.1353/ser.2012.0018. S2CID 144270672.
- Kadijević, Aleksandar (2016). Byzantine architecture as inspiration for Serbian New Age architects. Belgrade: SANU, Serbian Committee for Byzantine Studies. ISBN 978-86-7025-694-1.
- Ignjatović, Aleksandar (2016), U srpsko-vizantijskom kaleidoskopu: arhitektura, nacionalizam i imperijalna imaginacija 1878–1941., Belgrade: Architektonische Fakultät Belgrad, Orion Art, ISBN 978-86-6389-038-1
- Milica Ceranic 2005: Neovizantijski elementi u arhitekutri Hrama sv. Save na Vracaru. Misa Rakocija, Nis I Vizantija: zbornik radova, III, 397–412 (PDF)
- Ljubica Jelisavac 2019: Institucionalni aspekti konkursa za Hram Sv. Save (1926) i njihove konsekvence. pp 82–83 (PDF)
- Documentary from RTV – "Hram za blagoslov srpski" – Director: Marina Zorić, 2019 (52:17 min)
