= Tatić =

Tatić is a surname. Notable people with the surname include:

- Josif Tatić (1946–2013), Serbian film actor
- Maja Tatić (born 1970), Serbian Bosnian singer
- Žarko Tatić (1894–1931), Serbian-Yugoslavian architect and art historian
