= Vozarev Cross =

Religious Landmark in Belgrade, Serbia

Coordinates: 44.7978°N 20.4867°E

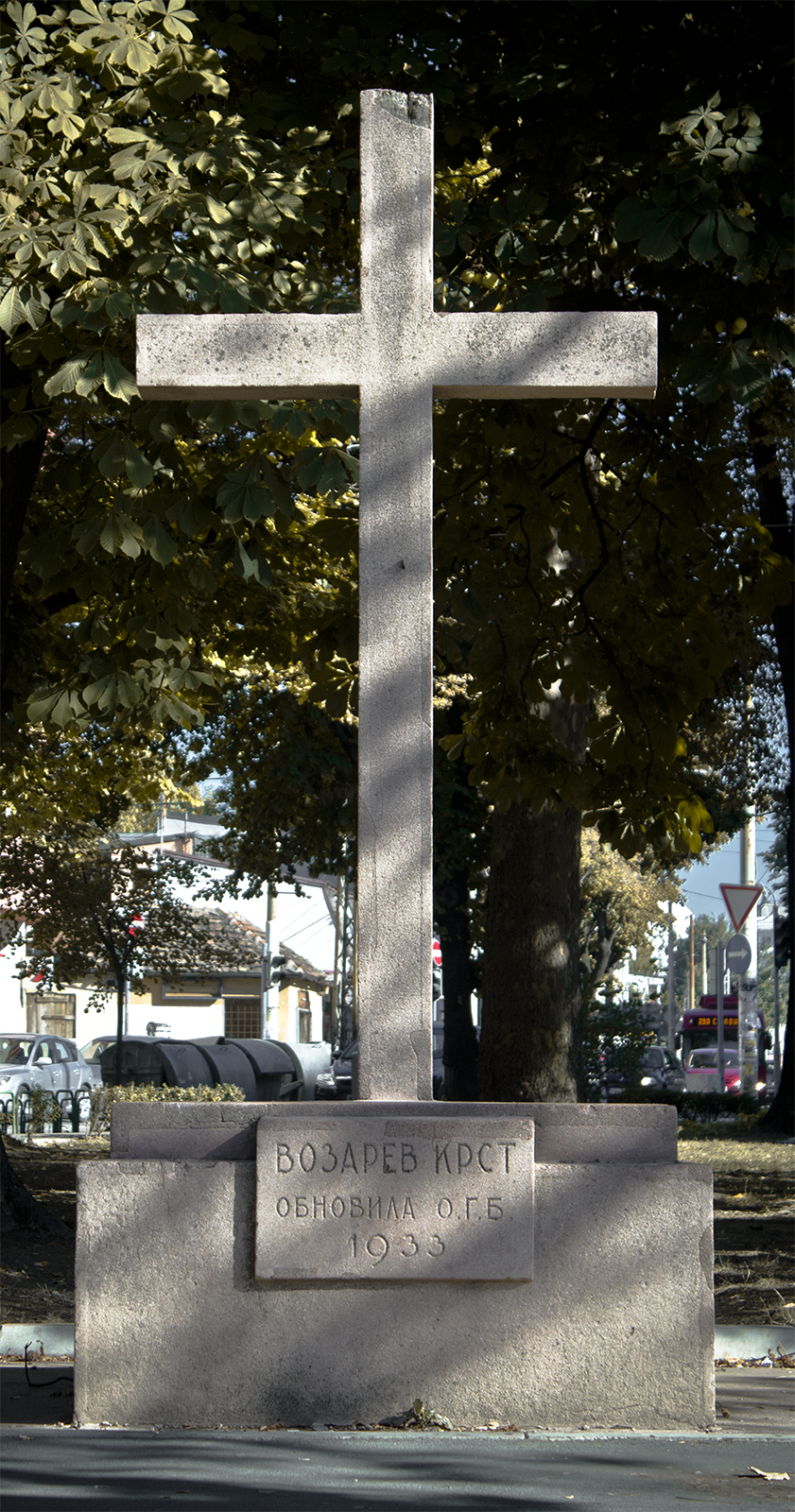
- Vozarev Cross

Location
- Location: Vračar, Belgrade, Serbia
- Interactive map of Vozarev Cross

Architecture
- Completed: 1847

Vozarev Cross (Serbian: Возарев крст, romanized: Vozarev krst) is located in Belgrade, in the park between Vojvode Šupljikca Street and Mileševska Street (municipality of Vračar), and it was erected in 1847. It represents the immovable cultural property as the cultural monument. The famous Belgrade bookseller and a printer, Gligorije Vozarević, erected a wooden cross decorated with icons in his own field at Vračar. The contemporaries interpreted the erection of the cross not only as the symbol of the faith and religion, but also as the symbol of the liberation – the symbol of the victory. For that reason, this cross is considered as the first public monument in Belgrade. The ruined wooden cross was replaced by the Belgrade Municipality in 1933 with one in red artificial stone. The part of Belgrade was named after it Crveni Krst (The Red Cross).

== History ==
After the edict from 1830, the conditions were met for the erection of this kind of memorials in Belgrade. One of the first public monuments in Belgrade was the cross that Gligorije Jovanović erected in his field, at Vračar, in 1847. The monument was very modest. Two icons were hung to the plain wooden cross, the icon of Holy Trinity on one and Saint George on the other side. Below the icons there was the inscription: "To the God and people, Gligorije Vozarević, 1847, at Vračar“. However, the erection of the cross was a novelty in Belgrade, so Novine srpske, the official gazette, wrote about that. In the extended text, published on 18 March the same year, in the end it was stressed out:“ Praise to the merciful God, who made us, so that we can watch this divine sign of our saviour faith in the free field near Belgrade. Grant Lord that people like this custom of the erection of our crosses in the crossroads and fields and all around our town! Honour and praise and gratitude to Mister Vozarović, who was the first to set an example...“ It can be concluded from the text that Vozarev cross at the time of erection was understood not only as the symbol of religious, but also of national freedom. In that sense, it was a religious and national monument. The story related to Vozarev cross emphasized such interpretation even more. It was believed that at the same spot there was a wooden cross back in the time of the Turkish rule, and that it was actually a mark of the place where the pilgrims from Palestine and other holy places were greeted. Vozarović replaced the cross, thinking that he was marking the place where the Saint Sava's relics were burnt. During the first half of the 19th century, the Serbian saints were seen as national heroes, so renewing of the cross as the memorial to Saint Sava gave this mark the importance of the national monument. The ruined wooden cross was replaced by the Belgrade Municipality in 1933, with one in red artificial stone. The inscription on the cross testifies about that replacement: "Vozarev cross, renewed by the O.G.B. in 1933“. The part of Belgrade municipality Vračar was named the Red Cross, after the Vozarev cross. The cross was designed in simple form, without decorative details. There is the inscription on a simple, low, cubic pedestal. Vozarev cross was determined as the cultural monument in 1987.
