= Nikolay Mukhin =

Russian sculptor

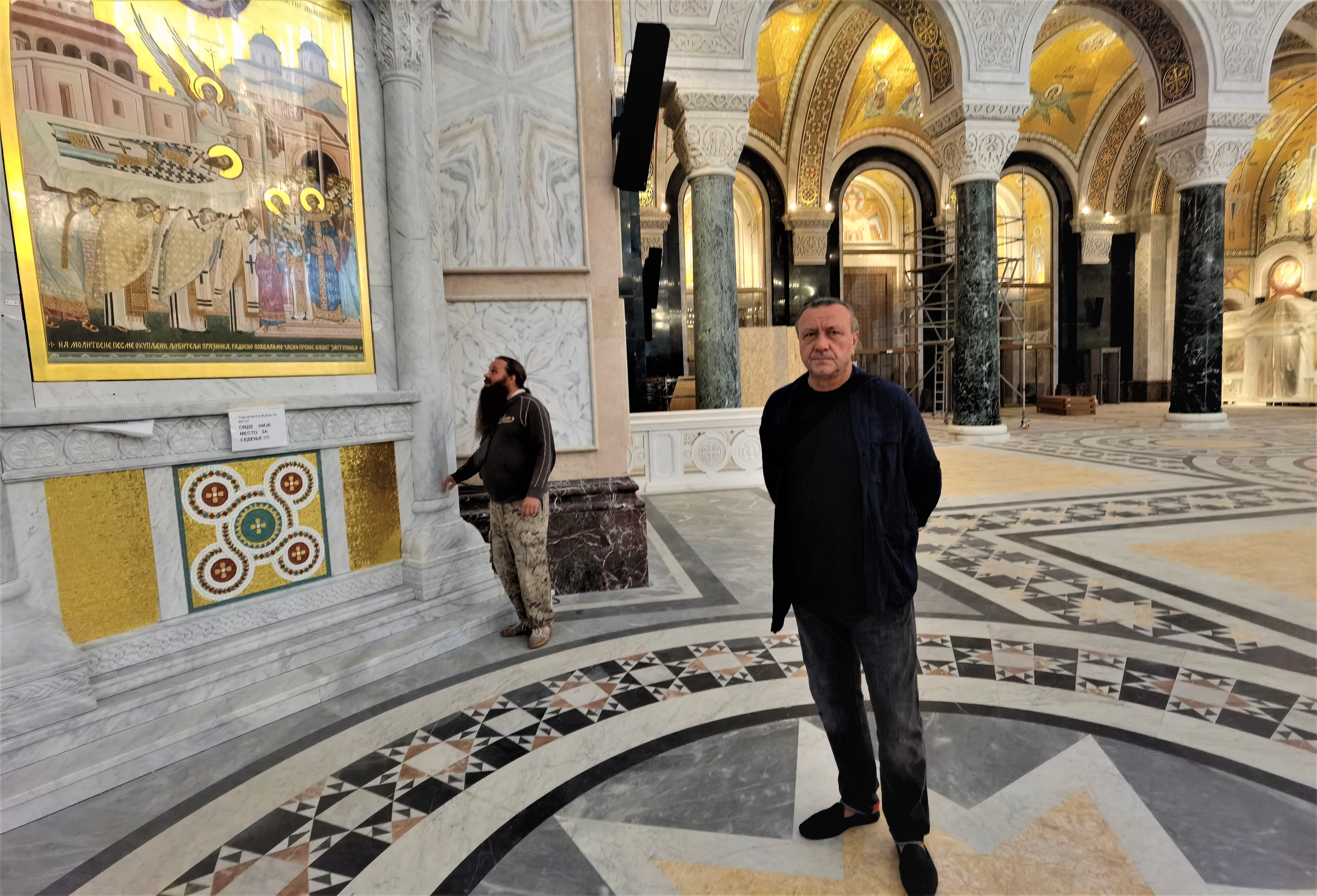
Mukhin at the Church of Saint Sava, 2021

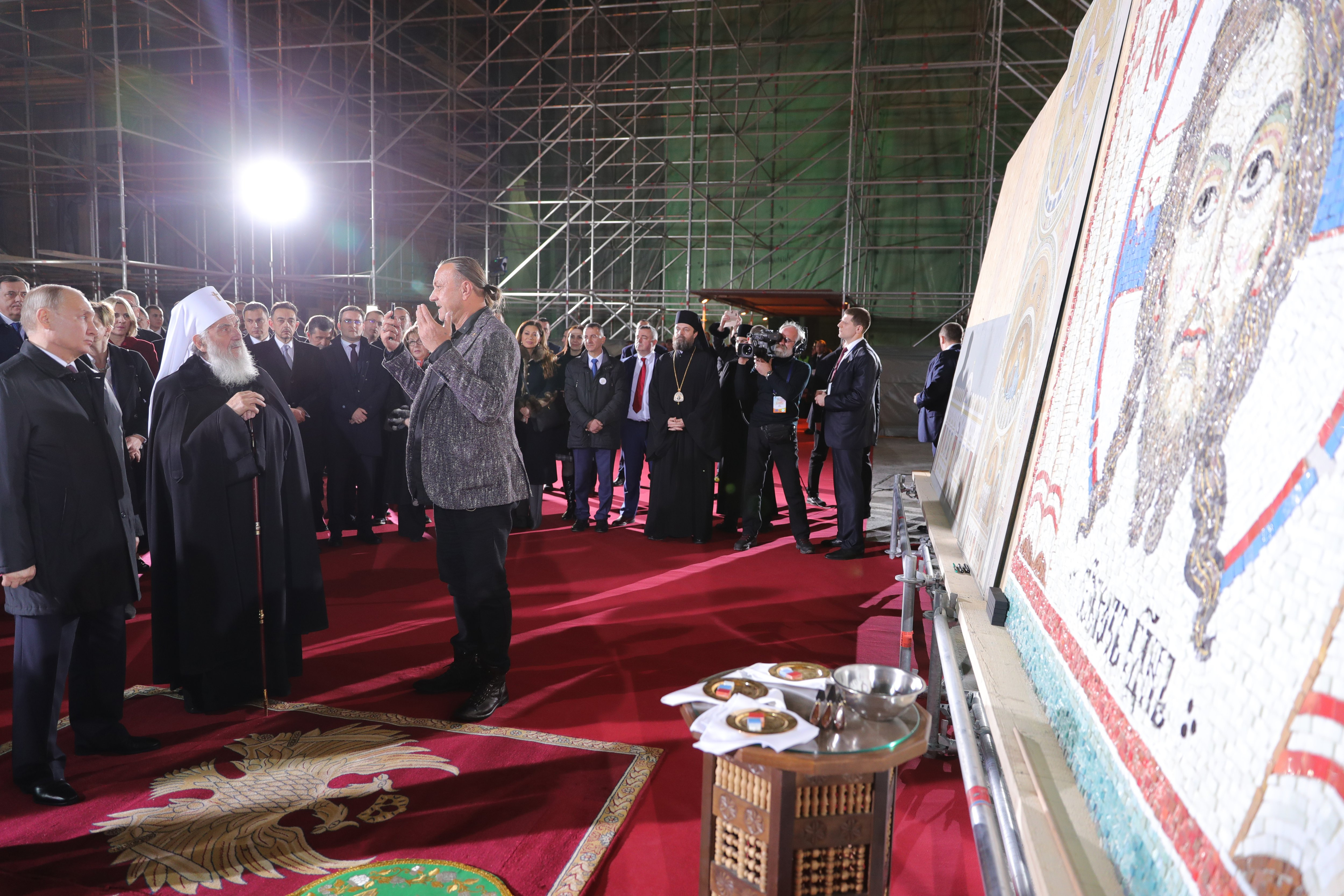
Mukhin with Putin and the Serbian Patriarch Irenej, 2019

Nikolay Aleksandrovich Mukhin (Russian: Николай Александрович Мухин; born 13 June 1955) is a Soviet and Russian iconographer and sculptor. Mukhin is member of the Russian Academy of Arts and People's Artist of the Russian Federation. He established an icon art colony in his hometown of Yaroslavl («Ярославская икона»). His main works are the frescos of the Cathedral of Christ the Saviour in Moscow and his principal work on the mosaics in the Church of Saint Sava in Belgrade, which after completion will form the biggest mosaic ensemble ever executed.

He also holds Serbian citizenship.

== Life ==
Mukhin was born on 13 June 1955 in Kostroma, USSR. From 1970 he lived in Yaroslavl. He was educated from 1974 at the Yaroslavl art school. In 1985 he became member of the Artists' Union of the USSR. He enrolled in studies at the Moscow Art Institute at the Russian Academy of Arts in Moscow from 2000–2005, where he received his master's degree in 2008.

After he finished the frescoes at the Cathedral of Christ the Saviour in Moscow with Yevgeny Nikolayevich Maksimov (Евгений Николаевич Максимов, *1948), he won the competition for the decoration of the Saint Sava Church in Belgrade in 2014.

== Oeuvre ==
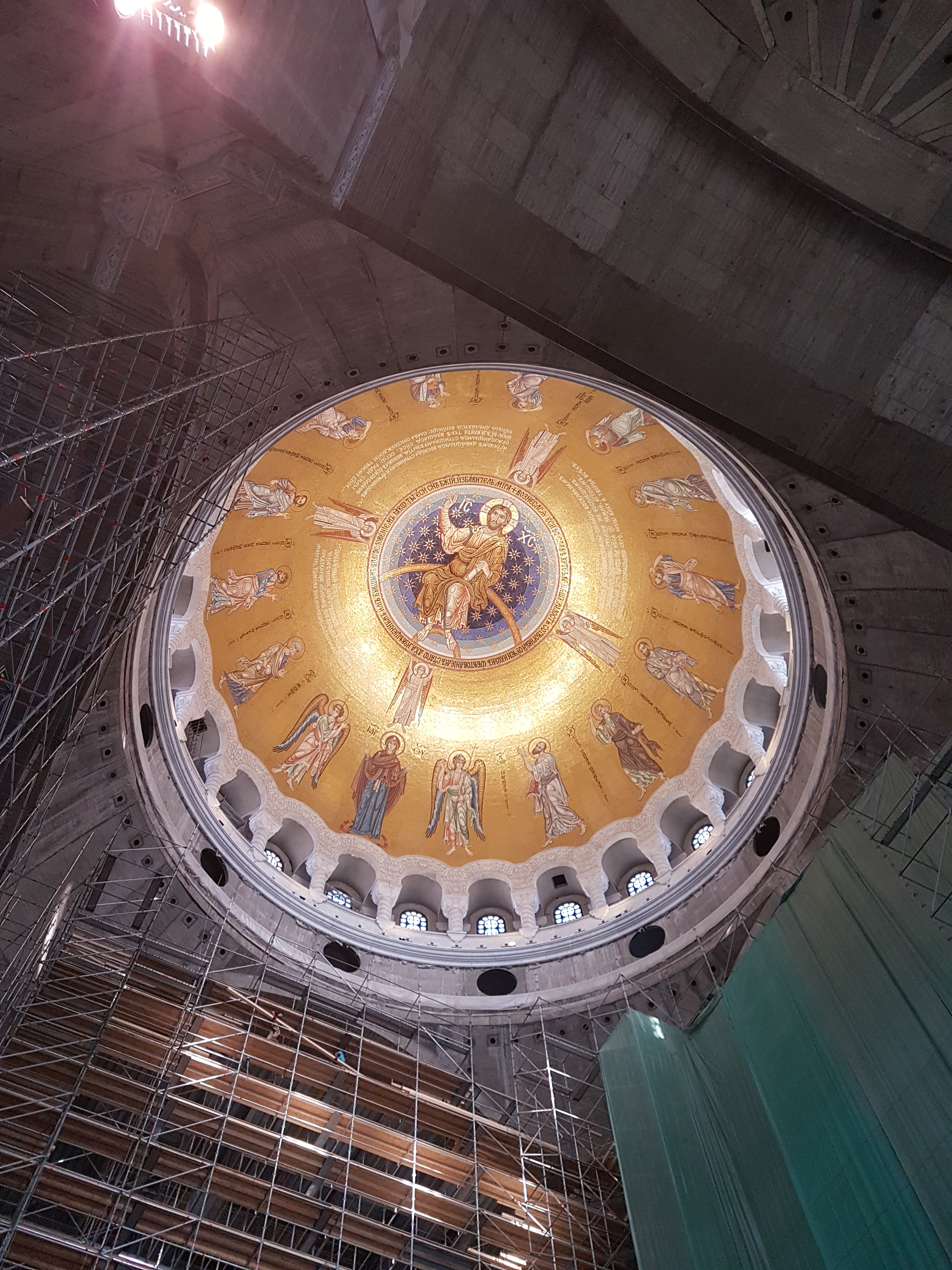
Mosaic in the dome of the St. Sava Church in Belgrade

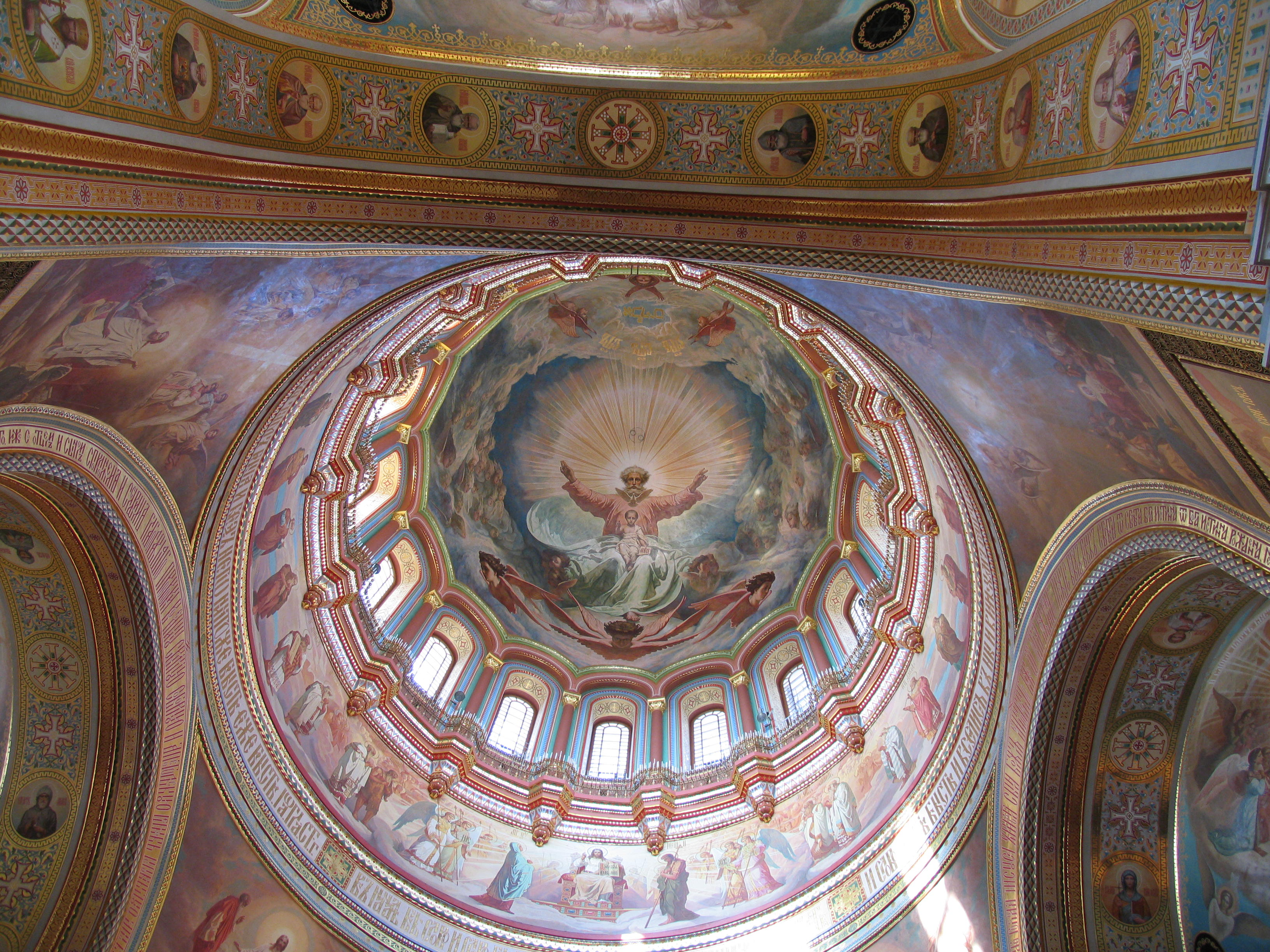
Fresco in the dome of the Cathedral of Christ the Saviour in Moscow

Mukhin has decorated numerous churches in the US, Malta, Croatia, Serbia, Japan and Russia. The works of N. A. Mukhin are kept museums in Russia, including the State Tretyakov Gallery, the Yaroslavl Art Museum, the Norilsk and Togliatti art galleries, the Kursk Art Museum, funds of the Ministry of Culture of Russia and a number of other Russian and foreign museums, and private collections. From 2014 on he worked with the mosaic compositions in the Temple of Saint Sava in Belgrade.

His notable works include the central altar composition “The Virgin of the Day of the Virgin gives birth to Christ” in the Cathedral of Christ the Savior (Moscow, 1997-1999), Images of 28 miraculous icons of the Mother of God with the Child; murals of churches of the Holy Vvedensky Tolgsky Monastery (Yaroslavl, 1994-1996), reconstruction and murals of the chapel of St. Nicholas (Rybinsk, 2011), murals of the Church of the Ascension of the Lord in the city of Ub (Serbia, 2002-2005), murals of the Church of the Transfiguration of the Lord in the city of Zagreb (Croatia, 2005-2007), murals of the chapel of St. Tikhon Zadonsky and the iconostasis of the Church of the Introduction of the Virgin to the church of the Serbian Orthodox monastery Lepavina (Croatia, 2007).

Mukhin has painted 18 churches worldwide, four of them in Serbia, Despite being a Russian painter, Mukhin stated that he tries to paint close to the culture that the church belongs to.

=== Serbia ===
Mukhin visited the Temple of Saint Sava for the first time 1994 in official company of Patriarch Alexy II of Moscow who held service with Patriarch Pavle. Mukhin later worked in Serbia in various church decorations from 2002. Prior to Saint Sava, his main work in Serbia was the decoration of the church in Ub (Crkva Vasnesenja Hrista) which had to be built anew after an earthquake shook the Kolubara basin in 1998 and where he worked from 2003. He then was a member of the board of cultural advisors to Putin, whom he had known since the early 2000s. He explained that in 1994 his first idea came to decorate Saint Sava. As the church encloses an immense space, he stated that for him a golden decoration was the only possibility and that it signified the Transfiguration of Jesus. His main task, he said, was to make the church interior shine from its golden surfaces, he as author saw it as symbol to transfiguration. The impression of the light as a medium of sacral illustration will also be enhanced by illumination of certain scenes according to the church calendar. An impulse in the lighting will change from warm to cool tones, dependent on the religious feast. The smelt of the Tessara was made in Moscow and for the golden and silver Tesserae, pure gold and silver were used. Despite having worked in the Moscow Cathedral of Christ the Saviour, the task in decorating Saint Sava was of different magnitude, as the dome and size of scenes are much larger and the artistic media more complex. His competition entry for the mosaic compositions in the Temple of Saint Sava was chosen from among approximately 50 competitors. His proposal was described as: "the artist uses a specific iconography which reaches back to the Byzantine and Serbian art and creates compositions which redefine the interior of a modern sacral space". Together with fellow Yevgeniy Nikolayevich Maksimov (b. 1948), director of the department of painting at the Russian Academy of Arts, a 1:10 scale model of the dome was made and installed at the Russian Embassy in Belgrade. The mosaic of the dome in the Church of Saint Sava was revealed by Sergey Lavrov during his state visit to Serbia 22 February 2018. The high symbolic value of the mosaic decoration was addressed at the same inaugural event by Hilarion (Alfeyev): “The mosaic decoration for the main cathedral of the Serbian Orthodox Church is a gift from Russia and its President, from the Russian artists and the Russian Orthodox Church led by her Patriarch, to the Serbian Orthodoxy. For many centuries to come it will be for future generations a sign of fraternal love between the Russian and the Serbian Orthodox Churches and the peoples they shepherd.” As of February 2020 a great deal of the mosaic works in the church of Saint Sava has been finished. The main motiv of the four apses are the life of christ with a central figure of the blessing Christ in the eastern apse spanning 17 m. The mosaics are reminiscent of Byzantine works from the 11th and 12th century in Southern Italy (Palermo, Monreale) and Venice. For the ground colour, gold tessera with pure gold are used, as gold symbolizes the transfiguration of Christ. 3000 workers participate in the laying of approximately 13.000 m² mosaic surface works, which will form the biggest mosaic ensemble ever executed. Among his other work for the Sava church he designed the main wheel chandelier in the space under the dome, with a diameter of 20 m and weight of 14 tonnes (the biggest wheel chandelier in any existing church).

== Awards ==
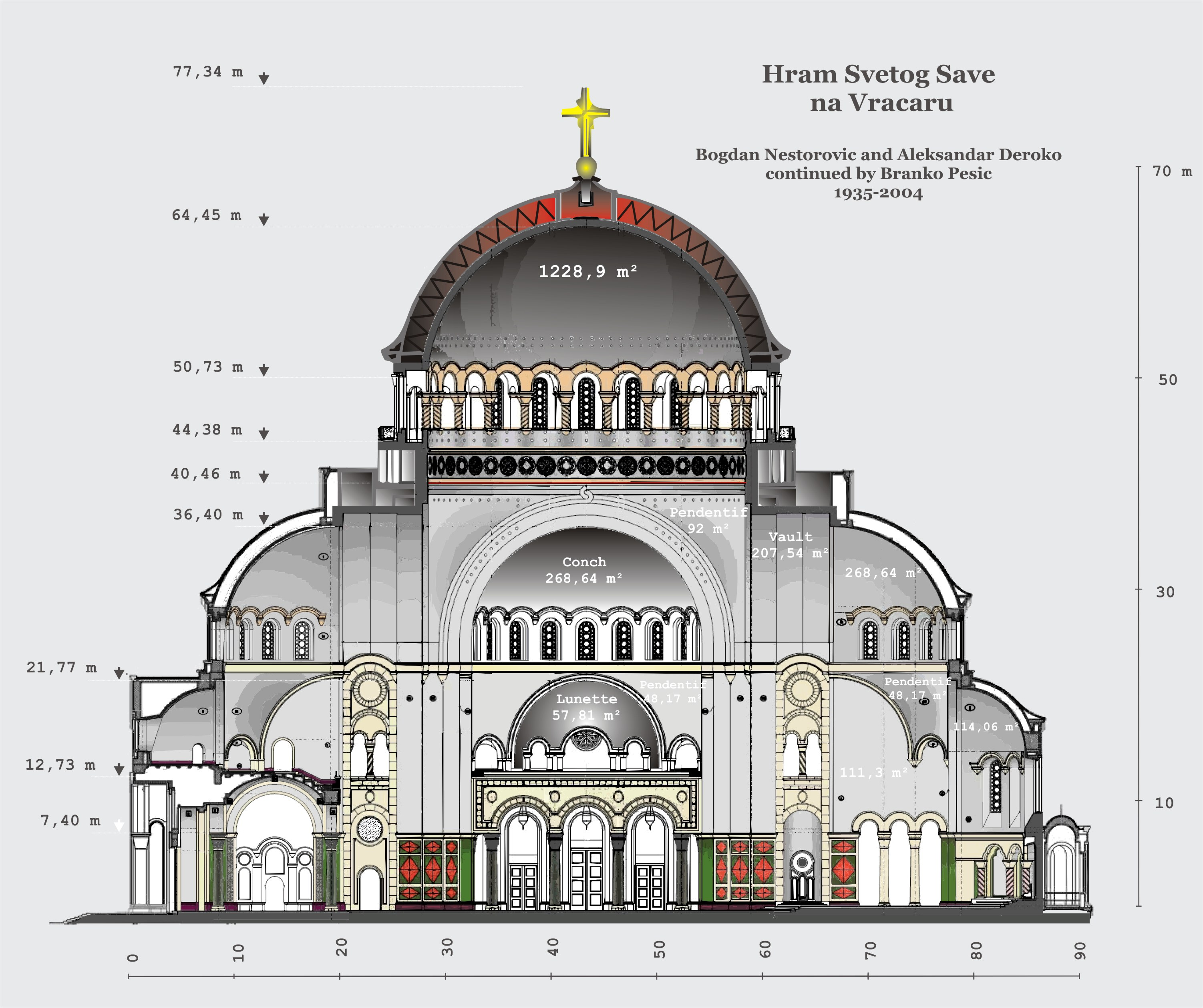
Surface areas of the mosaic cladding in the church add to more than 6000 m² with the dome (1230 ²) and the four conchs (each 270 m²) covering the single biggest spaces

He is academician of the Academy of Arts (2000; Corresponding Member 1997). People's Artist of the Russian Federation (2005). Laureate of the State Prize of the Russian Federation (2011). Member of the Union of Artists of the USSR since 1985. Mukhin was given the title People's Artist of the Russian Federation in 2005, he received among others the state decoration of the Order of Friendship and from the Russian Orthodox Church the Order of Saint Sergius of Radonezh III degree(Russian: Орден преподобного Сергия Радонежского) (1999) and the Andrei Rublev Medail. The Serbian Orthodox Church awarded him the Order of the Serbian Orthodox Church of St. Cantasina I Catherine I degree. The Russian Academy of Arts awarded him the gold medal of arts in 2000.

In the appreciation of his laureate of the State Prize of the Russian Federation, it was stated that Mukhin is One of Russia’s leading monumental artists, icon painter and sculptor, Mr Mukhin essentially revived in Russia the traditions of church art that had been lost during the Soviet period.

To his mosaic decoration of the St. Sava Church, the president of the Russian Academy of Arts Zurab Tsereteli, noted at the meeting of the presidium of the Russian Academy of Arts the cultural value of the ongoing project and emphasized the special significance of the monument not only for the entire Christian world, but also for world art in general. He expressed the hope that the colossal work of authors and mosaic artists would not remain without recognition, and in the future the decoration of the church of St. Sava in Belgrade could serve as a standard for both contemporaries and future generations.

== Literature ==
- Н. Мухин. Скульптура. Монументальная роспись. Живопись. М., 1997;
- Н. А. Мухин: живопись, графика, скульптура, проекты. Рыбинск, 2011.
