= Gligorije Vozarević =

Serbian publisher, bookbinder and editor

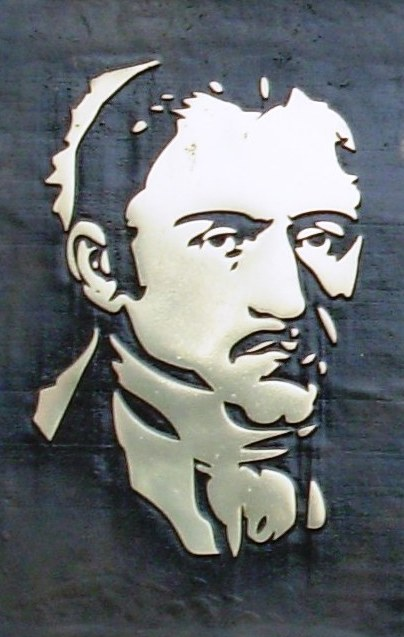
- Born: 1 August 1790; Ležimir, near Sremska Mitrovica Habsburg monarchy (today Serbia)
- Died: 1 October 1848 (aged 58); Belgrade, Principality of Serbia (today Serbia)
- Notable work: Sretenje Constitution
- Spouse: Sara Mihailović

Gligorije "Gliša" Vozarević (Ležimir, Habsburg monarchy, 1 August 1790 – Belgrade, Principality of Serbia, 10 January 1848) was a prominent Serbian publisher, bookbinder and editor. He was the first in Serbia to begin selling books inexpensive enough to make them accessible to a wider readership, while at the same time developing a standard method to pay authors. He began by purchasing the most modern press on the market, moving the equipment into a printing and bookbinding house, and opening a bookstore in the center of Belgrade in 1827. It was here that the first public library in the city of Belgrade was established in 1832. He maintained strong connections with the country's literary elite and played a key role in the development of Serbian literature in the early 19th century. Vozarević published the best-known works by Dositej, Vuk, Sarajlija, and Miloš Svetić as well as seminal textbooks on science and history.

He was not only one of the main Serbian bookbinders between 1827 and 1848, but also considered one of its great theorists and innovators. Miloš Obrenović personally chose Vozarević to reprint and bind the Sretenje Constitution.

== Biography ==
Vozarević was born on 1 August 1790 in Ležimir. His ancestors held the surname Silvestrijević and once lived in Zenica, where they were involved in the wool trade and blanket-making industry. Due to Turkish incursions, they fled from Bosnia to Slavonia at the end of the 17th century, and opened a ferry service on the Sava River, hence their last name Vozarević. Between 1812 and 1816, Vozarević worked at an inn serving tables in Zemun before deciding to go to Belgrade to learn a new craft. In Belgrade he learned bookbinding from a local craftsman, but he wanted to know more about new techniques in bookbinding. He met the daughter of the Serbian prince Miloš Obrenović, who in 1824 was married to Todor Hadžic-Bajić, a Zemun merchant, whom he knew from his time working there. Perka Bajić gave Vozarević 150 florins to go abroad to further his study and practice bookbinding. In Vienna Vozarević met Vuk Karadžić, who in turn introduced him to Jacob Herrman, a master bookbinder known as "Herrman of Vienna".

After learning the art of bookbinding in Vienna, Vozarević returned to Serbia in 1827. There he opened one of the first bookstores in Belgrade. The first location of the bookstore was in the house of a widow, next to a tavern. Vozarević befriended the politicians Dimitrije Davidović and Aleksa Simić, who would support him in all his endeavours.

In 1831, a state-owned printing press arrived in Belgrade from Imperial Russia. Immediately after the purchase of the printing house, Vozarević proved to be very useful to the new state, because he was both a bookbinder and bookseller. His first bookbinding and publishing effort was an 1832 book entitled Serbian Verse. He then published the entire works of Dositej Obradović in ten volumes (four volumes in 1833, five more volumes by 1836 and the last volume in 1845). In his bookstore, in 1832, the National Library of Serbia was founded, then called the "City Library of Belgrade" (there are opinions that this is actually the forerunner of the Belgrade City Library). The library was established under the auspices of Jevrem Obrenović, and most of the books were originally from the private library of Lukijan Mušicki. Vozarević was a bookbinder at the State Printing House for a time in Kragujevac (then the capital of Serbia before it moved to Belgrade), while his bookstore in Belgrade was run by his wife, Sara Mihailović (whom he married in 1828), who was Dimitrije Davidović's sister-in-law.

He published an almanac called Golobica – "The Dove" – the flower of Serbian literature" (1839–1844), which was edited by Miloš Svetić. Stojan Novaković said Golubica paved the way for the "Gazette", the organ of the Serbian Learned Society, and literary critic Jovan Skerlić wrote that it was "the best Serbian almanac of the time." Vozarević was elected an honorary member of the Serbian Learned Society on 10 February 1845.

Vozarević was convinced that he had found the place where the relics of Saint Sava were burnt, and in 1847 he erected a wooden cross in the place of an old wooden cross that had fallen. This cross was named "Vozarević's Cross". It was rebuilt in 1895 and 1923. Later, at that place, the Saint Sava Society erected a red stone cross in 1933, which still exists today, and that part of Belgrade is now called the Red Cross.

Vozarević died on 10 January 1848 in Belgrade. He was buried in the old Tašmajdan cemetery, near today's St. Mark's Church, near his godfather, Sima Milutinović Sarajlija. A monument was erected by his wife, Sara, with whom he had no children. When the cemetery was moved, his mound was muddled and now it is unknown where his grave is.

After his death in 1848, his widow Sara successfully continued the business the way that her husband envisioned, as a meeting place for all important binders of the region, and a reading salon that became a literary club for celebrated literati from Serbia and abroad.

== Legacy ==
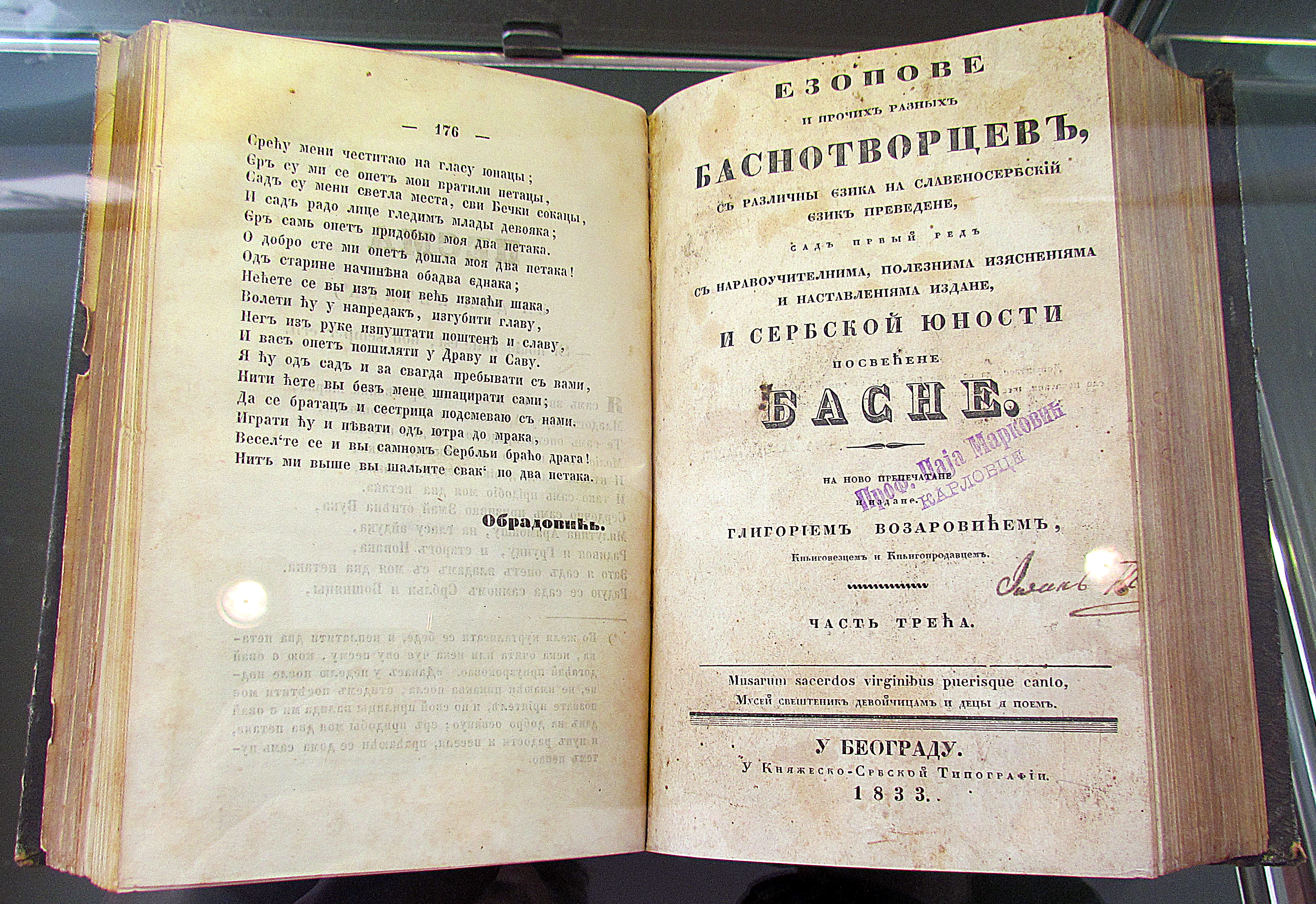
Aesop's Fables published by Vozarević in 1838

In Sremska Mitrovica, the art gallery and library are named after Vozarević, but there is no plaque commemorating him in his hometown.

Miloš Obrenović personally chose Vozarević to reprint and bind the Sretenje Constitution. He did it so well that the Sretenje Constitution is still kept in the Archives of Serbia today in the same condition that he left it.

== See also ==
- Luka Ćelović
- Đorđe Vajfert
