= Ležimir =

Ležimir Лежимир (Serbian)
- Village (Selo)
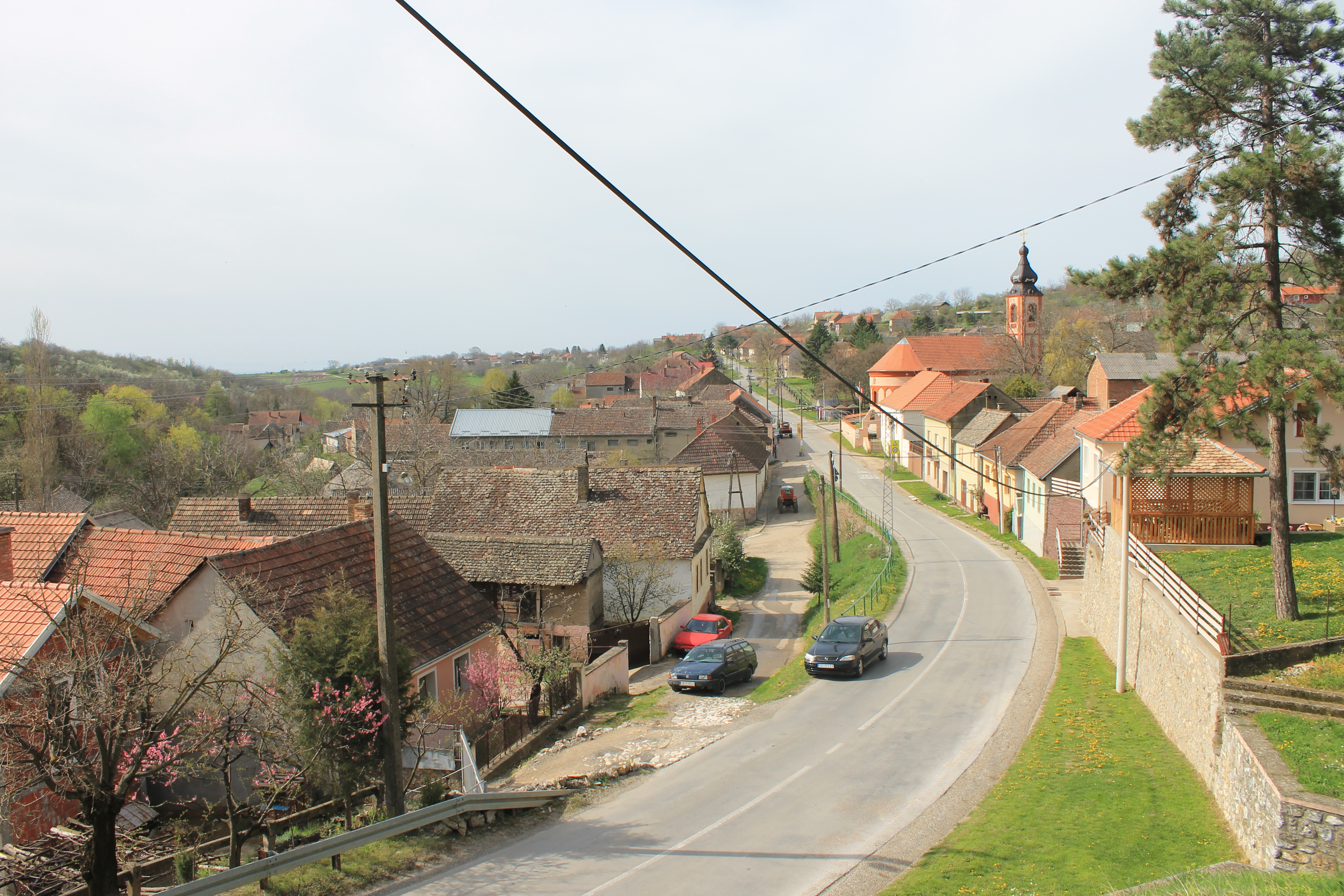

- Location within Vojvodina Location within Serbia Location within Europe
- Coordinates: 45°07′N 19°34′E
- Country: Serbia
- Province: Vojvodina
- Region: Syrmia
- District: Srem
- Municipality: Sremska Mitrovica

Population (2002)
  - Total: 947
- Time zone: UTC+1 (CET)
  - Summer (DST): UTC+2 (CEST)

Ležimir (Serbian Cyrillic: Лежимир) is a village in Serbia. It is located in the Sremska Mitrovica municipality, in the Srem District, Vojvodina province. The village has a Serb ethnic majority and its population numbers 947 people (2002 census).

== Name ==
In Serbian, the village is known as Ležimir (Лежимир), in Croatian as Ležimir, and in Hungarian as Nagylemzsér. Its name derived from Serbian words "ležati" ("repose" in English) and "mir" ("peace" in English).

== History ==
Following Ottoman retreat from the region, the Lordship of Ilok and Upper Syrmia was established, and the village became part of its domain.

== Historical population ==
- 1961: 1,128
- 1971: 1,127
- 1981: 1,006
- 1991: 913

== See also ==
- List of places in Serbia
- List of cities, towns and villages in Vojvodina
