= Žarko Tatić =

Serbian/Yugoslavian architect and art historian

Žarko M. Tatić (Serbian Cyrillic: Жарко М. Татић; 1894–1931) was a renowned Serbian-Yugoslavian architect and art historian active in the first decades of the 20th century. His field of research was the history of Medieval Serbian architecture in the country and beyond (Mount Athos).

He was among the first Serbian art historians to conduct research on Mount Athos. During his stay in the region, in 1923, Tatić carried out a detailed study of the medieval architecture of the area. In the same year, the Serbian Academy of Arts and Sciences decided to send an expedition to Mount Athos and Hilandar monastery, to study its architecture.

Tatić's results were first published in the newspaper Politika under the title Letter from the Holy Mountain, and subsequently included in his very popular and widely read book Tragom velike prošlosti (en: In Search of the Glorious Past) printed in belgrade in 1929.

== Bibliography (partial) ==
- Tragom velike prošlosti (Belgrade, 1929)
- L'art byzantin chez les Slaves: les Balkans (1930)
- L'encien église de cimetière à Smederevo
- Markov Manastir
