= Romani people in Uruguay =

Roma people in Uruguay

Total population
- ≈ 400

There is a small Roma population in Uruguay, most being the descendants of previous migrants. According to data available they number c. 400.

In Uruguay, they are commonly known as gitanos. They claim having ancestors from Serbia, Hungary and Romania.
