= Sandra Joković =

Serbian politician

Sandra Joković (Serbian Cyrillic: Сандра Јоковић; born 1990) is a politician in Serbia. She has served in the National Assembly of Serbia since 2020 as a member of the Serbian Progressive Party.

== Early life and career ==
Joković was born in Kraljevo, Serbia, in what was then the Socialist Federal Republic of Yugoslavia. A graduate of the College of Vocational Studies for Teachers in Kruševac, she subsequently took specialized studies and worked as a pre-school and kindergarten teacher in Kraljevo. As of 2020, she is working toward the completion of a master's degree in the field.

She is a member of Serbia's Roma community. In a January 2020 interview, she said that she had not personally experienced discrimination on the basis of her background, though she had seen anti-Roma discrimination affecting others and was critical of media depictions of the community.

== Politician ==
=== Parliamentarian ===
Joković was given the 168th position on the Progressive Party's Aleksandar Vučić — For Our Children list in the 2020 parliamentary election and was elected when the list won a landslide majority with 188 out of 250 mandates. She is now a member of the assembly committee on human and minority rights and gender equality, a deputy member of the committee on the rights of the child and the committee on labour, social issues, social inclusion, and poverty reduction, a deputy member of Serbia's delegation to the NATO Parliamentary Assembly (where Serbia has observer status), the leader of Serbia's parliamentary friendship group with Papua New Guinea, and a member of the parliamentary friendship groups with Brazil, Cuba, Cyprus, Greece, the Philippines, Portugal, Spain, the United Arab Emirates, and Venezuela.

=== Municipal politics ===
Joković received the thirty-fifth position on the Progressive Party's list for the Kraljevo city assembly in the 2020 Serbian local elections and was elected when the list won a majority victory with forty-six out of seventy mandates.
