= Murder of Dušan Jovanović =

1997 child murder in Serbia

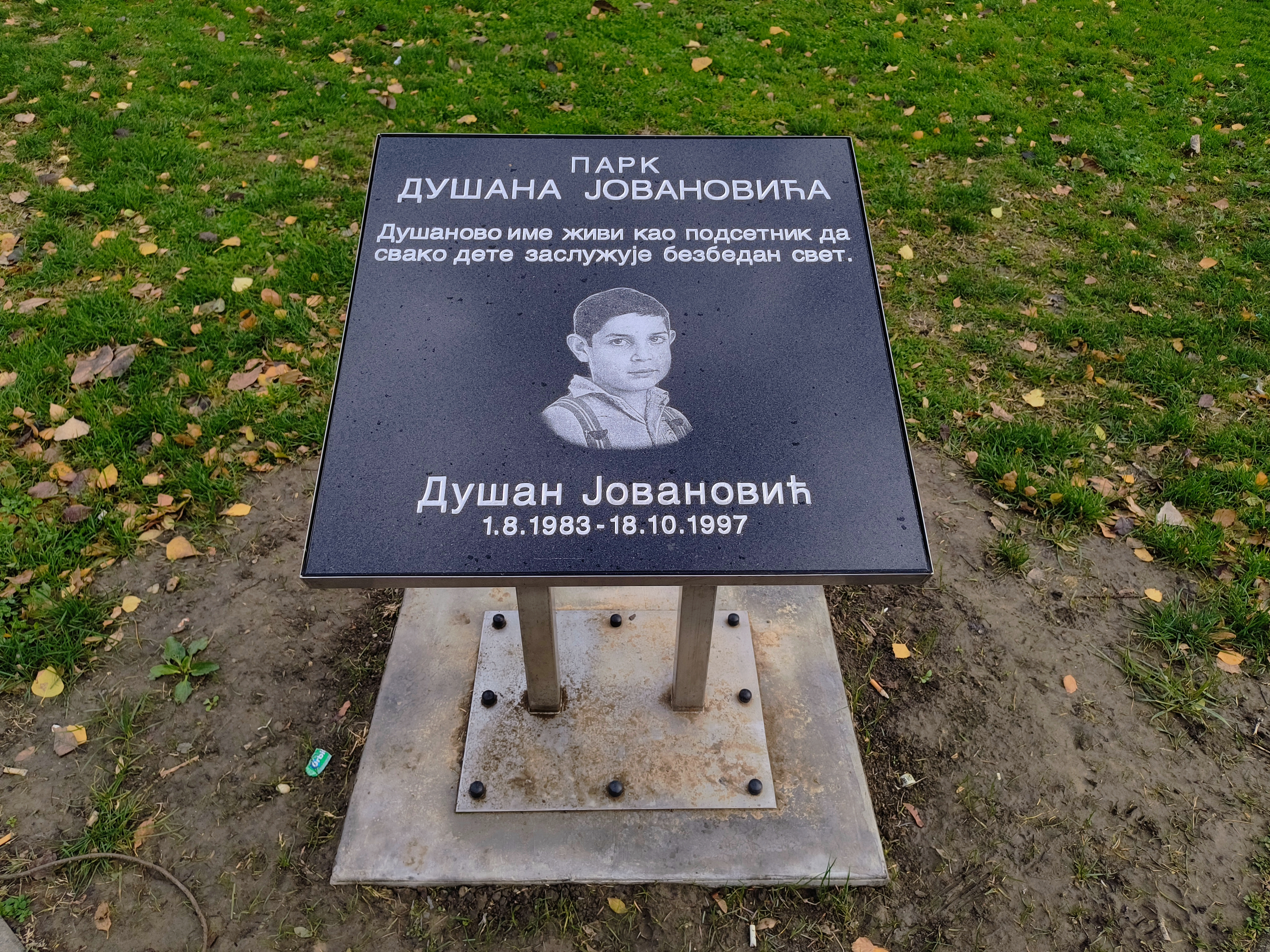
Memorial plaque to Dušan Jovanović in the park in Slavija, which is named after him

Dušan Jovanović (Serbian Cyrillic: Душан Јовановић) was a 13-year-old ethnic Romani boy from Belgrade, FR Yugoslavia, who was murdered on 18 October 1997 by two 17-year-old skinheads. He was beaten to death on Beogradska Street in downtown Belgrade while walking to a grocery store. The murder was motivated solely by his Romani origin.

== Childhood ==
Dušan Jovanović was born to a Romani family on 1 August 1983, in Belgrade, where he lived with his parents, Milica and Aleksandar, and his sister, Duška. He attended the Vladislav Ribnikar Elementary School and was remembered as a quiet, gentle boy with a love for music and drawing, signing his works as "Dux." Dušan was excited to become an uncle as his sister was pregnant in 1997 and hoped the baby would be named Kristina if it were a girl.

According to the family, on the day of his murder, Dušan had spent time with his grandfather in Mirijevo, fishing and playing basketball. Upon returning home, at around nine o'clock in the evening, he asked for permission to go to a nearby store to buy Coca-Cola to accompany a planned evening of watching wrestling on television. He feared encounters with local skinheads, who were known to gather near his home.

== Murder ==
On October 18, 1997, Jovanović encountered a group of skinheads near the store. They initially demanded money, then attacked him, knocking him to the ground, kicking him, and striking him with a piece of guttering until his neck was broken. Passersby did not intervene. Four skinheads reportedly then fled in the direction of Slavija Square. Jovanović's body was found by two girls who alerted the police. His father, concerned when Dušan did not return home, discovered his lifeless body shortly thereafter.

== Aftermath ==
Following Dušan's murder, his family relocated to Marinkova Bara, where they spent the next year and a half, and then to Orlovsko Naselje in Mirijevo. His mother attempted suicide multiple times before her death by suicide in 2015, and his father died in 2016 after prolonged health issues, including the amputation of both legs. Following their parents' deaths, Duška moved to Sweden with her son Dušan and her younger sister, Kristina, who was born three years after Dušan's murder.

=== Trial ===
Two 17-year-olds, Milan Čujić and Ištvan Fendrik, were arrested and convicted of Jovanović's murder. The defendants claimed they were intoxicated and had not intended to kill him, only to beat him as they had done to others before. They were sentenced to ten years in a juvenile correctional facility. Due to amnesty, their sentence was reduced by 18 months, and by a special decision of the Belgrade District Court, their sentence was further reduced. They were incarcerated at the Correctional Facility for Minors in Valjevo. Fendrik was released on 1 April 2004 and Čujić on 30 April.

=== Commemoration ===
Two memorial plaques mark the site of Jovanović's murder, one installed by his parents and another by the Roma Union of Serbia in 2007, unveiled by then-President Boris Tadić. In 2022, an initiative was launched to name a park at Slavija Square after him, supported by local activists, his former classmates, and the Commissioner for the Protection of Equality. Although unresolved property issues delayed formal recognition, a symbolic plaque was placed in 2022, and the proposal remains under consideration.

In 2022, with support from A 11 - Initiative for Social and Economic Rights, Duška Jovanović proposed renaming the park at Slavija, informally known as Mitićeva Rupa, in honor of Dušan Jovanović. The initiative, backed by Dušan's former classmates and the Commissioner for the Protection of Equality, included placing a symbolic plaque in the park on 18 October. By 2023, the Commission for Monuments and Names of Squares and Streets of Belgrade had not formalized the proposal, citing unresolved property issues, as part of the park is privately owned. A revised proposal in September 2023 focused on the publicly owned section. The initiative was supported by Minister for Human and Minority Rights and Social Dialogue, Tomislav Žigmanov, who also laid flowers at Dušan's former home during the 26th-anniversary commemoration.

Each year, a memorial football tournament honoring Jovanović takes place in Mirijevo, with ongoing support from the Zvezdara Municipality. Ahead of the 26th anniversary of his murder in 2023, a mural featuring his image and the inscription "We remember Dušan! (1.8.1983 – 18.10.1997.)" was created in Mirijevo.

== See also ==
- Roma people in Serbia
- Anti-Romani sentiment
- 2008–2009 neo-Nazi murders of Roma in Hungary
- Dragan Maksimović – Serbian actor fatally attacked in Belgrade in 2000, mistaken for being Romani
