= Manjež =

Public park in Belgrade, Serbia

Manjež Park
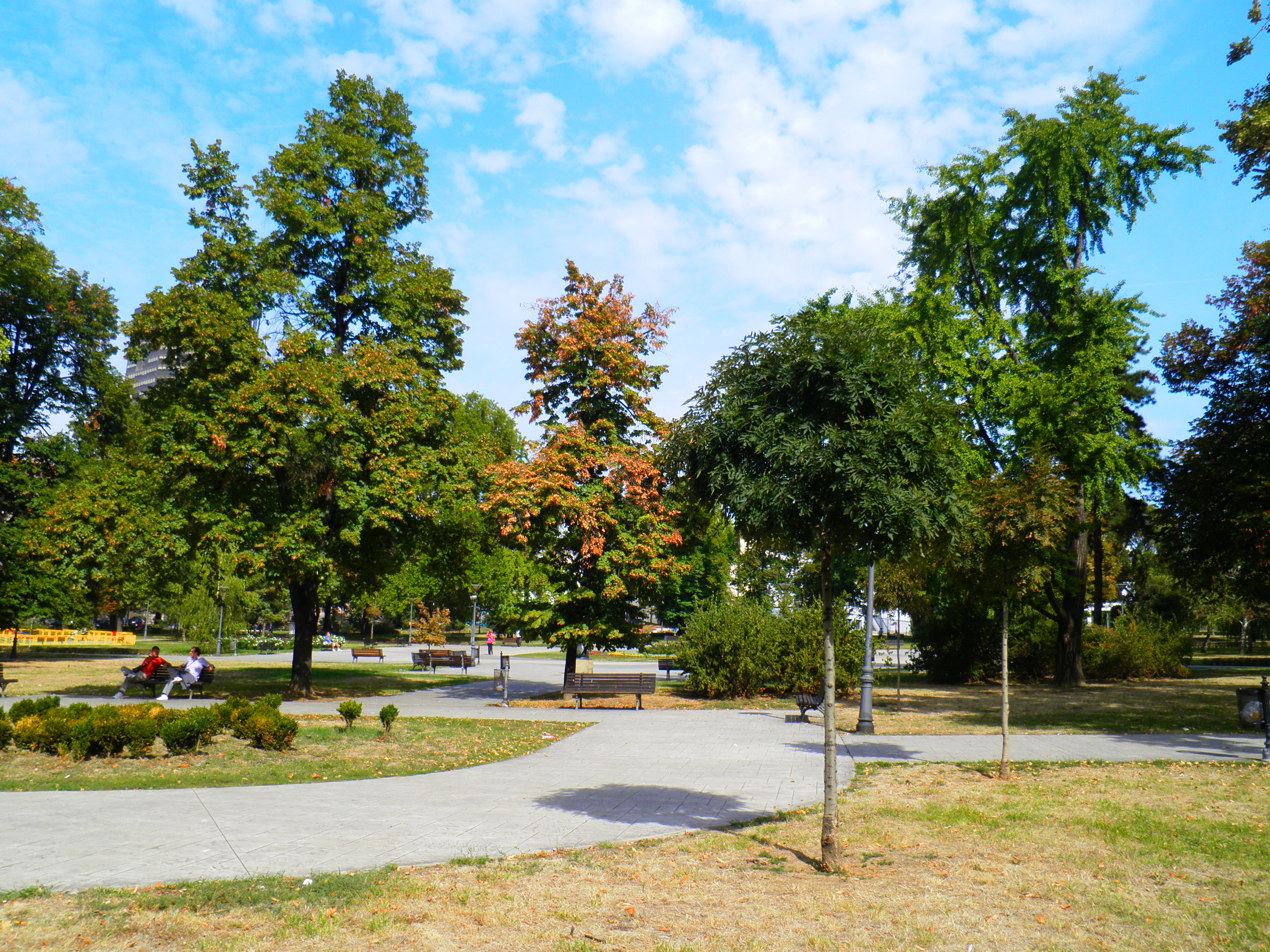
- Central section of the park

- Location within Belgrade
- Type: Classical style
- Location: Belgrade, Serbia
- Coordinates: 44.804721°N 20.463664°E
- Area: 26,457 m^{2} (284,780 sq ft)
- Created: 1931-1933
- Operator: City of Belgrade - Gradsko Zelenilo
- Status: Open all year

Manjež Park (Serbian: Мањеж) is a public park situated in the centre of Belgrade, the capital of Serbia.

== Location ==
Manjež is located close to downtown, in an area bounded by the Nemanjina (south), Resavska (west), Kralja Milana (north) and Svetozara Markovića streets (east). Northeast of the park is the small square of Cvetni Trg, to the east is the new Hilton Hotel, to the southeast are the kafana Manjež, building of the National Bank of Serbia and the Slavija Square behind it. West of the park are military buildings, including future location of the Belgrade City Museum, right across the park, and the Yugoslav Ministry of Defence building, partially demolished in the 1999 NATO bombing of Serbia.

== History ==
Modern park occupies the area which was a location of the Royal Cavalry Guard, or manjež (from the French manège), hence the name of the park. The compound originated from at least 1834, when Serbian building pioneer Nikola Živković (known as Hadži-Neimar), built the gunpowder magazine. In 1854 the magazine was relocated and the building of the Military Riding School was built instead, also after Živković's project. Horse stables were also built next to it.

The Belgrade City General Ordinance Plan of 1923 envisioned the creation of a park instead. The Royal Cavalry Guard occupied the site until 1931 when the construction of the park began. It was finished by 1933. The designer was Aleksandar Krstić, a pioneer of modern landscape architecture. The park is one of the few green areas within the city, built between the World wars in the classical style. It was originally named "His Majesty, Heir Apparent Peter.

In 2020, a society of Raška natives who live in Belgrade, "Milunka Savić", filed an initiative to the city assembly to erect the monument to Savić in the park. Milunka Savić was a combatant in the Balkan Wars and World War I (1912-1918), and one of the most decorated women soldiers in history, earning the moniker "Serbian Joan of Arc". City officials ignored the proposition.

In November 2021, city announced the project for the block between the park and the Slavija Square. It includes construction of the 14-storey high building at the corner of the Kralja Milana and Svetozara Markovića streets, right across the park's eastern corner. Central section of the block, parallel to the outer Kralja Milana and Nemanjina streets, will include green, pedestrian passage which would directly connect park to the concrete piazzetta at Slavija. City then unveiled its plan for public insight, but disregarded the project it just selected. A group of architects, art historians, activists, and Art Department of the Serbian Academy of Science and Art urged for the row of buildings along the Manjež park to be preserved, as they were planned for demolition. City responded that this area is not legally protected in any way, since 25 December 2020, when the preliminary protection for the West Vračar section of this area expired and was concluded that it is not worthy of full protection.

Architects Anđela Karabašević Sudžum and Vladislav Sudžum, who designed the 2021 project, withdrew, as the developer, Maison Royal company, asked for 32,800 m^{2} (353,000 sq ft) of total floor area above the ground (plus 15,500 m^{2} (167,000 sq ft) below), instead of the competition's proposed 21,000 m^{2} (230,000 sq ft), and they deemed it inappropriate for this location. By April 2023 most of the shops in this section were closed or relocated, giving the abandoned appearance to the neighborhood. Further controversy was sparked due to the developer itself, which is partially owned by the former footballer Dejan Stanković, and is known for the corruptive deals with city officials, and illegal, or after the fact permitted constructions.

On 17 August 2023, demolition of the block began. Demolished buildings include the Old Citizens Savings Bank (19th century; at the corner of Svetozara Markovića and Kralja Milana streets), Citizens Savings Bank (1929, by Stevan Tobolar; 43 Svetozara Markovića Street), and 1927 building by Milan Zloković at No. 47. All buildings have individual architectural values but are not protected. The 1934 building where the kafana "Manjež" was located will not be demolished as it is not on the lot awarded to the investor, so as a building at 26 Kralja Milutina Street, but this building is shown as demolished on the investors plan of the future area.

When the Belgrade Metro was originally planned, one of the underground stations was supposed to be beneath the park. After changes in the plans in the 2020s, the planned station was moved in the Slavija direction, under the Kralja Milana Street.

== Characteristics ==
The park has a regular rectangular shape. With two diagonal pathways, the park also functions as a significant corridor of pedestrian traffic. The park has an area of 26,457 m^{2} (284,780 sq ft) and a total of 253 trees of varying vitality. It accommodates several important sculptures, both commemorative and decorative.

When Serbia and Poland signed the cultural cooperation between Serbian Ministry of Culture and Polish Ministry of Culture and National Heritage in 2010, a statue of Frédéric Chopin, the Polish-French composer and pianist, was unveiled to mark the 200th anniversary of his birth, marked across the world that year.

=== Yugoslav Drama Theatre ===
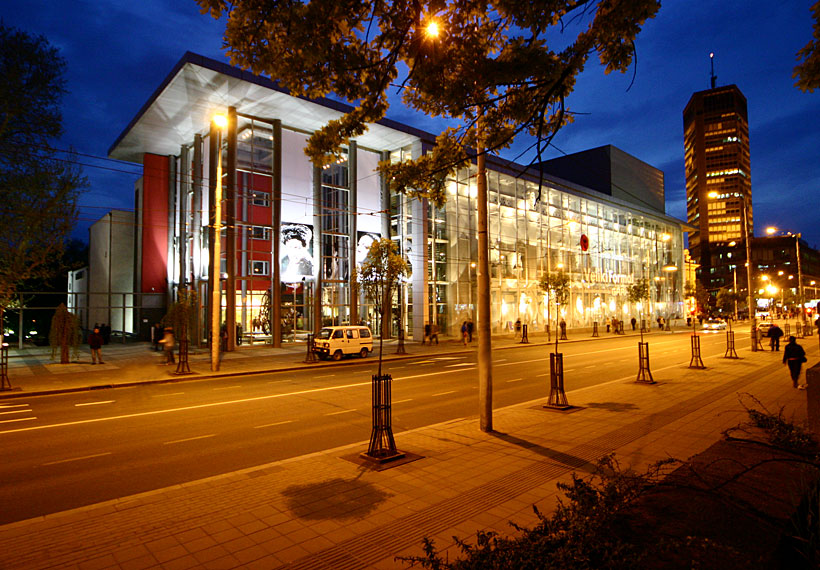
Yugoslav Drama Theatre at night

In the northern extension of the park is the Yugoslav Drama Theatre. It is on the location of the former stable of the Royal Cavalry It was a simple, two-story building, with elongated base, which became the home of the ensemble of the National Theatre in Belgrade, because the main building was damaged during the World War I. The first performance was held in January 1920. In July 1922 the building of the National Theatre was reconstructed but the old stable, popularly known as "Wooden manège" continued to serve as a theatre until 1927 the building burned to the ground. In this period it was known as the "Theatre at Cvetni Trg".

The construction of the new building began that same year. After the plan designed by the prominent Russian architect, Nikolay Krasnov, the new building was financed by the shareholders' funds. Academically conceived, the main façade was enlivened by the series of decorative architectural elements and allegoric sculptures, by the author Vojislav Ratimirović Šikoparija, a Belgrade sculptor. The last temporary Assembly building was commissioned from 1931 until 1936. From 1929 until 1931, it served as the theatre building ("The building on Vračar") when the interior of the building was altered due to the temporary moving in of the National Assembly. The adaptation of building into the theatre was finished in 1947, projected by Momčilo N. Belobrk. The theatre burned again on 17 October 1997, due to the bad wirings, and was reopened as a highly modernized building with restored much of the old exterior, on 23 May 2003.

=== Kafana Manjež ===
Kafana Manjež is located just across the Svetozara Markovića street. The original kafana was opened in 1922 under the name Kod tetka Jele ("Aunt Jela's"). In 1936 it changed name after the newly built park. For decades, the traditional Serbian kafana was considered quite a distinguished venue, visited by artists, politicians, politicians, officers and foreigners. The violinist Stefan Milenković named Manjež the "true Serbian kafana and soul of the city" while actor Rade Šerbedžija called it "a mirror of old, beautiful Belgrade, the one I wish to remember it". Still, the kafana was modernized in 2007 with the international cuisine added to the menu, it was even closed in 2013 and revived as a modern restaurant and hotel "Manjež Exclusive Villa".

As the venue was a collateral for the credit which wasn't paid off, in September 2018 the Expobank activated the mortgage insurance and the restaurant was listed for sale. When city announced reconstruction of this area in 2021, which should include demolition of certain buildings, citizens protested against the possible demolition of the kafana. City responded that the building where the venue is located will not be demolished.

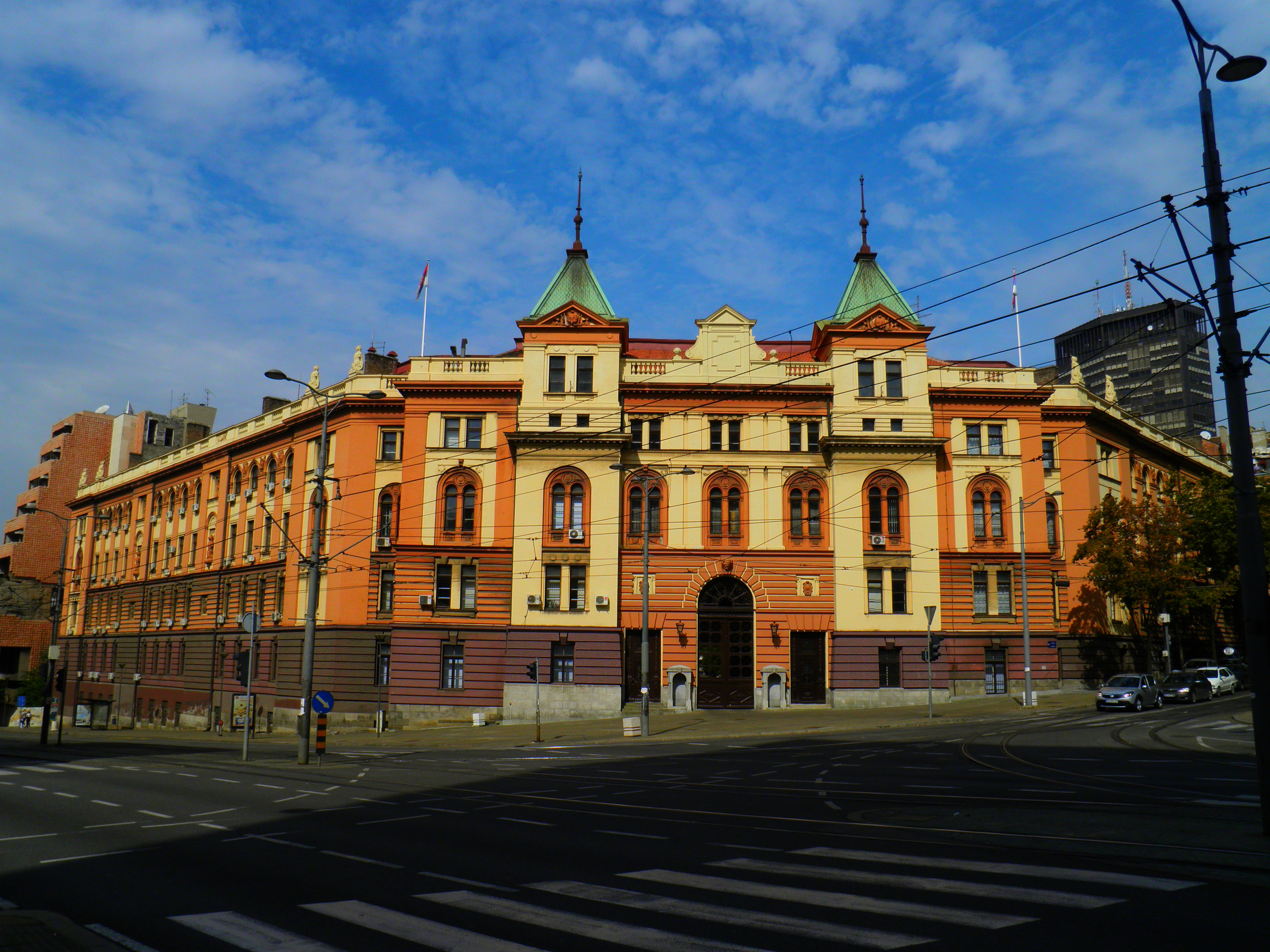
Barrack of the 7th Regiment

=== Barrack of the 7th Regiment ===
Across the entire lower section of the park, along the Resavska Street, is the Barrack of the 7th Regiment building. The representative edifice was built in 1899 after the design of Dragutin Đorđević. Originally, it served as the military barrack. Built during the rule of Alexander Obrenović, the building was considered one of the most beautiful in Belgrade at the time, and hosted the elite guards unit. It was "the pride of the throne" and was meant to celebrate the power of the Serbian army and its loyalty to the dynasty. However, it was the guards unit from this very barrack which conducted the May Coup in 1903 when the Obrenović dynasty was dethroned and King Alexander and Queen Draga were executed.

The building was located in the Military Quarter of Belgrade, which stretched between the streets of Kneza Miloša, Kralja Milana, Birčaninova and the Slavija Square. The quarter included the buildings of the Serbian General Staff, Military Academy, Officers Storehouse, Officers House and the Royal Cavalry Guard training ground, or the modern park area. In terms of architecture, Đorđević implemented the style of the German Ritter barracks. Hence, above the entry nigh arch of the cart gate there are two square-shaped towers. The entire entry section is indented, leaving a small piazetta where the musters can be organized. The façade is ornamented with the sculptures symbolizing knights in armours or coats of arms. During the Interbellum, the 7th Regiment was situated in it. In 1927 Ministry of the Army decided to upgrade the edifice by adding the third floor. They hired architect Blažo Vukićević Sarap, even though the original designer Đorđević was still alive.

A square-located structure, the academism-style building has three street façades and inner yard. The frontage is dominated by the vaulted portal, and two symmetrical avant-corps shaped like square towers with domes towering over the roof construction. Façade is further enhanced by the semi-circular windows on the first floor, ornamental, separating garlands and ornaments shaped like heraldic cartouches with Kingdom of Serbia's coats of arms. To further augment military function of the building, there are additional façade ornaments shaped like armors or shields. The building was declared a cultural monument in 1992.

== Sources ==
- Park Manjež Milanović Hranislav, SCIndeks
