= Balkanska Street =

Street in Belgrade, Serbia

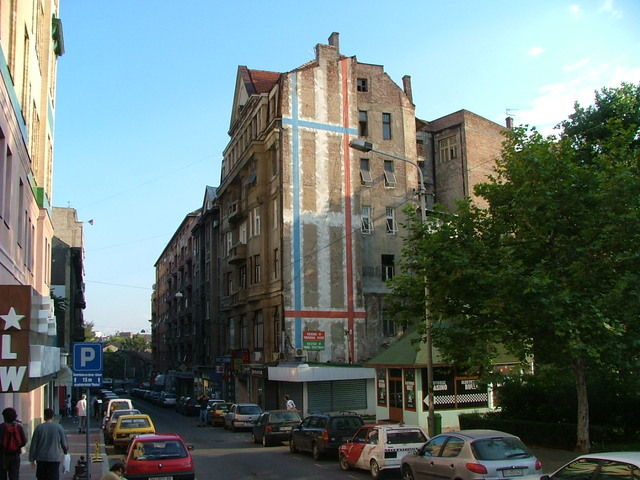
- Balkanska Street's upper section in August 2004.
- Interactive map of Balkanska Street
- Native name: Балканска улица (Serbian)
- Namesake: Balkans
- Length: 700 m (2,300 ft)
- Location: Stari Grad and Savski Venac

Construction
- Inauguration: 1872

Balkanska Street (Serbian Cyrillic: Балканска улица / Balkanska ulica, transl. Balkan Street) is a street in downtown Belgrade, the capital of Serbia. It is one of the most recognizable streets in the city and one of the oldest still bearing its original name since the first official naming of the city streets in 1872. It is located in the municipalities of Stari Grad and Savski Venac. It has been described as "one of the most popular downtown streets, where the past and present dwell simultaneously", and one of Belgrade's liveliest streets.

As the shortest route between the Belgrade Main railway station and downtown, for decades it was used by the passengers and visitors and, as the first street of Belgrade they would encounter, it was labeled as an "unofficial main transit thoroughfare of Belgrade immigrants". Due to its inclination, it was described as the "Belgrade's best known uphill".

== Location ==
Balkanska originates at the Terazije Square, sole center of Belgrade. Its entire course, some 700 meters, is in the southern direction. It receives a short Pajsijeva street from the right and then crosses the Kraljice Natalije street, where it leaves the municipality of Stari Grad and enters Savski Venac. It then receives the Lomina street from the right and passes through the intersection where it crosses the streets of Gavrila Principa, Admirala Geprata and Milovana Milovanovića. It ends at the meeting with the Nemanjina Street, though its natural extension is the Hajduk Veljkov Venac and further, Sarajevska street.

== History ==
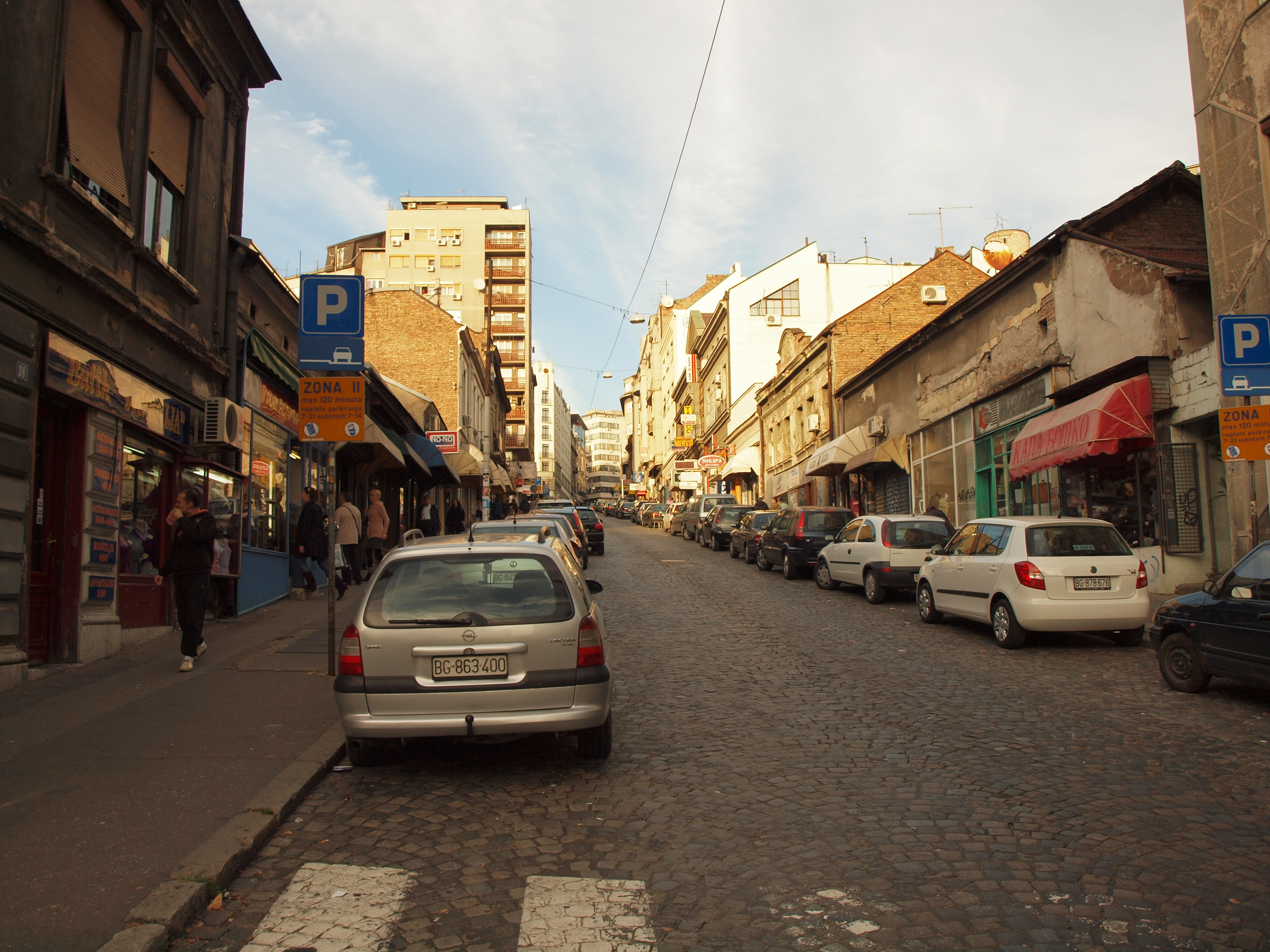
Lower section of the street in November 2010.

The street was constructed in 1872, when it got its name it still bears today. Originally, it was routed as a connection between the Abadžijska (modern Kraljice Natalije) and Savamalska (modern Gavrila Principa) streets. This entire section of the city was projected by the Viennese architect Franz Janke. First proper building in the street was built in 1876, at the corner with the Abadžijska. In 1885, a tailor (abadžija) Đorđe Arsenijević opened his tailor store in that building and placed a plastered relief of a scissors on the building's front façade. As it was prolonged on both sides, it became the direct, and shortest, connection between downtown and Savamala, on the bank of the Sava river. In the 19th century, Balkanska was famous for its artisan shops: tailors, waxers, opančari, quilters. In the 20th century it became known for the food, as a location of some of the best pastries in Belgrade, especially known for its ice-creams and halva. At the top of the street one of the first fast-food facilities in Belgrade was open, "Leskovčanin", which used to sell Leskovačka pljeskavica. In general, Balkanska was a place where you could buy almost any type of goods. Today, only few of the old craftsman's shops survived, like pastry shops and bakeries, but as of 2015, the tanner shop, hat maker or purse tailor can still be found in the street. Some of the oldest, still operational shops are bakery "Anđelko" (est. 1920), purse tailor "Zlatko" (est. 1946) and hatter "Kapa Rade" (est. c.1949). In the 1960s, the street was known for the illegal street traders who were selling "the best English fabrics".

In order the preserve the craftsmanship for which the street was known, city government announced in July 2017 the project of adapting the Balkanska into the "street of the old crafts", not only as a tourist attraction but as a way of keeping the "spirit of Belgrade". In April 2018 it was announced that the small shops in the street will be reconstructed, the façades will be renovated and those which are empty will be offered to the artisans from other parts of the city. The reconstruction began on 10 July 2018 and is expected to last until 15 October. The asphalt concrete will be removed from the street completely and replaced with the stone slabs on the sidewalks while the street itself will be paved with cobblestone, like it was before. After the reconstruction is complete, the street will be declared a "special tourist zone".

However, the works dragged on, an in October it was evident that they will be finished only in 2019. The digging of the street actually damaged the business of the remaining craft shops. some of them losing up to 80% of revenue and considering, at least temporary closing of the business. The deadline was then moved to 1 December and then to 7 December, and that only for the lower half of the street, while the frequent complete absence of workers was noticeable. City promised that it will not charge the rent to those shops which are renting the government and city owned facilities and that entrepreneurs will be free of paying taxes during the extended reconstruction, however several artisan shops were closed. The upper section of the street remained unreconstructed and by 2020 city went silent on refurbishment of the façades or creation of the vintage zone. In January 2021 city administration reiterated intentions of restoring artisan shops, stating they can't find old trades craftsmen.

== Geography ==
Major physical feature, by which Balkanska is best known, is its continual steepness, from the beginning to the end. It connects central city plateau, located on the top of Terazije ridge, with the Sava bank and Savamala neighborhood. As Savamala is location of the Belgrade Main railway station, Belgrade Main Bus Station and the Sava port, for over a century Balkanska was the first part of Belgrade travelers would see as it is the shortest way to reach downtown. In the latest decades that changed, though, as none of the public transportation lines go through the Balkanska due to its narrowness.

Entire underground is rich in groundwater which flow under the entire course of the street. When and underground garage was built on Zeleni Venac, an entire underground lake was discovered.

== Architecture ==
Most of the buildings in Balkanska originate from the 1920s and 1930s, with beautiful façades which are mostly in bad shape due to the lack of maintenance.

During the bombing of Belgrade in World War II, a block of buildings in the upper section of the street, below the Hotel Moskva, was demolished. The empty space remained until the 2020s. When reconstruction of the street began in the late 2010s, and with constant announcements by the city regarding the proper arrangement of the Terazijska Terasa which will open view from lower, river neighborhoods to Terazije and top of the Balkanska Street, citizens proposed the complete rebuilding of the demolished edifices. There are enough archival records and photos for that.

== Characteristics ==
Upper section of the street is paved, while the lower one is still covered with cobblestone.

Beginning and the upper part of the street is the location of the Hotel Moskva, Terazijska Terasa, Terazije fountain and Hotel Prag. There is also an underground passage which connects it to the city's main street, Kralja Milana. Also, the upper course of Balkanska is the easternmost border of the neighborhoods of Zeleni Venac and Savamala. One of the most popular places in the street was a cinema "20th October", now defunct. Ending section is a location of the Hotel Beograd and Park Gavrilo Princip.

The "20th October" was one of the iconic cinemas in Belgrade, a "profane temple number one" for every filmophile. Journalist and Belgrade chronicler Bogdan Tirnanić described it as the "last stand of people's art". On 13 July 1968, a bomb exploded during the showing of The Upper Hand. One spectator was killed (Savo Čučurević) and over 80 were injured, including a student Magdalena Novaković, who got both of her legs amputated. Terrorist Miljenko Hrkać was persecuted for this and other bombings, and executed in 1978.

It is known as one of the "most popular streets in Belgrade".
