= Gavrilo Princip Park =

Public park in Belgrade, Serbia

- Парк Гаврила Принципа
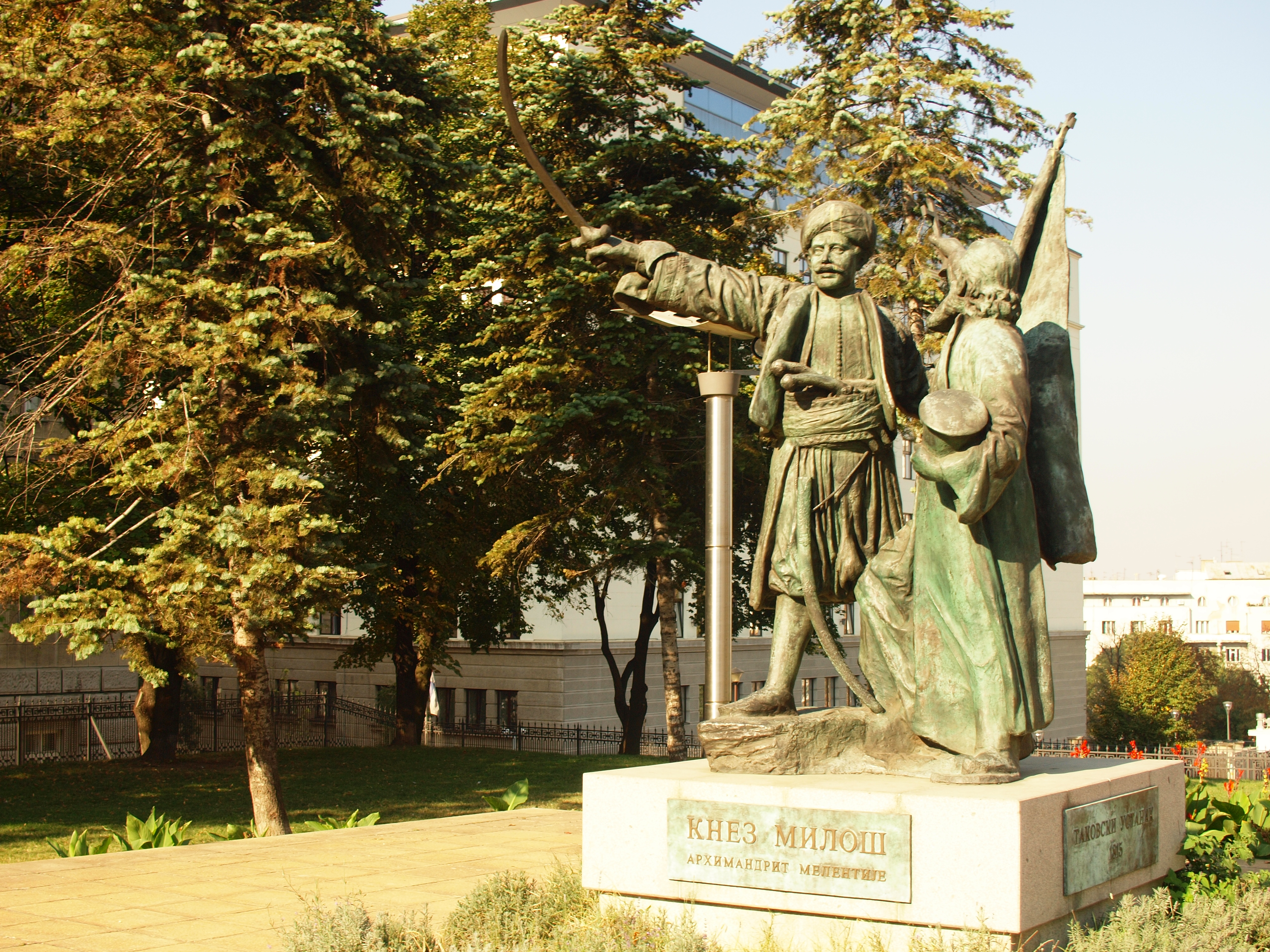
- Monument to Prince Miloš

- Location within Belgrade
- Location: Savski Venac, Belgrade
- Coordinates: 44.807539°N 20.459557°E
- Open: All year

Gavrilo Princip Park (Serbian: Парк Гаврила Принципа, romanized: Park Gavrila Principa) is a park in Belgrade, the capital of Serbia. Originating from 1836, it is one of the oldest parks in the city and in 1864 it was declared the first public park in Belgrade. Named Financial Park until 2017, it is located in the municipality of Savski Venac.

== Location ==
Gavrilo Princip Park is located in the northern part of Savski Venac. It stretches between the streets of Kneza Miloša on the east, Admirala Geprata on the north, Balkanska on the west and Nemanjina on the south. It is embedded between the buildings of the Government of the Republic of Serbia, Finance Ministry and Supreme Court of Cassation.

== Name and history ==
Residence of prince Miloš in downtown Belgrade was located across the Cathedral Church, where the Patriarchal See of the Serbian Orthodox Church is today. As Turks were still residing in the Belgrade Fortress, in order to move further away from them, prince Miloš began building another residence on 25 August 1829. He has chosen an uninhabited area along the Topčider road, modern Kneza Miloša street. The residence, planned as the sojourn for his sons Milan and Mihailo, was finished in 1836 and included a large garden, nucleus of the future park. The building had one floor, it was long and spacious, built in the typical architectural style of the day and faced towards the Sava river. Prince used it to entertain his foreign guests.

Surviving documentation shows that the park was built in the "English style" and cost 10,245 Groschen. At that time, inhabitants of Belgrade called the garden Sovetski Park (Council's Park), as it was closed for the general public and only the government ministers and counselors were allowed into it. After both princes, Miloš in 1839 and his son Mihailo in 1842, went into exile, both the residence and the garden were handed over to the state which in turn vested it to the Finance Ministry, so gradually it became known as the Financial Park. Prince Mihailo, who returned to the throne in 1860, in July 1864 declared the Financial Park a "people's park", that is, the first public park in Belgrade.

The park was in the vicinity of the military complex situated along and around the Topčider road. Army orchestra known as the Military Band, performed every Sunday in the park. After the Ottomans withdrew from Belgrade Fortress, their last hold in Belgrade, the fortress was placed under the military jurisdiction and the band's performances were relocated there, too.

Parts of park were demolished in time. In 1889 for the building where the modern Finance Ministry is located, and in 1926 when construction of the present building of the Government began. Park was hit in the German bombing of Belgrade in 1941. Even though the modern park is on its original location, its present appearance originates completely from the period after World War II. The park covers an area of 1.95 hectares (4.8 acres) today. It went through a complete reconstruction in 2004, after which a monument to prince Miloš was erected in the park. Another refurbishment ensued in 2011 and in 2015 a monument to Gavrilo Princip was constructed. On 18 April 2017, Belgrade City Assembly officially changed its name to Gavrilo Princip Park.

In January 2021, demolition of the building at 14 Admirala Geprata, which separates the park from this street, was announced. New, planned building will have "transparent" ground floor, which would allow view on the Hammam of Prince Miloš and northern section of the park. The hammam itself will be reconstructed and adapted into the cultural center. Also planned is an underground garage below the park.

== Monument to Prince Miloš ==
Marking ten year anniversary of Boris Kidrič's death, a monument dedicated to him was placed in the park in 1963. It was sculptured by Nikola Jovanović. One of the leaders of Slovenian partisans in World War II, and Josip Broz Tito's close collaborator Kidrič was appointed de facto Yugoslav minister of economy in 1948. After the Tito–Stalin split in 1948, and the ensuing Informbiro period, alleging that the Serbia as the Yugoslavia's east might be occupied by the Soviet Union, he started to transfer entire factories from Serbia to the western parts of the state, including the much more developed Slovenia. This included the equipment, experts, workers, licenses, technical documentation, industrial knowledge and technology.

There was some opposition from the workers, but it was suppressed, and Kidrič remained disliked in Serbia. This move has been criticized even during the Communism. Tito felt differently, so after Kidrič's premature death from cancer in 1953, at 41, he decided to memorialize his name. First, the Beogradska Street in downtown was renamed to Borisa Kidriča Street, and the Institute for examination of the structure of matter was renamed The Institute for Nuclear Sciences Boris Kidrič. Ten years later the monument was finally placed.

Dislike for him in Belgrade and Serbia remained, so Borisa Kidriča was among the first streets which changed names after the fall of Communism when the former name, Beogradska, was reinstated in 1991. That same year, decision was made to rename the institute to Vinča Institute of Nuclear Sciences. In the fall of 1996, the monument was removed from the park and relocated to the Museum of Contemporary Art in Ušće. There were some opposing voices, stating that Belgrade shouldn't do what many post-Communist states and cities have done, to indiscriminately remove all monuments from the former period. However, the decision in the Belgrade Assembly was unanimous, an extremely rare situation in the 1990s, that both the regime and opposition vote for the same decision.

The pedestal was left in the park, so that it could be used for the new monument. There were several suggestions, and finally it was proposed that Prince Miloš should get a monument, as he had none, and the street where the location is, was named after him. Municipality of Savski Venac proposed this in 1996, but for the next eight years, the paperwork rested in some drawer. It was finally decided to place the monument after the massive reconstruction of the park in 2004. It was decided to use replica of Petar Ubavkić's composition originally sculptured for the 1900 Paris World Fair.

Named Takovo Uprising, it represented the prince and archimandrite Hadži Melentije. For ideologial reasons, this monument has been cut in pieces after World War II, but the pieces were kept. In 1981 the monument was reconstructed, and in 1990 it was placed in Takovo. The replica was dedicated in the park on 26 September 2004, and placed on the pedestal remaining from the Kidrič's monument.
