= Jat Airways Hotels =

Serbian Hotel Chain

- Јат Хотели; Jat Hoteli
- Slavija Hotels from outside

- Location within Belgrade

General information
- Location: Belgrade, Serbia
- Coordinates: 44°48′7.2″N 20°28′0.8″E

Jat Airways Hotels are a chain of hotels in Serbia. The hotel chain was once subsidiary of the national airline of Serbia – Jat Airways which rebranded to Air Serbia in 2013. It is still a partner of the airline and held the name of the former airline for a while, but was later renamed back to the Slavija Hotel Belgrade.

== Locations ==
=== Slavija Hotel Belgrade ===
In Belgrade there are three Jat Airways Hotels. All are called Slavija hotels as they are located on the Slavija Square in the city centre. The Slavija hotel complex contains three buildings. The tallest one being a 3 star hotel, a second smaller 2 star hotel where groups of children on school excursions usually stay and "Hotel Slavija Lux" – a 5 star all glass hotel. All hotels except the 2 star hotel have both apartments and smaller rooms. Hotel Slavija Lux is popular with famous people staying in Belgrade.

In front of the hotels there is a stop for a special bus line directly to Belgrade Nikola Tesla Airport.

Hotels were separated from the JAT company in 2005. All three hotels became controlled by the government until a suitable buyer was found in 2007.

==== Slavija Lux ====
In 1988, the management of the Slavija hotel signed a contract with the Kin Stib company, owned by George Jablan. The management was obliged to obtain necessary permits for gambling ("live games"), but the legal gambling regulations changed so the hotel failed to do so. According to the management, in the next 7 annexes of the contract, they settled everything with Jablan and that final annex, from 1998, confirms there is no debt. By the 8th annex, from 2000, Branislav Šaranović, a collaborator of Jablan (who was assassinated in 1998) and owner of the "Fil Šar" company from Vienna, Austria, entered the gambling business in the hotel. The management claims that he didn't invest a dime and in 2005, after another change of regulations, hotel quit on the gambling completely. At that point, Šaranović sued the state because of that, but lost the case.

Šaranović, a crime boss involved in drugs, thefts and executions, was assassinated in 2009. His widow, Katarina Šaranović, initiated the arbitration at the Serbian Chamber of Commerce in 2011 but she didn't pay the fees, so the case was dismissed. Šaranović restated her claim in 2015, paid the late fees, and asked for $2 million with interest. Without any proceedings, just based on her statement, the Chamber ruled in her favor in 2016. The ruling can't be appealed at the Chamber, but can at the regular courts. The hotel appealed the Commerce Court in March 2017 asking for the annulment of the Chamber's decision.

The debt collector (in Serbia called "public executor") announced an auction for the "Slavija Lux" building. The hotel complained asking for the delay of auction to July 2017, citing the ongoing case at the Commerce Court and additionally sued the members of the Arbitrary Commission of the Chamber. The collector set the auction for December 2017 and rejected the complaint on 3 January 2018, after 7 months and a warning from the Court of Appeals and organized the auction prior to the court's ruling on the hotel's complaint. The auction was held on 16 January 2018, and the only bidder was the Serbian "meat king", Petar Matijević who purchased the hotel for €6.5 million. He paid the amount but had to accept the provision that the sale is not closed until the court issues its final ruling on the matter. The hotel sent another complaint and on 22 January 2018 the court voided the transaction because it wasn't legally established if there is really a debt to "Fil Šar", hence the hotel couldn't be sold. The final ruling is still being awaited.

==== Privatization ====
In October 2023 the government announced second attempt at selling hotels, this time all of them, not just the Lux. Matijević's son, Bojan Matijević in the name of family's Mat Real Estate company, stated they are still interested. The hotel complex was then sold the Mat Real Estate for €25 million, and the contract was officially signed with the government on 17 January 2024.

=== Kopaonik ===
The Jat Apartments Kopaonik Hotel was built in the 1980s and is among the largest hotels within the Kopaonik hotels complex in Kopaonik ski resort.

=== Vršac ===
The Jat Airways hotel in Vršac is located within the Jat Airways Flight Academy. The capacity of the hotel is 120 beds. The hotel is only 20 minutes walking distance from Vršac Airport and usually houses trainees at the flight academy.
