= Slavija Square =

Major commercial junction in Belgrade, Serbia

- Трг Славија
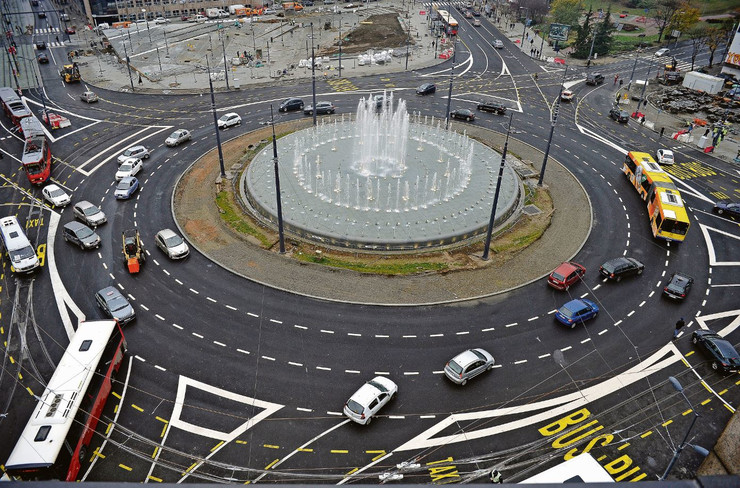
- The busy roundabout on Slavija Square
- Location: Vračar, Belgrade, Serbia
- Location within Belgrade
- Coordinates: 44.8025°N 20.4664°E

Slavija Square (Serbian: Трг Славија, Trg Slavija) is a major commercial junction between the intersections of Kralja Milana, Beogradska, Makenzijeva, Svetosavska, Bulevar oslobođenja, Deligradska and Nemanjina streets in Belgrade. The square was previously named Dimitrije Tucović Square, after the prominent Serbian socialist.

== Location ==
Slavija is located less than 1.5 km (0.93 mi) south of Terazije (downtown Belgrade), at an altitude of 117 m (384 ft). The square itself belongs entirely to the municipality of Vračar, though the municipality of Savski Venac borders directly to the west. The Slavija neighborhood, which surrounds the neighborhoods of Cvetni Trg in the north, Grantovac and Krunski Venac in the north and north-east, and Englezovac and Savinac in the south-east, all in Vračar. The Manjež park is to the north, while West Vračar is to the west, both in Savski Venac.

== History ==
=== 19th century ===
Until the 1880s, the area around Slavija was a large pool on the eastern outskirts of the city. The pond was naturally drained by the Vračarski potok, down the modern Nemanjina street, into the Gypsy Pond in the neighborhood of Savamala. The remnant of the pond is the large underground water spring, under the modern Hotel Slavija. The earth from the top of the Vračar hill, above the Slavija, was used to cover and drain the pond, in turn flattening the hill and creating the modern Vračar plateau. The formation of the square started when a well-known Scottish businessman and Nazarene Francis Mackenzie, bought a large piece of land above the present square and parcelled it for sale (the area became subsequently known as Englezovac). Soon after that, Mackenzie built a house for himself at Slavija (at the place where the old "Slavija" cinema used to be), which, in 1910 was turned into the Socialist People's Center, a gathering place of the worker's movement. The other, smaller buildings at the corner of Kralja Milana and the square, where the famous cafés "Tri seljaka" and "Rudničanin" used to be, were destroyed before and during World War II.

Today demolished, the original inn, later hotel "Slavija" was built from 1882 to 1888. The hotel's kafana became one of the best known in Belgrade. The venue had a big hall for the parties and balls, and a spacious summer, open-air garden. The hotel hosted recitals, theatrical shows and choirs performances. The large object gave name to its surroundings, and then to the entire neighborhood. Word "Slavija" itself is a generic term for land inhabited by the Slavs.

=== 20th century ===
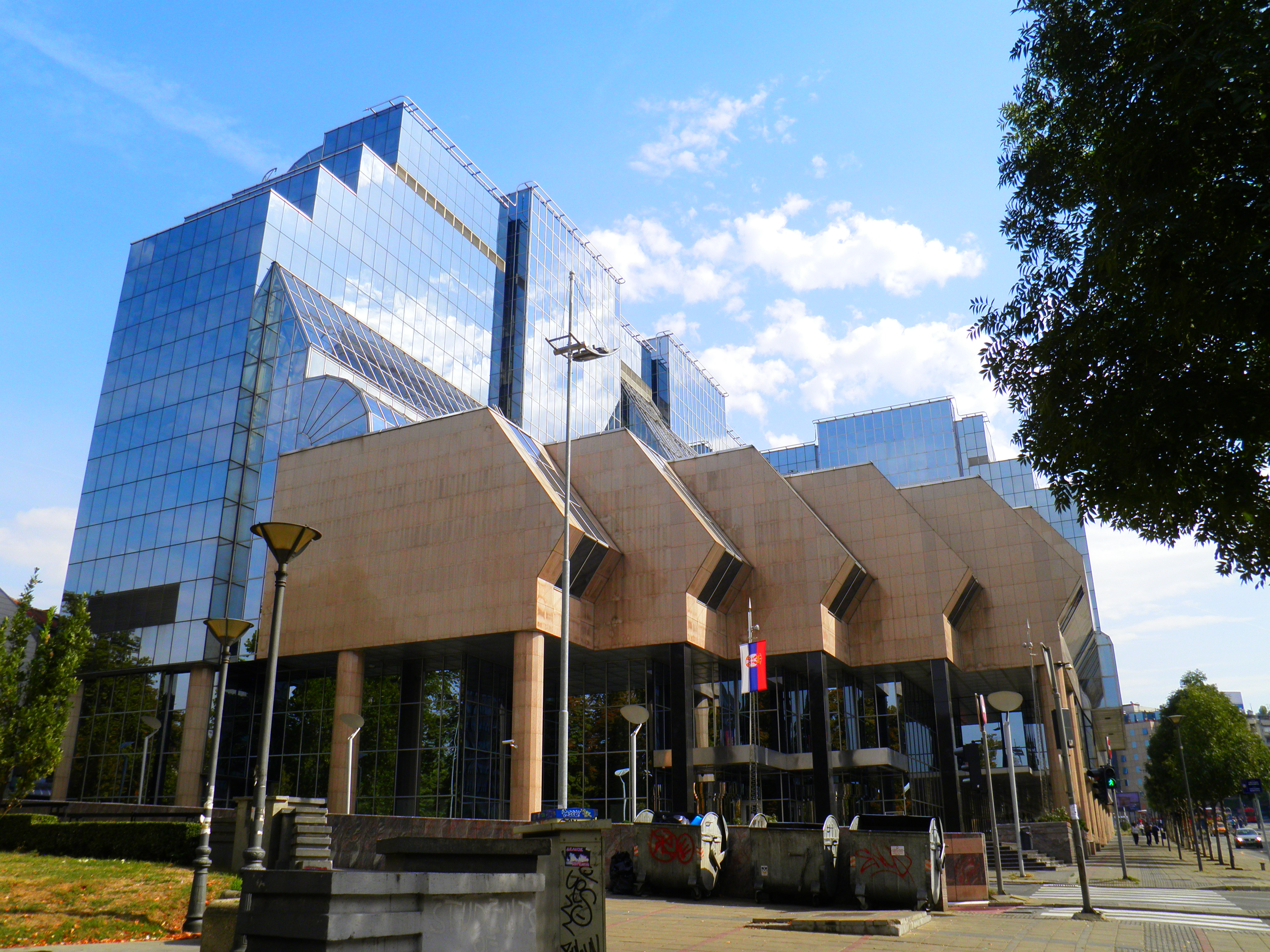
National Bank of Serbia headquarters

Until World War II Slavija remained an unregulated crossroad of eight streets, which crossed at different angles. Surrounding was an entangled web of small streets which, though cobblestoned in the early 20th century, were remains of the old, dirt paths dating from the Ottoman period. However, the plans in the late Interbellum included almost complete makeover of Slavija, with construction of numerous important buildings, including the Belgrade Opera House and the "Mitić Tower", the largest department store and the tallest building in the Southeast Europe. All plans, including some foundations already laid, were cut by the outbreak of World War II in 1941.

German occupational forces concluded that the traffic flow rate in Slavija was too low and that it obstructed transportation. City government, part of the Quisling administration in Serbia, was entrusted with the task of conducting construction plans for Slavija devised in Germany. Massive works, headed by engineer Maksimović, began in the fall of 1942. Apart from transforming Slavija into the proper roundabout, underground works were also conducted. A major effluent sewer (sewage collector) was built, which collected wastewater and groundwater from the hills of Vračar and Zvezdara. The sewer further conducted the water under the Nemanjina Street into the Sava river. As of 2022, the roundabout, sewer and its outlet into the river still function. In the 21st century, the massive size of the sewer and large pipes are major obstacles for the construction of the projected underground passages around Slavija.

After World War II, the new communist regime renamed the square in 1947 in honor of prominent socialist figure, Dimitrije Tucović and placed a bronze bust of Tucović at the central square plateau. The bust, work of Stevan Bodnarov, was placed in 1949. In the early 2000s it was officially changed back to Slavija.

Hotel Slavija was built in 1962, and enlarged later (complex Slavija A and Slavija B). A third addition, the ultra modern Slavija Lux was built in 1989.

=== Projects ===
For decades, architects, urbanists and city authorities can't decide how to reconstruct and adapt the square. Over the time, many public competitions were held for the best solutions, labeling it sometimes as a “haunted square”. Architects always pointed out that the traffic function is the most important and that it has to be addresses first, and then to plan the surroundings and also that Slavija was to be envisioned as a whole and not to be fixed partially, because sum of the parts does not make a whole. Some of the projects were quite over-ambitious and exotic:

- 1982 – Design competition for the building of the communal-business center in the Slavija-Svetozara Markovića-Nemanjina-Kralja Milana section. It resulted in the construction of the National Bank of Serbia's building, designed by Grujo Golijanin and finished only in 2006.
- 1992 – Projects for the construction on the location of the Mitićeva Rupa.
- 1993 – Project of the business center "Slavija" by Slobodan Mića Rajović, which served as the basis for the regulatory plan for the Slavija-Svetog Save-Krušedolska-Tiršova-Katićeva-Boulevard of Liberation block. Barely and partially executed.
- 2004 – Project envisioned a monument to the "modern Serbia" instead of the monument to Dimitrije Tucović. New monument was to be a cylindrical glass construction of the same height as the neighboring hotel "Slavija". Inside the construction a panoramic elevator was predicted which would reach the lookout at the top. Lyrics of the "Himna slobode" (Hymn to the Liberty) were planned to be written on the inside walls of the glass monument. City even provided the funds for the project, but the project was ultimately rejected, with the official explanation that the public was against it.
- 2005 – Architects Tamara Petrović & Miloš Komlenić; central part of the roundabout was to be the location of a sun clock. Roofed square in the section in front of the National Bank was planned with commercial area below the roof and an underground passage to the metro. It was a basis for the detailed regulatory plan for Mitićeva Rupa, envisioned as the mixed commercial-residential-public complex. Only in 2021 it was open for public consideration but was never adopted.
- 2006 – Energoprojekt's project envisioned Slavija as the pedestrian zone, while the traffic was to be lowered two floors underground. New symbol of Slavija was planned, a 150 meters tall tower.
- 2006 – Conceptual design for the Kralja Milana-Kralja Milutina-Njegoševa-Svetozara Markovića blok, by Igor Marić and Božidar Manić. Included a large business and commercial building. After developing the project with Bojan Zabukovac, Aleksandar Sudžuković and Zoran Mrvaljević, it resulted in the hotel "Hilton" which followed the original design.
- 2008 – Belgrade's Institute for urbanism rehashed the 2005 project, but mostly concentrated on the traffic. Instead of reconstructing the entire square, the Institute adopted a plan to do it block by block. Project also included the construction of two commercial 8-stories buildings, shopping mall and an entrance to the underground garage and a future metro station, on the location of the former cinema Slavija. In front of the National Bank a shallow pool with a sculpture in it was projected and the green zone around it. The fountain would "react" to the emotions of the pedestrians through the special sensors.
- 2012 – Project envisioned the transfer of the pedestrian traffic in the network of tunnels, in an effort to quicken the car traffic on the ground level. Trolleybuses and trams were to be relocated to the rim of the roundabout. Plan also has foreseen the removal of the remains of Dimitrije Tucović and construction of the large fountain instead, covering the entire island within the roundabout. Based on it, city developed a detailed regulatory plan in 2015, but without pedestrian underground passages.

=== 2016–2018 reconstruction ===
After the political changes in the city government in 2013, new city authorities decided to adopt the 2012 project, with some changes. They abandoned the idea of the underground pedestrian passages and instead plan to displace the existing zebra crossings 50 to 100 meters further from the roundabout. They kept the fountain on the central island of the roundabout which was to be a musical fountain with a diameter of 32 meters and the water jets 16 meters high.

Criticism from the architects was directed to the fact that transportation solutions will not speed up the traffic flow, the needlessness of the fountain on such a place, and that, in general, new city government removed from the project the best parts and kept the worst. Traffic experts pointed out that the displacement of the pedestrian crossings won't help the traffic and that it will be less safe for the pedestrians themselves. Also, as Belgrade is known for its strong winds, the water from such a high jet streams would constantly wet the pavement of the square. City government replied that the fountain will have wind sensors. Architect Dragoljub Bakić said that both the project, and the execution which followed, are of the "horribly low quality". Actually, the area of the already busy roundabout is reduced by one lane during the reconstruction.

==== Fountain ====
Construction of the fountain began on 3 December 2016. As a response to the constant criticism about the fountain, including that it will be completely surrounded by some of the busiest traffic in the city, thus inaccessible to the pedestrians, and a price which is, for the Serbian economic conditions deemed way to high for such a construction (214 million dinars or some 1.75 million euros), Belgrade's city manager Goran Vesić stated that those who do not like the musical fountain don't have to listen to it. On 13 November 2016 the bust of Dimitrije Tucović was removed and on 15 December 2016 his remains were reinterred into the Alley of the Greats in Belgrade's New Cemetery. Surviving members of Tucović family weren't present, while their wishes to bury Tucović in his home village of Gostilje and to relocate the bust to the town of Užice were ignored. A smaller version of Tucović bust was placed at his tomb.

In March 2017, the city's Transportation Secretariat sent a memo in which warned that the project is not adjusted for such a major traffic section. The secretariat warned that the planned dispersion of the water will make the roads wet and slippery in summer and create ice in winter, as it is supposed to work throughout the year, thanks to the special heaters. They concluded that the fountain projected that way is not suitable for the highly frequent roundabout but rather for the parks and open green areas and that it can endanger the traffic. Ban on further construction was suggested if the inadequacies are not fixed. The solution turned out to be a changed direction of the sprinklers, 74 out of 458, within the fountain.

Lit with 400 spotlights, the fountain was opened on 6 June 2017, after a month of delay, and at the final cost of 254 million dinars (2,06 million euros), with taxes. The traffic policemen who manage the traffic on Slavija now wear the traditional white uniforms. As the fountain is unreachable, Vesić stated that the new park, across the fountain, will be a place where the "citizens will gather, watch at the fountain and take photos of it".

Experts' criticism of the fountain continued. During the trials in the days before it was officially opened, music was played all day (after the opening it is several hours before noon and several in the evening) and was indeed too loud - it was heard several blocks away. Local residents called both the communal inspection and the communal police, but they both declared themselves incompetent. Milan Vujanić, professor at the University of Belgrade's Faculty of Transport and Traffic Engineering, asserted that the fountain is still a safety risk. Architect Borislav Stojkov, who devised the 1979 urbanistic plan for Slavija, called it a "kitsch-parade", waste of money and "Potemkin village in the center of Belgrade". Architectural theorist and member of the Serbian Academy of Architecture Slobodan "Giša" Bogunović described it as the "rosemary on the lapel of the ragged suit", "illiterate pleasing to the taste of politicians and ignorant councilors" and "water well that swallowed lot of money". Author and critic Milan Vlajčić called it an "insult for Belgrade", a "Chinese rattle" and a "nonsense". Bakić called it an "eyesore" and "watering trough".

Politicians, on the other hand, praised the project. Vesić dismissed all criticism calling it "political" and that after only three days, the fountain became the "symbol of Belgrade". Minister of Construction, Transport and Infrastructure, Zorana Mihajlović, stated that to her, Slavija is more beautiful with the fountain. President of Serbia Aleksandar Vučić, who in terms of administration or jurisdiction has nothing to do with the fountain, defended the project saying that he can't give an answer to "those who complain that they have no access to the fountain...what did they expect, that they will be able to wash their feet in it" and to "people who hate the entire world". Vučić added that those who criticize the fountain actually can't forgive him "because he participated in three strongest, most compelling victories in the modern Serbian history", referring to the last three electoral rounds. He asserted that the fountain is among the ten most beautiful ones in Europe. The fountain was damaged in December 2017 when a van, which participated in the three-car collision, hit its outer granite plates, forcing it out of service for a week.

In September 2018, the commission was formed to choose which songs will be played. It was officially named "The Commission for the realization of the artistic work of the fountain on the Slavija Square". With everything that happened during the construction, and things which followed (malfunctioning, wetting the carriageways, shutting down because of the repairs, several car accidents including cars crashing into the fountain damaging it), it has been described as the controversial, "creature" and "jinxed attraction", with dubious effect on traffic safety in the square. Occasional crashes into the fountain continued in 2019 and 2021.

Controversies continued around the COVID-19 pandemic, mostly because of deputy mayor Vesić. He announced the fountain would play "patriotic" songs for the Statehood Day on 15 February. Part of the cultural establishment called it unacceptable, opposed to the meaning of the holiday and political campaigning. Though the idea wasn't publicly dropped, the fountain remained silent on holiday. Vesić ordered for the fountain and several other city landmarks to be lit in the lights of the German flag, supporting Germany in fighting the outbreak, on the eve of 6 April, anniversary of the vicious 1941 German bombing of Belgrade, which killed several thousand people and destroyed up to 25% of the city. This action met with almost unanimous public odium. In order to support Serbian health workers, on 11 April he organized gathering of city communal workers, who parked various vehicles around the fountain during the total pandemic curfew. At the time when citizens already began to support health workers with applause in the evening, early 1-minute long applause, with Vesić's TV statement was labeled magnificent by the government media, while the opposition called it a political campaign.

==== Roundabout ====
After the fountain was opened, on 10 June 2017 the first phase of the reconstruction began. It includes the demolition of the smaller, illegally built edifices around Slavija. The latest change in the project includes a small park between the Kralja Milana and Nemanjina streets. The park will be a location of the monument to Dimitrije Tucović, which was removed from the center of the roundabout. The deadline for the reconstruction was 7 November 2017. However, in the summer of 2017, major traffic congestions developed in the wider downtown area as the city began several large reconstructions of important traffic spots. Due to the delays because of the failed tendering and problems with permits, the reconstructions of the Ruzveltova street (which began in May), Bulevar Oslobođenja and Slavija (June), Bore Stankovića (July) Branko's Bridge, Plateau of Milan Mladenović and Beogradska (August) and Glavna in Zemun, all overlapped in August. The summer of 2017 has been named as an example of a good idea with a bad plan, it was nicknamed the "hell summer", while the commuting through the city was described as a "nightmare". Concerning Slavija, there was also a matter of the fountain which was shut down and conserved until the works on the square were finished. Fountain worked only for two and a half months, so questions are asked why the square wasn't finished first, cause now there are additional costs (conservation, etc.) for the already too expensive fountain.

The works on Slavija were awarded to the "Ratko Mitrović" company, which was already criticized for its handling of the 2014 reconstruction of the Vojvode Stepe Street. The situation, described as the "months of collapse" was further aggravated by the temporary strikes of the workers of "Ratko Mitrović" because their salaries were months late and the company didn't pay their social and health insurance. They organized strikes on 13 July and 11 September. It was announced that the company didn't pay the insurance and pension fees for the workers since 2014, which raised question how the city could choose such a company because one of the conditions was that they have no debts to the state. On 13 October 2017, while the excavator was digging a channel on Slavija, a lump of hard material fell from its bucket onto the main water pipe in this part of the city causing it to burst. As a result of the pipe burst, described as a "deluge", the water was ejected 3 m (9.8 ft) in the air and the pond was created in the center of the square, up to 2 m (6 ft 7 in) deep. The water then spilled over into the ending section of the Kralja Milana street, further complicating the traffic. Though the problem was fixed later that day, the communities on social networks had a field day with the comments and photomontages. They especially made fun of mayor Siniša Mali's comment on a previous incident with the Slavija fountain ("it isn't cracked, it overspills") and his and president Alexander Vučić's pet project Belgrade Waterfront (in Serbian, Beograd na vodi, "Belgrade on the water"). The three most problematic spots were open for traffic simultaneously on 16 November 2017 (Slavija, adjoining Bulevar Oslobođenja, Ruzveltova) even though none of them were fully completed. Citizens noted that not much appears to be changed after such a long reconstructions, while mayor Mali admitted that on Slavija only the pavement was changed.

Soon, the problems appeared, apparently as a result of hasty and low quality work. By January 2018 the granite slabs on the sidewalks and concrete bedding for the tram tracks were cracking, the asphalt concrete with which the streets were paved was denting, while the painted marks and signs were peeling off.

==== Plateau ====
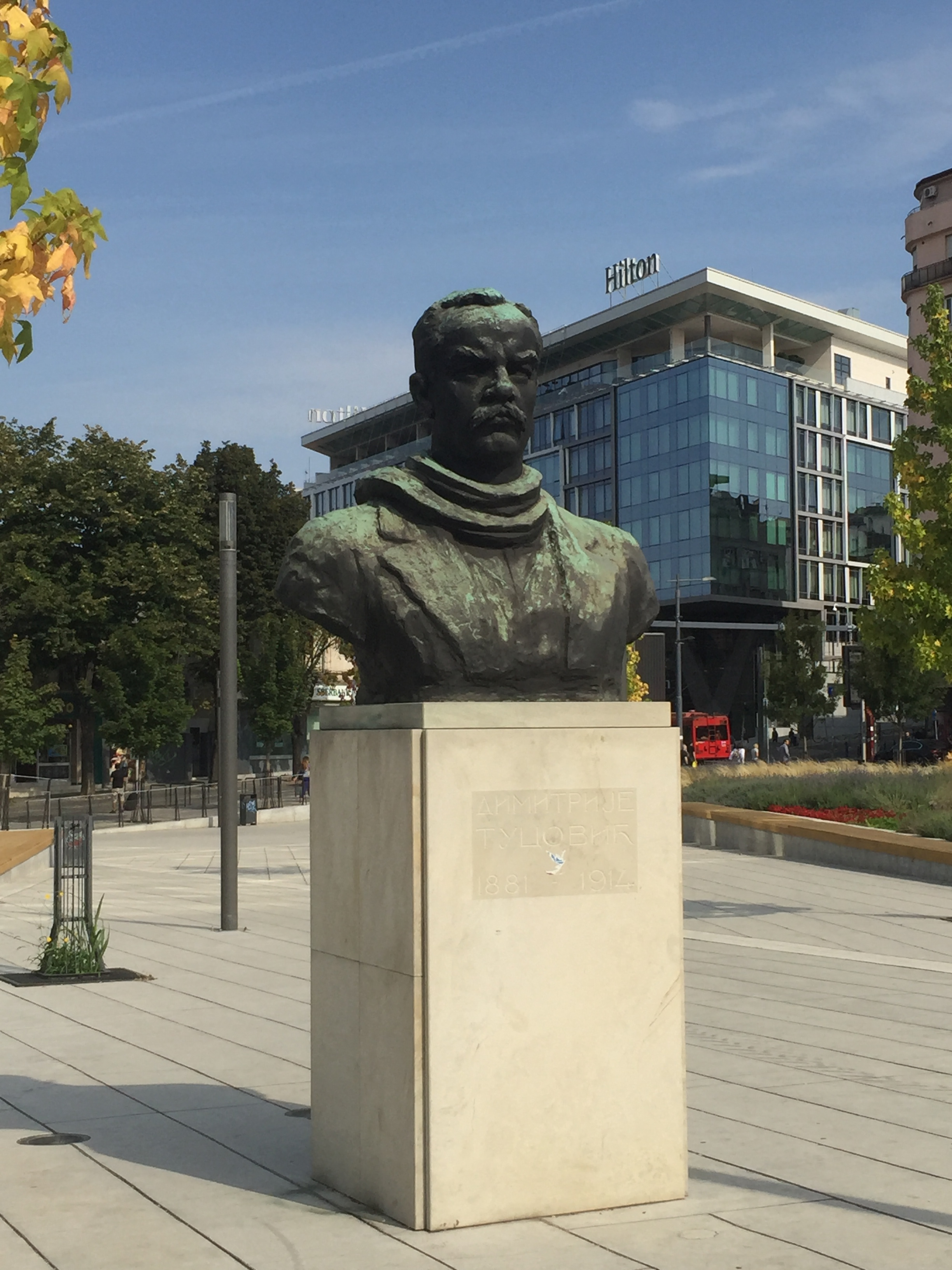
Bust of Dimitrije Tucović in 2020, after relocation to the newly arranged plateau. The Belgrade Hilton is in the background

The park, promised by the authorities, turned out to be a large concrete-granite plateau. Even though still being under construction, the cracks and deterioration were quite visible by February 2018. City architect Milutin Folić then announced that the plateau will host info-center, public restroom, a mini store and an observation point from which people could watch the fountain. He set the deadline for October 2018. Still, by April 2018 the damages and cracks were widespread and the granite plating of the plateau began to crumble. The city secretariats, contractors and planners all accused each other, blaming the bad project, dumping prices, bad sub-contractors, etc. The same contractor, "MBA MIljković" has been previously hired by the city several times and each time there were problems (Vojvode Stepe Street, Ruzveltova Street), but city continued to hire them "because they always had the lowest price". City ordered them to fix the problems by May or the penalties will be collected.

The repair of the still unfinished plateau began on 18 April 2018, with deadline set to mid-May. As works barely progressed, city extended the deadline until early August. The construction on Slavija has been jokingly named "The Building of Slavija", after epic poem The Building of Skadar in which the construction of a fortress was hampered by a vengeful fairy who destroyed by night everything the workers would build by day. The deadline was then prolonged again, to 31 August. On 1 September, works officially ended and the drinking fountain has been placed, with journalists noting that no one will probably ever be blamed or punished for such a sloppy work. It turned out that not everything was completed even though the workers left on the deadline date, which prompted the mayor Zoran Radojičić to state how he is "disappointed because not everything was finished", while the arrangement of the plateau extended further. By November 2018 it was evident that the plateau was cracking all over again and was still being occasionally repaired. Allegedly, it was because of the trams passing by, even though city administration plans to conduct new tram tracks around the plateau. Over the cracked concrete, the decking began, but the deck started deteriorating and cracking right away, even before the placing of it was finished.

The bust of Tucović was returned to the square on 16 October 2018, but placed on the new pedestal built on the plateau, close to the building of the National Bank. In July 2019, ten months after the official completion of the works, city administration admitted there are damages, though it was obvious before (cracks, including some quite long ad deep, especially on the cascade part of the plateau, sitting areas cracked and crumbled, broken slabs all over, neglected and out of order drinking fountain). City summoned the contractors who defended themselves claiming that city added additional jobs to then so they couldn't do the previously accepted jobs properly, but also blamed a weather. City, on the other hand, also accused occasional skaters of breaking the slabs. City ordered the contractors to fix the plateau until December 2019, when the warranty expires, or the city will activate the collateral.

The elevated part of the plateau, in one of the corners, was envisioned as the location of the Belgrade Tourist Organization office, public restroom and a kiosk. As of July 2019, nothing has been built. Due to the lack of any maintenance, the decorative decking deteriorated by 2023, but city accused citizens using skateboards and bicycles. In general, the plateau never became a gathering point of citizens as intended, due to the lack of practicality in design and lack of greenery. Lack of residents and social component for architect Bojan Kovačević is a confirmation that Slavija is actually not a proper square.

=== 21st century ===
In November 2021 city announced the project for the block between the square's plateau and the Manjež park, in the northwest direction. It included construction of three buildings, 13-storey building at the square, 14-storey building across the park, and 6-storey building which would connect two residential towers. The connecting building was to have a green roof, with park cultivated on it. Central section of the block, parallel to the outer Kralja Milana and Nemanjina streets, was to include green, pedestrian passage which would directly connect the square and Manjež. Project, drafted by Anđela Karabašević Sudžum and Vladislav Sudžum, also included construction of additional floors on the old, already existing buildings in the area.

When the developer, Maison Royal company, asked for 32,800 m^{2} (353,000 sq ft) of total floor area above the ground (plus 15,500 m^{2} (167,000 sq ft) below), instead of the projected 21,000 m^{2} (230,000 sq ft) envisioned by the competition, the Sudžums withdrew deeming it inappropriate for this location. The developer itself is controversial. Partially owned by the former footballer Dejan Stanković, it is known for the corruptive deals with city officials, and illegal, or after the fact permitted constructions. Demolition of the block began on 17 August 2023.

The area was partially placed under preliminary protection as potential cultural monument. but the preliminary protection expired on 25 December 2020, the protection was not confirmed, and the demolition was allowed. Demolished buildings include the Old Citizens Savings Bank from the 19th century (at the corner of Svetozara Markovića and Kralja Milana streets), Citizens Savings Bank (1929, by Stevan Tobolar; 43 Svetozara Markovića), and 1927 building by Milan Zloković at No. 47. All buildings have individual architectural values but are not protected.

== Administration ==
Slavija is today divided between the municipalities of Vračar and Savski Venac. Savski Venac's section was within the local community of West Vračar, while Vračar's section was organized as the local community of Slavija with a population of 4,608 in 1981 and 4,281 in 1991. That local community was later annexed to Cvetni Trg (total population of 25,759 in 2002), but municipality of Vračar later abolished local communities altogether.

== Traffic importance ==
Tram roundabout route on Slavija Square

Slavija was projected as the final square in a succession of squares around Belgrade's central route from Kalemegdan to Englezovac: Studentski Trg-Trg Republike-Terazije-Cvetni Trg-Slavija. In time, Studentski Trg and Terazije lost their square functions, becoming streets, while Cvetni Trg, with final changes in early 2000s, is completely defunct as a traffic object, so Slavija and Trg Republike remain as the rare true squares in downtown Belgrade.

Today, as one of the major Belgrade squares, it stands as a vibrant traffic object. It is one of the rare traffic routes in the city where all three types of public transportation (buses, trolleybuses and trams) meet. Traffic jams are frequent, due to the inadequacy of the city's transportation methods. They are especially difficult to clear if an additional reason is to blame (e.g. bad weather, snow, reconstruction of the Autokomanda interchange in 2006, etc.).

The transportation importance of the square can be seen as it branches into the eight streets:

- Boulevard of Liberation, which goes up and down the Vračar hill and connects it to Autokomanda and the highway;
- Svetog Save, which also goes up the Vračar hill and ends up at the Temple of Saint Sava;
- Makenzijeva, which also through Vračar connects it to the neighborhood of Čubura;
- Prote Mateje, which connects it to the Belgrade's longest street, Boulevard of the King Alexander;
- Beogradska, which also connects it to the Boulevard of the King Alexander, and the neighborhood of Tašmajdan and further to Palilula;
- Kralja Milana, the main street of Belgrade, going through downtown (Terazije) and further to the Square of the Republic and Kalemegdan;
- Nemanjina, which connects it to the main railway and bus stations and the bank of the Sava river;
- Deligradska, which connects it to the vast complex of the Clinical Center of Serbia;

Over 70,000 pedestrians and 140,000 vehicles pass through Slavija daily.

After the prolonged 2016-2018 reconstruction, the roundabout was further narrowed to make room for the central fountain while nothing to fix any traffic problems was done. After the Republic Square reconstruction in 2019, without any announced plans, and due to the botched works on the square and city administration's wish to turn the entire downtown into the pedestrian zone, lines of public transportation across the Slavija were partially shortened, making Slavija the terminus (trolleybuses 21 and 22), or were completely abolished (trolleybus 19). Thousands of commuters were then forced to use the square as a transfer station for further commuting to downtown, with additional bus line 22A being introduced as trolleybuses replacement, further polluting already highly polluted city.

This caused instant traffic jams in Slavija, already burdened by the massive traffic. Already crowded, the remaining lines became almost useless during the rush hours as they were constantly overcrowded, while pedestrian part of the square became a "race track" for the commuters who have to run to make a transfer as neither the timetable nor the location of the stations were synchronized. It was pointed out that after the reconstruction the traffic worked "somehow", but that after latest changes it collapsed completely. City authorities stated they acted after "serious analyses and talks" and upon wishes of the citizens. Asked to make public those analyses and explain when and how the citizens were interviewed about such major changes, administration refused to disclose any documents.

The architects, however, don't consider Slavija a proper square, neither in traffic nor in social-gathering sense. It is rather a plain roundabout, and a badly organized one.

== Architecture ==
Due to numerous and constant changes in the architectural structure of the urban tissue surrounding the square, Slavija became a synonym for an architecturally ugly and devastated area and the source of one of the most popular urban legends in Belgrade: the curse of the Mitićeva rupa ("Mitić's hole").

=== Mitićeva rupa ===
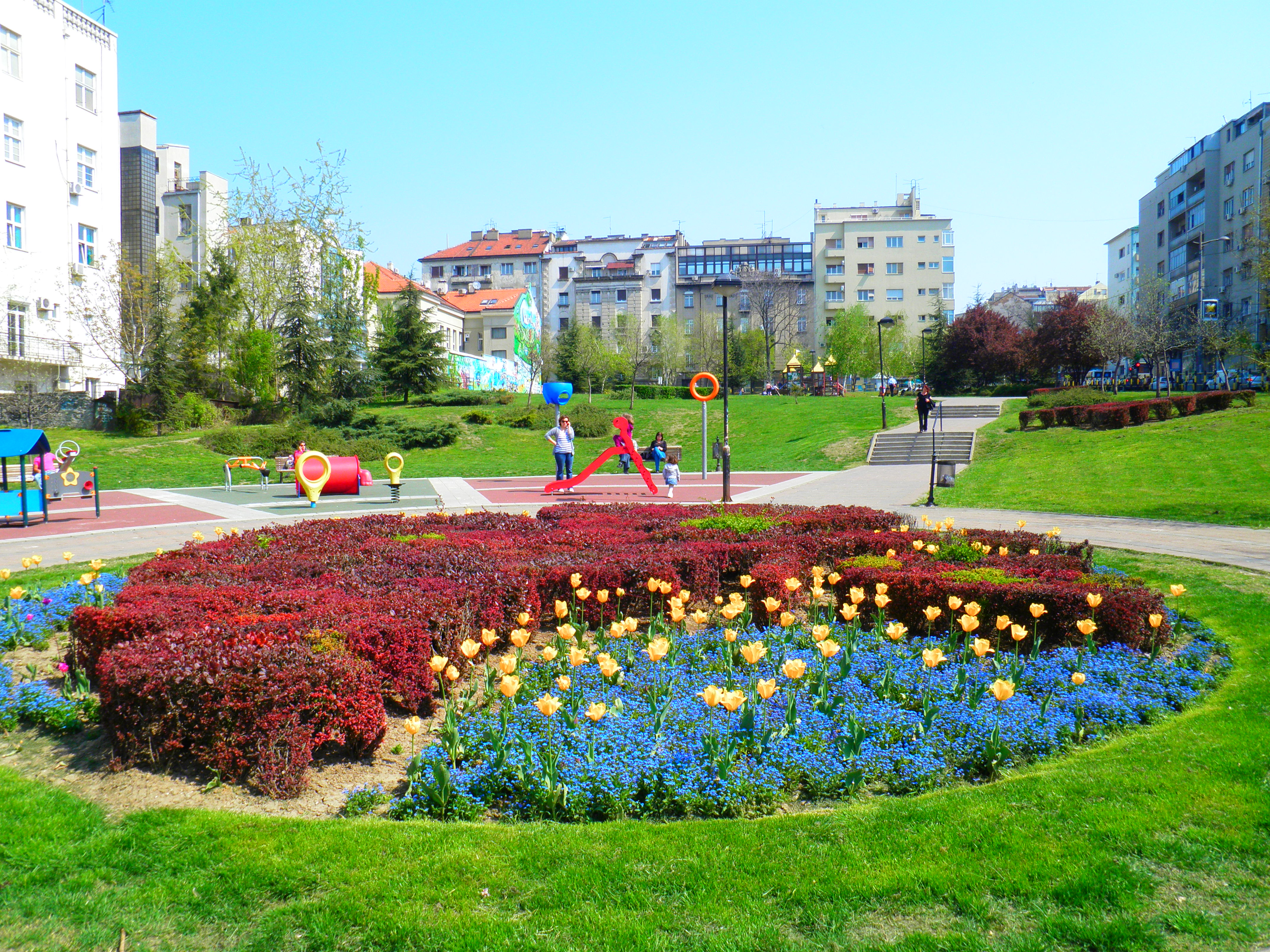
Park in Mitićeva Rupa, in 2013

In the 19th century, the "Rudničanin" kafana was located at the modern corner of Beogradska and Kralja Milana streets. In decades before the opening of the Belgrade Main railway station in 1884, the venue was one of the major transloading and packaging spots in Belgrade. It had a vast yard, which also included stables and quarters for merchants and bullockies, where the goods and food arriving from the interior were stored and repackaged for the city markets. The complex survived until the 1920s.

In 1935, one of the richest people in Belgrade before World War II, Vlada Mitić, bought the lot to build the largest department store in the Balkans, but the outbreak of the war halted the realization, though the foundations were dug. The project was to be the third twin of the Palace Albanija, the tallest building and the first skyscraper in Belgrade and in the Balkans at the time. The future store was tentatively named "Mitić Warehouse" or "Mitić Tower", and was planned to be even taller than Albanija itself, with the height of 60 m (200 ft).

After the war, Communist government imprisoned Vlada Mitić and confiscated his entire property, including the lot on Slavija, on the corner of the Kralja Milana and Beogradska streets, and money prepared for the construction of the department store. From 1946 to 1980 26 different project were completed for the lot, but none was realized. Then mayor of Belgrade, Bogdan Bogdanović decided to put a large sundial in the place in the first half of the 1980s. In the early 1990s, Dafiment banka, one of the major Ponzi schemes of the Milošević's regime, bought the lot and announced a monumental shopping mall, but after the scheme failed completely, the lot was fenced and turned into the dump. After the regime change in 2000, the area was cleaned and a temporary park with children playground was built instead. The failed projects continued, including the ultra-modern, gigantic shopping mall by the Israeli investors which turned out to be a complete hoax. All of this was more than enough for people to consider the "hole" a cursed place. The park was renovated from April to July 2017.

The entire lot covers 6.573 m^{2} (70.75 sq ft) and by 2021, one third was returned to the pre-World War II owners in the restitution process. In March 2021 it was announced that the private owners sold their parcels to the Czech developer "Sebre", which already purchased properties of Marina Dorćol and Avala Grad. According to the 2005 project of the square, which served as the basis for the development of the area, a massive commercial and residential building is planned. Citizens reacted by organizing a petition for the park to remain instead. Despite two thirds of the area are not held by the "Sebre", and the project was still unknown, deputy mayor Goran Vesić in May 2021 announced that the Czech company will build "a magnificent building", with triumphal arch.

In 2021, the Do not let Belgrade drown organized a petition "For park in Slavija", to turn the area into the permanent, proper park. In October 2022, it was proposed that the park should be named the Dušan Jovanović Park, after a 13-year Romani boy beaten to death in 1997 by the skinheads in the vicinity of the Mitićeva Rupa. The motion was officially filed to the city government in October 2023.

=== Cinema Slavija ===
Built in 1888, the residence of Francis Mackenzie became known as the "Peace Salon" after it was ceremonially opened in 1889. Next to it, a pharmacist Kosta Nikolić built a one-storey house which became a well-known pharmacy, so as the several smaller buildings around it with shops, including the tinsmith Anton Šuster. The Serbian Social Democratic Party purchased the edifice in 1910, turning it into the center of the burgeoning worker's movement. In the early 1930s the venue was transformed into the inn.

After World War II, new authorities nationalized everything and turned former Mackenzie's residence into the "Slavija" cinema, occupying area between the Beogradska and Prote Mateje streets. For decades one of the symbols of Belgrade, the cinema was demolished in 1991, but like the Mitić's hole, none of the projects for construction on this site have been realized, though the official reason for the demolition of the entire quarter, including the former Nikolić's complex, was the construction of the new Beobanka building. Not knowing what to do with the empty lot, city government turned it into the temporary parking lot. As of 2020, the area is still a parking and the land is in the process of restitution to the descendants of its pre-nationalization owners. One of the nationalized parcels, owned by the medical doctor and radiologist Aleksandar Marković (1878-1961), which covers 400 m^{2} (4,300 sq ft), was returned to his descendants in October 2020. Majority of the modern parking lot is located on it.

=== Slavija hotels ===
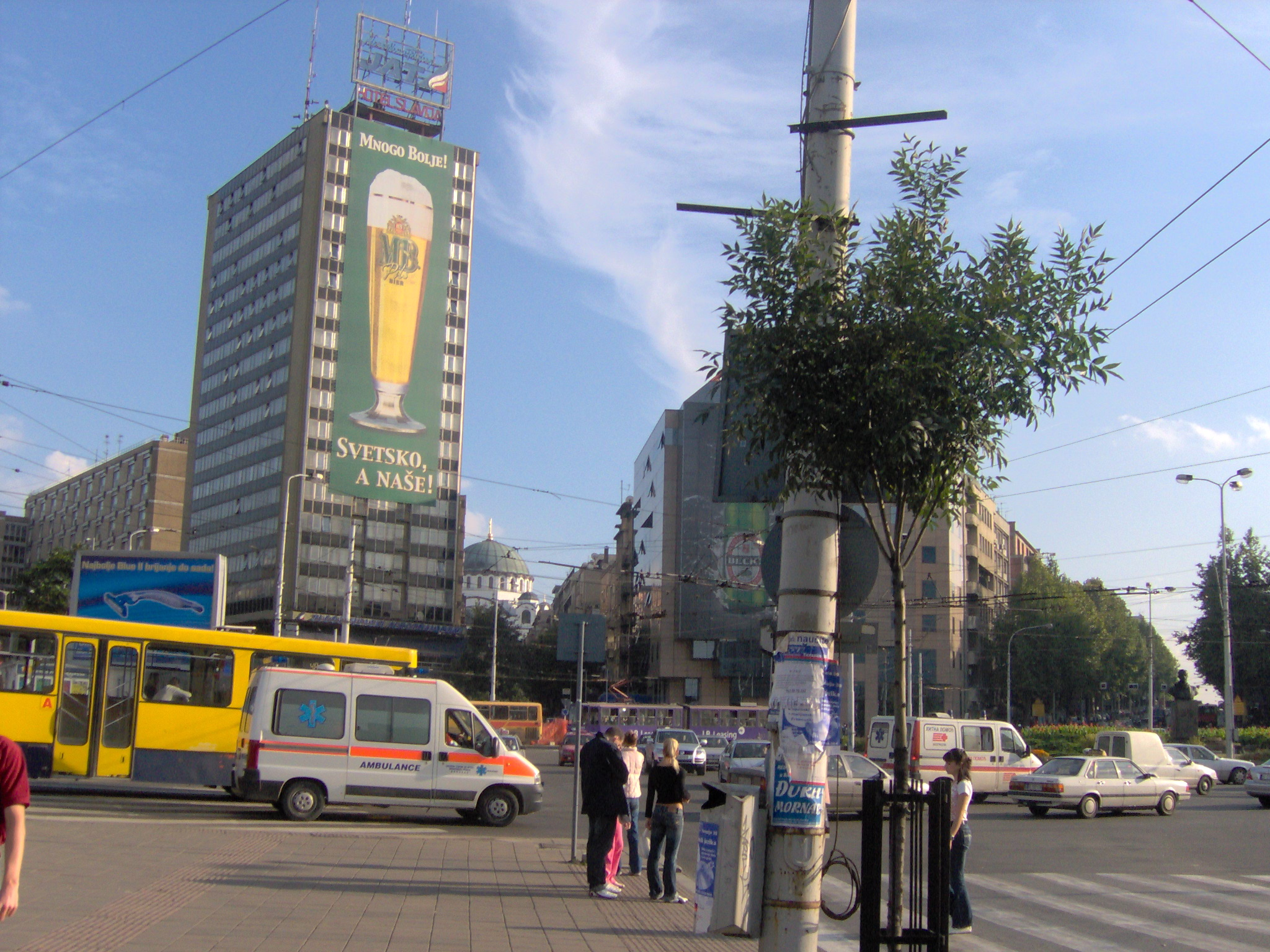
Slavija Square - looking towards “Jat Airways Slavija Hotel” (centre) and Slavija Lux (far right)

There are three Slavija hotels on the square:

- Slavija I, between the Makenzijeva and Svetog Save streets, right on the square;
- Slavija II, also between those two streets but behind the Slavija I (to which it makes one complex), further from the square;
- Slavija Lux, across the old hotels, between the street of Svetog Save and the Boulevard of the Liberation;

The old hotel Slavija from 1962, in the manner of the International style is today viewed by the Belgraders as an obsolete and ugly building, with its hospital-like look, especially compared to the modern marble and glass Slavija Lux which perfectly fits into the buildings behind it. Inside the hotel is elaborately decked out with wooden panelling on most surfaces in the rooms. It features a Casino and large dining room. The hotel was never fully renovated and still operates, though not using all rooms.

The hotel was opened in 1962 before the 7th European Athletics Championships. The oldest section, Slavija I, also known as Kula ("Tower"), has 17 floors. Slavija II was added in 1973, serving as the dependency of Slavija I. Slavija Lux, built in only 6 months in 1989, was opened for the 9th Summit of the Non-Aligned Movement. Altogether, there are 600 rooms in all three buildings.

=== National Bank of Serbia ===
Construction of the new building of the National Bank of Serbia also began in the early 1990s. It is located a little bit further from the square itself, but due to its size it is visible from many parts of Belgrade. Money problems caused a decade and a half of delays. A massive construction was deemed ugly and inappropriate for the location by many Belgraders and in 1994 the then governor of the bank, Dragoslav Avramović, stated that he would not move into the new building even if it were completed on time. The massive glass building was finished in 2006.
