= Ahmed Ademović =

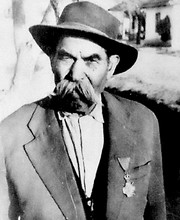
Ahmed Ademović, trumpeter of the Serbian military

Ahmed Ademović (Serbian Cyrillic: Ахмед Адемовић; 1873 – December 1965) was a Serbian trumpeter who received the Karađorđe's Star military decoration for his involvement at the Battle of Kumanovo (23–24 October 1912) of the First Balkan War in which Serbia fought against the Ottoman Empire. He was of Muslim Roma and belonged to the Romani people in Serbia origin, born in the Podvorce neighbourhood of Leskovac. The battle started 50 km earlier than the Serbian troops expected as the better prepared Ottomans surprised them. Ademović reached the opponents' part of the plain and got behind them, where he sounded for retreatment and got the Turkish (Ottoman) lines confused, and starting to retreat. As fast as he could, he ran back to the Serbian troops and sounded for attack. Ahmed's cleverness made him one of the heroes of the battle won by the Serbians. On 3 December 1941 Ademović's two sons were executed along with some 300 or 400–500 Romani by German troops at Arapova dolina in the outskirts of Leskovac. Following this he never played his trumpet again. He wore his decoration until his death at 92 years of age. There were two other Romani who received Karađorđe's Star, both trumpeters and both from Leskovac: Ahmet Ametović (for the Battle of Bregalnica) and Rustem Sejdić (for the Battle of Kaymakchalan). It has been decided by a veterans' descendants organization to erect a statue, memorial sign or name a street in Leskovac in his honour.

== Sources ==
- Momčilović, Milan (25 January 2010). "Ахмед одсвирао крај Турака на Балкану". Politika.
- Nikolić, D. (27 August 2014). "Srbija na Mundobasketu: Ko će nam biti novi Ahmed?". Sport. Blic.
- "Ahmed Ademović, zaboravljeni heroj Kumanovske bitke". juGmedia. 21 November 2016.
