= Nemanjina Street =

Street in Belgrade, Serbia

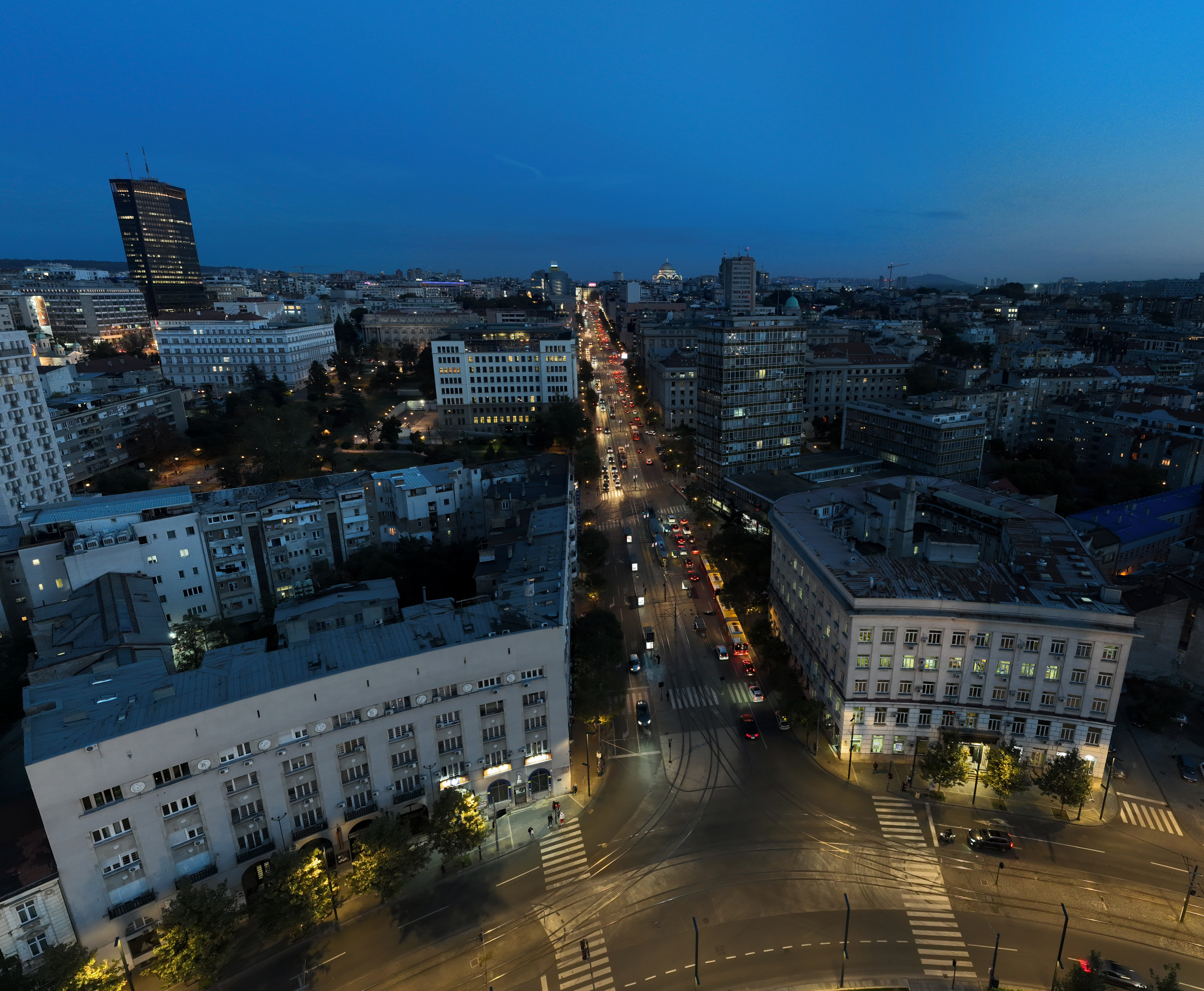
- Nemanjina Street by night

- Location within Belgrade
- Native name: Немањина улица (Serbian)
- Namesake: Stefan Nemanja
- Location: Belgrade
- Coordinates: 44°48′18″N 20°27′41″E

Nemanjina Street (Serbian: Немањина улица / Nemanjina ulica, lit. 'Nemanja's Street') is a very important thoroughfare in downtown Belgrade, Serbia, in the Savski Venac municipality. After the completion of the construction of the Railway station in 1884, it became one of the city's main infrastructure links, a "location where traffic arteries of the capital intersect". The street got its name in 1896, when it was named after a Serbian ruler from the 12th century, Stefan Nemanja.

== Location ==
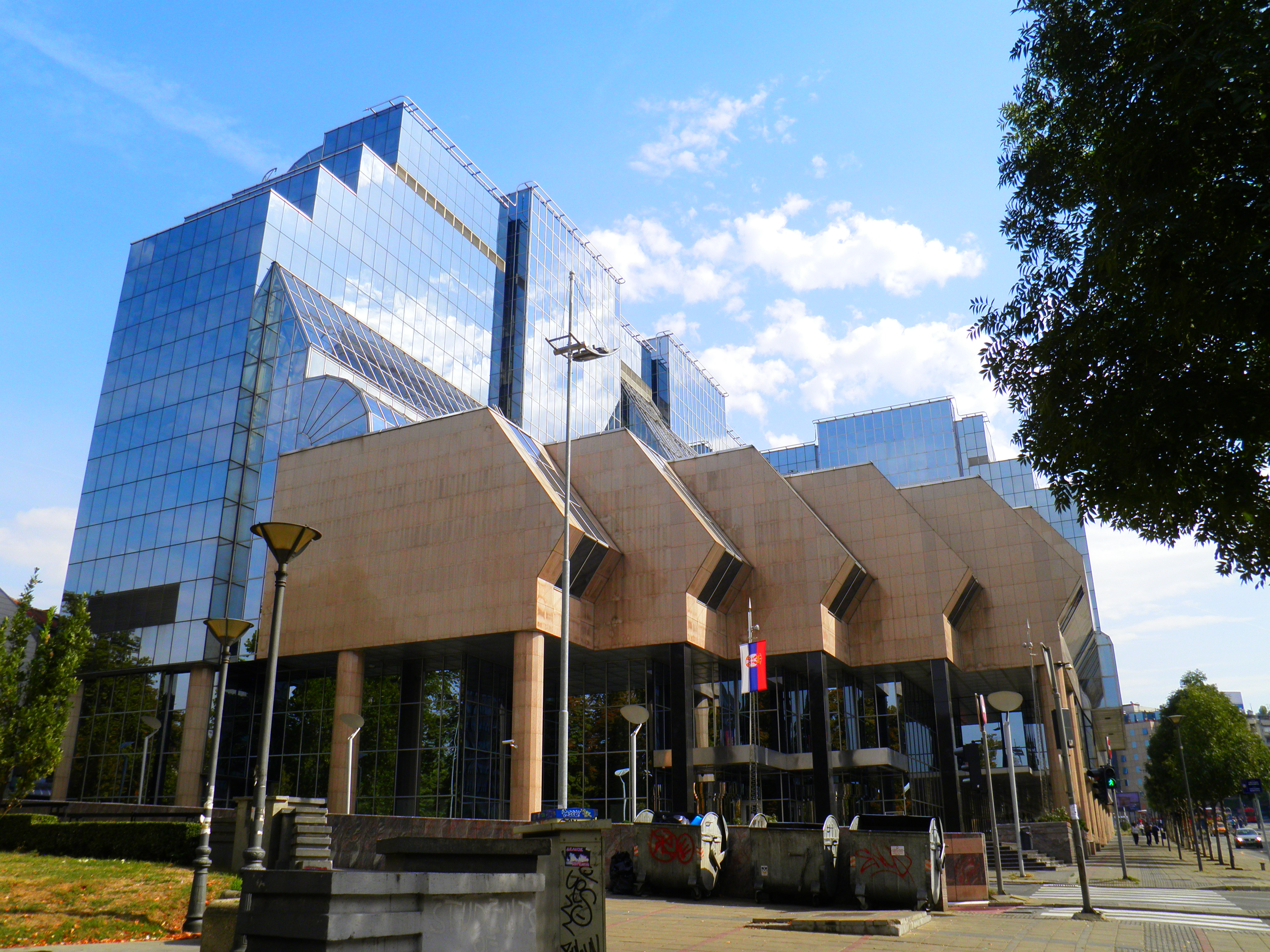
The new headquarters of the National bank of Serbia in Nemanjina Street

The street stretches from the Slavija Square, downhill to the Savamala neighborhood. It passes through the neighborhood of West Vračar, next to the parks of Manjež and Park Gavrilo Princip and numerous administrative buildings including the government, ministries, army headquarters and hospitals. On the lower end it finishes at the Belgrade Main railway station. It crosses several other important city streets, like Kneza Miloša Street and Balkanska Street.

== History ==
Originally, direction of the future street, due to its steepness, was a creek through which the pond on Slavija drained down into the Gypsy Pond in Savamala. The stream was named Vračarski potok.

One of the first permanent cinemas in Belgrade, in the kafana "Crna Mačka" (Black Cat), was opened in the Nemanjina Street after 1909.

During the major, catastrophic hailstorm which engulfed the entire Belgrade on 11 September 1967, the torrent formed down the street, recreating the former stream. Even the waves formed on the street, which were turning cars upside down and breaking off the entire blocks of cobblestone.

=== 2005-2006 reconstruction ===
In the winter of 2005, the reconstruction of the street began. It was one of the most important projects for the City of Belgrade. Not only did it have to close one of the most populous streets, but workers had to work at great speeds to complete the projects. It was an unprecedented case that such a massive work was done during the winter. The closing of the Nemanjina caused a major disturbance in the traffic, especially on the routes of the public transportation lines. After 5 months, when the project was finished in the spring of 2006, the new tram rails had been put in, new pathways constructed, a new parking lot opened in the street, and the drainage underneath the street changed and modernized.

== Features ==
Nemanjina Street is located in one of the most important places in Belgrade. It connects Belgrade's main railway station with the popular Slavija Square. Many of the most important administrative buildings in Belgrade are located in Nemanjina Street. The Yugoslav Ministry of Defence building that was bombed in 1999 during the NATO bombing of Yugoslavia, as well as the new building of the National Bank of Serbia are placed here. The Government Building in front of which Serbian prime minister Zoran Đinđić was assassinated 12 March 2003 is also located in this street.

=== Buildings ===
Barrack of the 7th Regiment (1899)

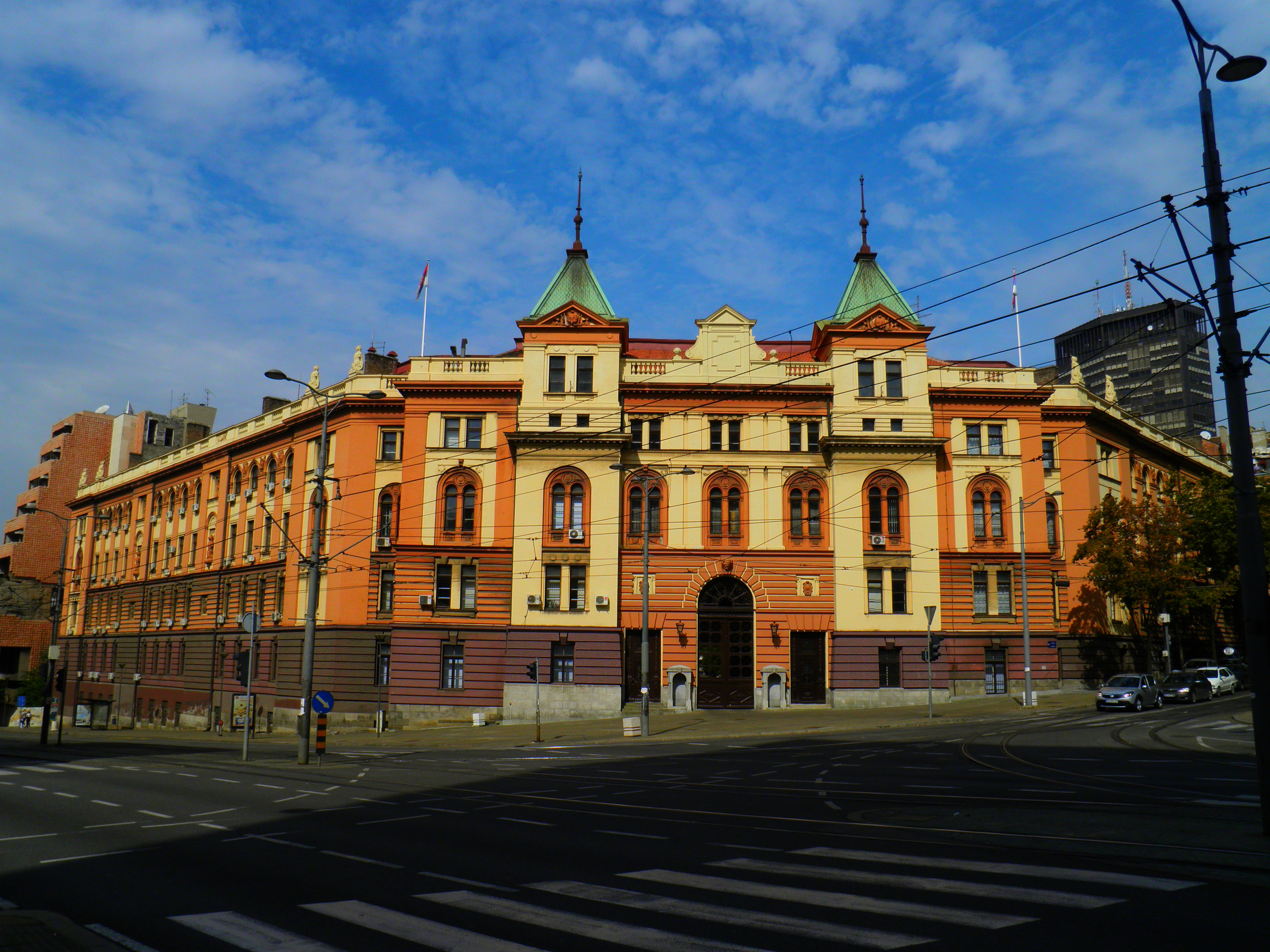
Barrack of the 7th Regiment

At the corner with Resavska Street is the Barrack of the 7th Regiment building. The representative edifice was constructed in 1899, and designed by Dragutin Đorđević. It served as the military barrack originally. Built during the rule of Alexander Obrenović, it was considered one of the most beautiful buildings in Belgrade at the time and hosted the elite guard's unit. Called "the pride of the throne", it was meant to celebrate the power of the Serbian army and its loyalty to the dynasty. However, it was the guards unit from this very barrack who conducted the May Coup in 1903 when the Obrenović dynasty was dethroned and King Alexander and Queen Draga were executed.

The building was located in the Military Quarter of Belgrade, which extended between the streets of Kneza Miloša, Kralja Milana, Birčaninova and the Slavija Square. The compound included buildings of the Serbian General Staff, Military Academy, Officers Storehouse, Officers House and the Royal Cavalry Guard training ground, or the modern park area. In terms of architecture, Đorđević implemented the style of the German Ritter barracks. Hence, above the entry nigh arch of the cart gate there are two square-shaped towers. The entire entry section is indented, leaving a small piazetta where the musters can be organized. The façade is ornamented with the sculptures symbolizing knights in armors or coats of arms. During the Interbellum, the 7th Regiment was situated in it.

In 1927 Ministry of the Army decided to upgrade the edifice by adding the third floor. They hired architect Blažo Vukićević Sarap, even though the original designer Đorđević was still alive. Academism-style building is a square-located structure, with three street façades and inner yard. The frontage is dominated by the arched portal, and two symmetrical avant-corps shaped like s square towers whose domes are towering over the roof construction. Façade is further enhanced by the semi-circular windows on the first floor, ornamental, separating garlands and ornaments shaped like heraldic cartouches with Kingdom of Serbia's coats of arms. To enhance the military function of the building, there are additional façade ornaments shaped like armors or shields. The building was declared a cultural monument in 1992.

Home of the Workers Chamber (1928)

A massive building at No. 28, at the corner with Svetozara Markovića Street, was built from 1 May to 24 November 1928. It was designed by Svetislav Putnik, in the style of Academism. The façade is simple and flat, decorated with artificial stone. Central part of the front façade was the arched, entry portal, with two sculptures representing workers. After World War II the sculptures were removed and lost, while the portal was walled in. The façade is generally symmetrical and horizontally divided. Rows of simple, three-light windows, shallow decoration and a certain asymmetry between the entrance and avant-corps, shows elements of early Belgrade Modernism.

Central part of the lobby occupies large, atrium-style theatre hall. In the 21st century, the entire building, from basement to the upper floors, serves as a theatre and cinema "Akademija 28". Due to its use, first by the working class, later as an educational and cultural venue, the building also holds a non-material heritage importance. The building was made of reinforced concrete and artificial stone. Original interiors remained only in traces, and modern appearance is a result of later reconstructions. The building was declared a cultural monument in January 2019.

Railway Museum (1931)

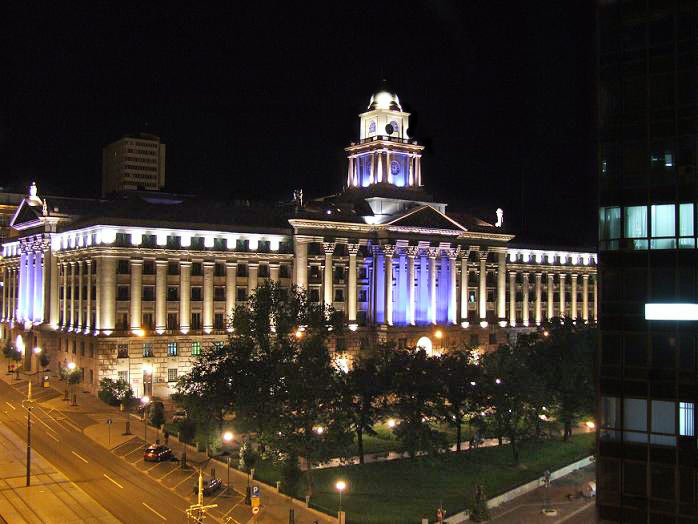
Railway Museum in Nemanjina Street

At No. 6, on the corner with the Hajduk Veljkov Venac, there is another massive building, location of various railway companies, Railway Museum and Institute of Transportation CIP. Section of Savamala on which the building was built was called Old Šivara ("Old Sewing Place"). Decision on building new government buildings was made during the government of Nikola Pašić and the first project was drafted in 1921 by architect Svetozar Jovanović. Minister of Transportation Svetislav Milosavljević acquired funding. and construction lasted from 1927 to 1931. Construction was immediately halted as the land was full of groundwater springs. Project was changed to include draining of the terrain, deep foundations of reinforced concrete and, construction-wise, division into 8 independent blocks.

The object is built of bricks, artificial stone and load-bearing construction of reinforced concrete. Façade is ornamented with stone sculptures, authored by Toma Rosandić, Lojze Dolinar, Dragomir Arambašić, Živojin Lukić and Risto Stijović. The most distinctive architectural detail is the tower-clock above the central section of the main façade, with sculptures of Atlases. Base covers 4,200 m^{2} (45,000 sq ft), while the total floor area of 860 rooms covers 33,000 m^{2} (360,000 sq ft).

At the entrance, there are two sculptures made of artificial stone. One represents a man who holds a flyhwheel, and the other is a woman holding a railway symbol. The building was heavily damaged in October 1944, during the final days of German occupation, since it was the last stand of the German army in Belgrade. Especially damaged were the façade and the frontage sculptures.

The building was described as one of the supreme architectural works in Belgrade during Interbellum. It was declared a cultural monument in 2007, as part of the protected complex "Area along the Kneza Miloša Street". Reconstruction of the façade began in September 2019 to be finished in 2021. Works were completed in February 2022.

Social Insurance Building (1963)

Specifically built to host Serbia's state-owned Pension and Disability Insurance Fund (PIO Fond). Considered one of the supreme works of architect Aleksej Brkić, it was finished in 1963. The building is located at 30 Nemanjina Street, at the corner with Svetozara Markovića Street. Brkić designed colored and ornamented façade, a major change in post-World War II architecture, mostly dominated by the Socialist realism imported by the post-war Communist government.

=== Monument to Stefan Nemanja ===
In December 2015, prime minister Aleksandar Vučić encouraged the local authorities to build a monument to Stefan Nemanja at Manjež park, which is located at the central part of the street. Promptly, in less than two weeks, city hall voted to construct the monument and even formed a committee for this specific monument. Dedication was scheduled for 2016 or early 2017. In April 2017 it was announced that the monument would be located 100 m (330 ft) down the street, in the clearing in front of the demolished Yugoslav Ministry of Defense building. International design competition was also announced. In September 2017, the city administration decided that the monument would be located at the lower ending section of the street, on the square of Savski Trg across the Main railway station which is envisioned as the future Museum of Medieval Serbia. International design competition was finished only in March 2018 and the winner was Russian sculptor Aleksandr Rukavishnikov. The monument was officially inaugurated on 27 January 2021.
