= Romani people in Serbia =

Ethnic group

Роми у Србији
- Ethnic flag of Romani people in Serbia

Total population
- 131,936 (2022)

Regions with significant populations
- Southern Serbia, Belgrade, Banat

Languages
- Balkan Romani, Romano-Serbian, Kurbetcha, Serbian

Religion
- Eastern Orthodoxy, Sunni Islam, Catholicism

Romani people, or Roma, are a recognized ethnic minority in Serbia. According to data from the 2022 census, they are the fourth largest ethnic group in the country, numbering 131,936 and constituting 2% of the total population. However, owing to various factors, the census figure likely underrepresents the actual population.

Another name used for the Romani people is Cigani (Serbian: Цигани, lit. 'Gypsies'), although the term is today considered pejorative and is not officially used in public documents.

== History ==
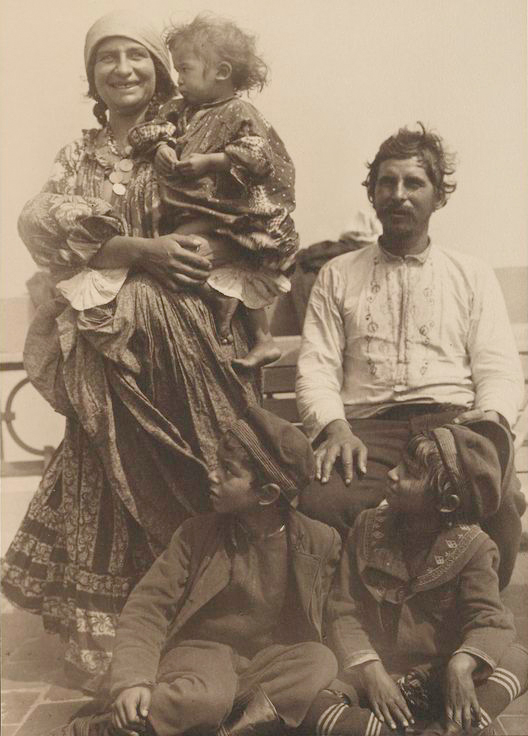
Roma family in Serbia, 1905

Research on Roma migrations is scarce. Roma often lived on the margins and their presence was often not registered in documents so it is difficult to claim any definite historical path of Roma. On some accounts, Roma arrived in Serbia in several waves. The first reference to Roma in Serbia is found in a 1348 document, by which Serbian emperor Stefan Dušan donated some Roma slaves to a monastery in Prizren. In the 15th century, Romani migrations from Hungary are mentioned.

In 1927, a Serbian-Romani humanitarian organization was founded. In 1928, a Romani singing society was founded in Niš. In 1932, a Romani football club was founded. In 1935, a Belgrade first Romani magazine, Romani Lil, was founded as well as Belgrade Romani association. In 1938, an educational organization of Yugoslav Romani was founded.

Romani people in Serbia are divided into subgroups, with different, although related, Romani dialects and history. As there are difficulties with the data collection, historization, and with the questionable familiarity of the Serbian scholars with Roma lives and culture and significant demographic changes and migrations of Roma population, it is difficult to establish one definite division within Roma community. According to the study of scholar Tihomir Đorđević (1868–1944), main sub-groups include "Turkish Gypsies" (Turski Cigani), "White Gypsies" (Beli Cigani), "Wallachian Gypsies" (Vlaški Cigani), and "Hungarian Gypsies" (Mađarski Cigani).

- Turkish Roma, also known as Arlia, migrated from Turkey. At the beginning of the 19th century the Turkish Roma lived mainly in southeastern Serbia, in what was at the time Sanjak of Niš. They are mainly Muslims although the Serbian state attempted their mass conversion to the Eastern Orthodoxy after the conquest of the sanjak in 1878, but without particular success. T. Đorđević noted an internal division between old settlers and new settlers, who had differing traditions, speech, family organization, and occupations.
- Wallachian Roma migrated from Romania, through Banat. They have converted to Eastern Orthodoxy and mostly speak Serbian. They are related to the Turkish Roma.
- "White Gypsies", migrated from Bosnia and Herzegovina at the end of the 19th century, later than other Romani groups, and considered sub-group of Turkish Roma. They mostly settled in towns and speak Serbian.
- Hungarian Roma.

== Demographics ==
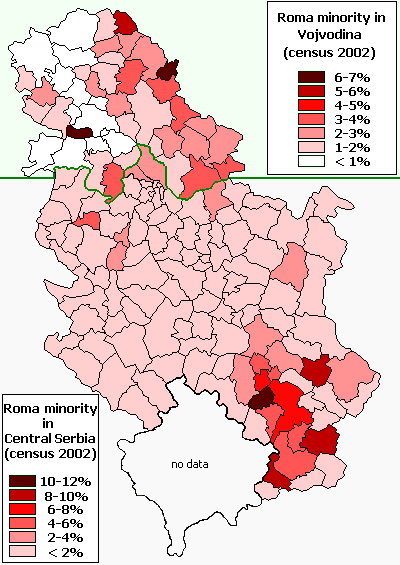
Share of Romani people by municipalities, 2002

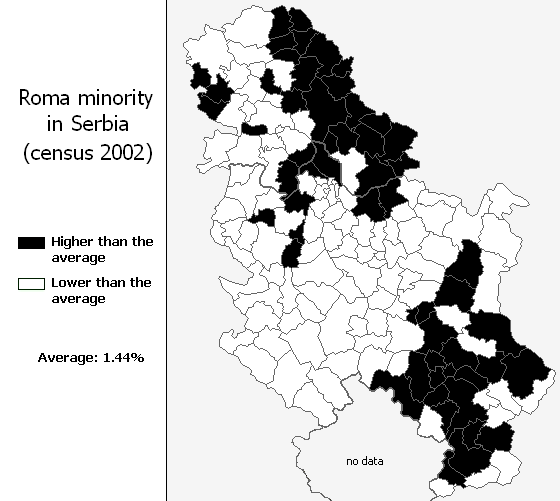
Average share of Romani people by municipalities, 2002

The largest concentration of Romani people in are to be found in Southern Serbia, Belgrade, Banat. In some administrative districts in southern Serbia, Romani population exceeds 5% of total population: Jablanica District (5.7%), Pčinja District (5.6%), and Pirot District (5.5%), respectively.

The published data from the 2022 Census included a crosstab of ethnicity and religion, which showed that Romani people were divided between the following religions: 57.2% were Eastern Orthodox, 25% Muslim, 3.3% were Catholics, and 3% Protestants.

Year	Population
1866	24,607
1895	46,000
1948	52,181
1953	58,800
1961	9,826
1971	49,894
1981	110,959
1991	94,492
2002 (excl. Kosovo)	108,193
2011 (excl. Kosovo)	147,604
2022 (excl. Kosovo)	131,936

== Politics ==
The National Council of Roma Ethnic Minority in Serbia is a representation body of Romani people, established for the protection of the rights and the minority self-government of Romani people in Serbia.

There are two ethnic minority parties representing interests of Romani people in Serbia: the Roma Union of Serbia and the Roma Party.

== Culture ==
The Romani people in Serbia mainly speak Romani and Serbian. Some also speak the language of other people they have been influenced by: Romanian or Hungarian. In 2005 the first text on the grammar of the Romani language in Serbia was published by linguist Rajko Đurić.

Đurđevdan (or Ederlezi) is a traditional feast day of Romani in Serbia.

Romani balkan brass musicians are popular in areas such as Vranje.

Hip-hop is frequently performed by Romani people in Serbia, and a number of Serbian rappers have Romani heritage.

== Discrimination ==
Due to a record of discrimination, human rights reporting mechanisms have consistently drawn attention to the treatment of the Romani people in Serbia. The United Nations have reported persistent discrimination and social exclusion as a concern, particularly stemming from poor birth registration and identity documentation for citizens, and inequitable access to education, housing, employment, and legal protections.

These persistent challenges cause many Roma to flee Serbia and other Balkan countries for EU countries. There are cases of children from Serbia being granted refugee status in Ireland due to persecution due to Roma identity. However, with increasingly strict asylum measures in the EU, countries such as Germany are increasingly labeling Serbia and other Balkan countries as "safe countries of origin" despite a lack of measurable improvement in the ability of Roma groups to realize human rights in these countries.

There have been hate-crimes against Roma community, such as the death of thirteen-year-old Dušan Jovanović (1997), and the murder of actor Dragan Maksimović, who was assumed by the perpertrators to be Roma.

A significant number of Romani people in Serbia live in segregated areas, often in shanty towns called "cardboard cities", without electricity or water or provision of public services. In 2009, a group of Romani people who had been living in a large shanty town in New Belgrade were evicted on the orders of the mayor of Belgrade. According to the media, bulldozers accompanied by police officers arrived to clear the site early in the morning before the formal eviction notice was presented to the inhabitants. The site was cleared in order to make way for an access road to the site of the 2009 Summer Universiade, to be held in Belgrade later this year. Temporary alternative accommodation in the form of containers had been provided, but some 50 residents of the suburb where they had been located attempted to set fire to three of the containers. Many of the evicted Roma have spent five nights sleeping in the open in the absence of any alternative accommodation.

Children of Romani descent in Serbia face the greatest risk of being involved in exploitative child labor activities such as begging, theft, prostitution, drug dealing, and strenuous physical work. These Serbian Roma children are also susceptible to human trafficking, both internationally and within the country, where they may be forced into begging and theft operations.

== Notable people ==
- Rajko Đurić – professor, journalist, and politician
- Srđan Šajn – politician
- Boban Marković – musician
- Fejat Sejdić – musician
- Janika Balaž – musician
- Šaban Bajramović – singer
- Džej Ramadanovski – singer
- Usnija Redžepova – singer
- Mina Kostić – singer
- Mudja – influencer
- Predrag Luka – football player
- Dejan Osmanović – football player
- Ahmed Ademović – soldier
- Zejna Murkić – singer

== See also ==
- Romano-Serbian language
- Gurbeti
- Lovari
- Khrlo e Romengo
- The Holocaust in German-occupied Serbia

== Sources ==
- Vlahović, Petar (2004). Serbia: the country, people, life, customs. Ethnographic Museum. ISBN 978-86-7891-031-9.
- IFDT (2005). Umetnost preživljavanja: gde i kako žive Romi u Srbiji. IFDT. ISBN 978-86-17-13148-5.
