= Romano-Serbian language =

Mixed language spoken in Serbia

Romano-Serbian
- Serbo-Romany
- Native to: Serbia
- Native speakers: 170,000 (2006)
- Language family: mixed Romani–Serbian

Language codes
- ISO 639-3: rsb
- Glottolog: roma1241

The Romano-Serbian language (Serbian: ромско-српски језик / romsko-srpski jezik, Romani: Romani-Serbikani chhib) is a mixed language (referred to as a Para-Romani variety in Romani linguistics) resulting from language contact between Serbian and Romani in Serbia and former Yugoslav countries and distinct from the Vlax Romani dialects spoken in Serbia.

== Publications ==
In 2005 the first text on the grammar of the Romani proper in Serbia was published by linguist Rajko Đurić, titled Gramatika e Rromane čhibaki - Граматика ромског језика (Gramatika romskog jezika).
