= Vračar Plateau =

Plateau on Vračar Hill, Belgrade, Serbia

- Coordinates: 44°47′50″N 20°28′00″E

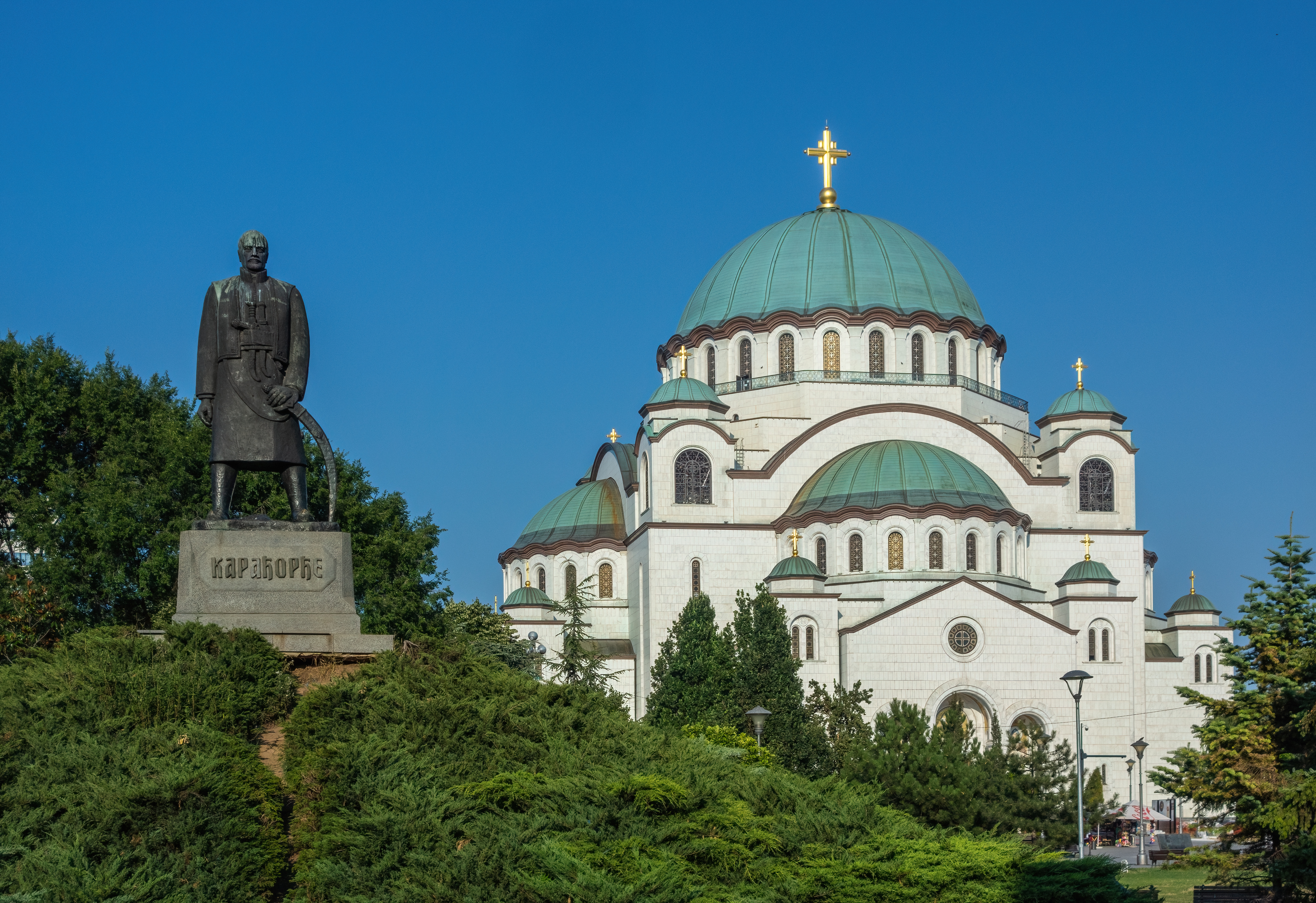
Karađorđe Monument and Church of Saint Sava

Vračar plateau (Serbian: Врачарски плато, romanized: Vračarski plato) is a plateau on top of the Vračar Hill in Belgrade, the capital of Serbia, with an absolute height of 134 metres (440 feet) above sea level. It is the purported location of the 1594 Burning of Saint Sava's relics by the Ottomans. The dominant position in Belgrade's cityscape made the plateau a natural location for the first meteorological observatory in Serbia, Belgrade Meteorological Station, built in 1891. The most distinctive feature of the plateau today is a massive Church of Saint Sava, visible from almost all approaches to the city, and one of the Belgrade's main landmarks. The plateau also houses Karađorđe's Park, Park Milutin Milanković, monument of Karađorđe Petrović and National Library of Serbia.

In May 2021, the plateau was protected as the spatial cultural-historical unit under the name Saint Sava's Plateau. The government noted "symbolical, memorial, cultural-historical, architectural-urban and artistic values of the locality, which represents memory spot of two turning points in Serbian history: Burning of Saint Sava's relics and the First Serbian Uprising".

== Location ==
The plateau is located on top of the Vračar Hill, in the Vračar municipality. To the north, it descends to the Slavija Square via the neighborhoods of Savinac and Englezovac. In the east, it extends into the neighborhood of Čubura. On the southern slope are Karađorđe's Park and the Neimar neighborhood, descending to Autokomanda. This entire area was known as East Vračar. Western section is occupied by the Park Milutin Milanković and Old Belgrade Observatory, extending into the vast Clinical Center of Serbia complex and West Vračar. The main thoroughfare passing across the plateau is the Liberation Boulevard (Bulevar oslobođenja).

== History ==
=== 16th century ===
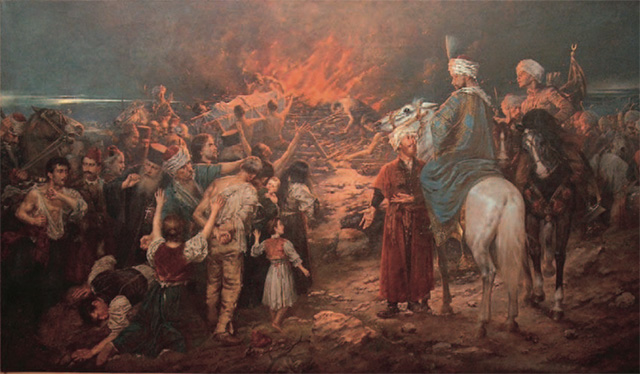
Burning of the Saint Sava's relics, 1912 painting by Stevan Aleksić

In 1594, Serbs rebelled against Ottoman rule in Banat, during the Long War (1591–1606) between Austrian and Ottoman Empire, along the border of two states. Serbian clergy and rebels established relations with foreign states, and in a short time captured several towns, including Vršac, Bečkerek, Lipova, Titel and Bečej, although the uprising was quickly suppressed. The rebels had, in the character of a holy war, carried war flags with the icon of Saint Sava, medieval Serbian prince and later first Archbishop of the autocephalous Serbian Church, founder of Serbian law and education, and a diplomat. He was one of the most revered saints among the Serbs.

Ottoman Grand Vizier Sinan Pasha decided to punish rebellious Serbs and ordered that the sarcophagus and relics of Saint Sava located in the Mileševa monastery be brought by military convoy to Belgrade. Along the way, the Ottoman convoy had people killed in their path so that the rebels in the woods would hear of it. The relics were publicly incinerated by the Ottomans, on 27 April 1595, as it was placed on a pyre and burnt on the Vračar plateau, and the ashes were scattered. According to Nikolaj Velimirović the flames were seen over both the Danube and the Sava rivers. The event, however, only sparked an increase in rebel activity, until the rebellion was fully suppressed in 1595.

Date and location of the Burning of Saint Sava's relics remained disputed. Even the exact year is unknown, with 1594 and 1595 being mentioned, so as the proposed locations, since the term Vračar was historically applied to the much wider territory than it occupies today. Propositions include: Crveni Krst, suggested by Gligorije Vozarović who erected reddish Vozarev Krst at the spot, which gave name to the entire neighborhood of Crveni Krst ("Red Cross"); mound of "Čupina Humka", in Tašmajdan, previously known as Little Vračar, which is the preferred location of modern historians; Vračar plateau, which attracted the widest public acceptance.

=== 19th century ===
In 1806 during the siege of Belgrade in the First Serbian Uprising, Serbian army set a camp at the top of the plateau's southern slope. After the Serbs secured Belgrade, soldiers killed in the battle on the liberation day, 30 November 1806, were buried at this place, which was arranged as the Insurgents Cemetery in 1848, when the Monument to the Liberators of Belgrade was also erected. The 5.5 m (18 ft) tall memorial was one of the first public monuments in Belgrade. Out of the 50 original tombstones, 12 still survived into the 2020s. The patron of the monument was Aleksandar Karađorđević, the ruling prince of Serbia, and son of the First Serbian Uprising leader and the founder of the Karađorđević royal family, Karađorđe.

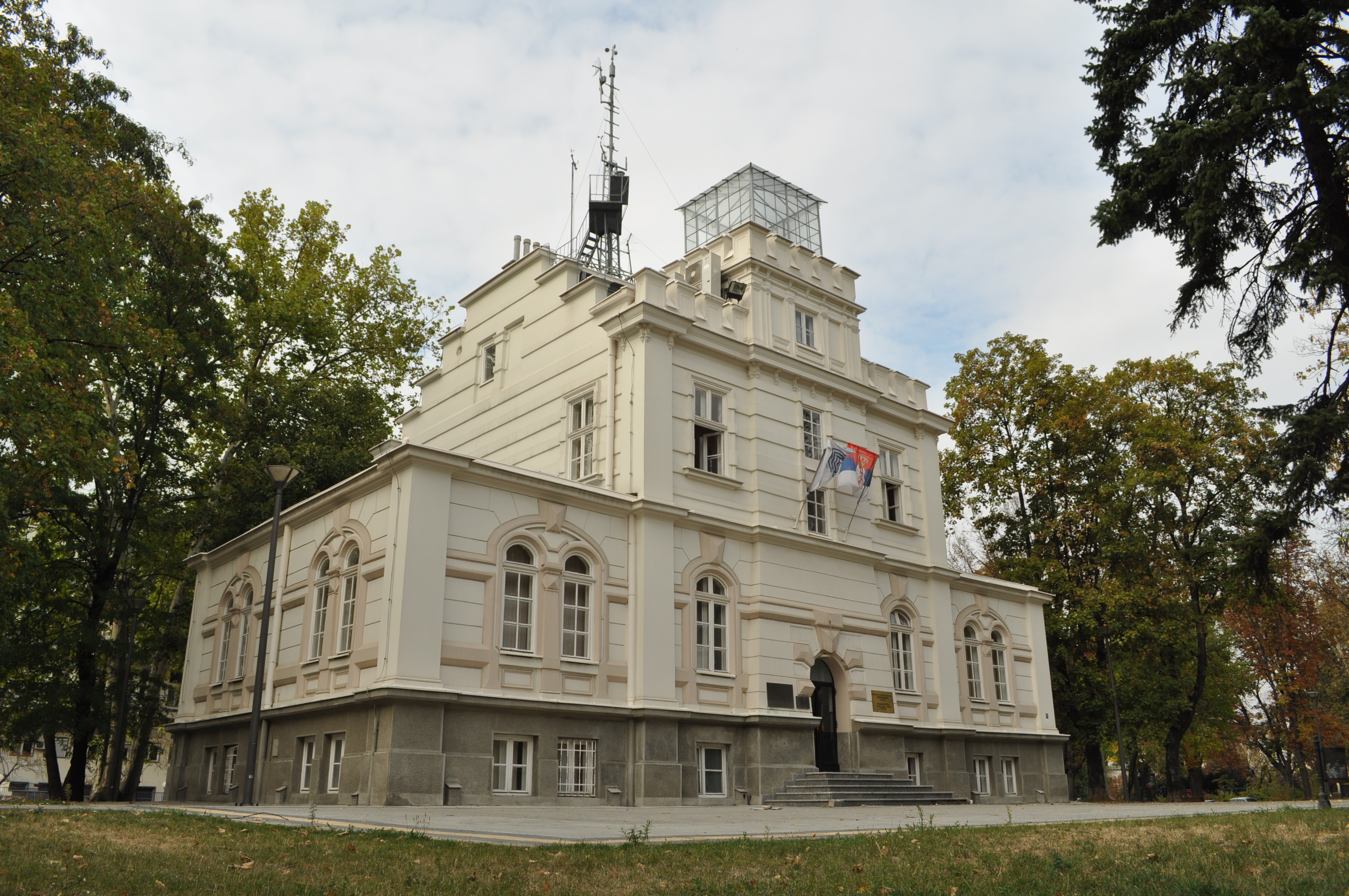
Building of the First Serbian Observatory, constructed in 1891

After the monument was erected, it was suggested that the park should be planted around it. City administration dismissed the idea, claiming lack of funds. One of the first avenues in Belgrade was planted along the Kragujevac Road (modern Liberation Boulevard), in 1848, from which the modern Karađorđe's Park developed in time. The planted seedlings were of chestnut trees, and the chestnut alley descending from the original one still survives in the park. By 1887, the cemetery and monument became neglected.

After ascending to the throne in 1889, king Alexander Obrenović ordered for the cemetery to be arranged. The remaining tombs were rearranged, the monument was renovated, and the metal fence was placed around it, while the seedlings of black locust were planted in order to form the memorial park. As the king was coming from the Obrenović dynasty, a fierce rival of the former (and future) Karađorđević dynasty, this was seen as the kings attempt to reconcile two ruling families. This prompted creation of numerous other memorial parks throughout Serbia.

The building of the First Serbian Observatory was specifically built for the astronomical and meteorological purposes at modern 8 Liberation Boulevard in 1891. It was constructed according to the design of architect Dimitrije T. Leko and equipped with the modern small instruments for astronomical and meteorological observations. Apart from its importance for astronomy and meteorology, the newly built observatory was a cradle of the seismic and geomagnetic research in Serbia. The observatory was also equipped with a seismograph. During the withdrawal from Belgrade at the end of the World War I in 1918, the occupational Austro-Hungarian army destroyed all the instruments in the observatory. The observatory was later relocated to the new complex built in Zvezdara from 1930 to 1932. That way, the building became known as the Old Zvezdara (Stara Zvezdara, meaning "old observatory").

In 1894, which was at the time celebrated as 300 years since the burning, consensus was reached to build the church on the plateau location. In 1895 the "Society for the Construction of the Church of Saint Sava on Vračar" was founded in Belgrade. A major part of the parcel donated for the construction came from Scottish missionary Francis Mackenzie, who purchased and developed this part of the city in the late 19th century. By the 1900 ukaz of King Alexander Obrenović, planned church was declared a "nationwide project". Small Church of Saint Sava was built on the location, until the proper, large church was finished.

=== 20th century ===
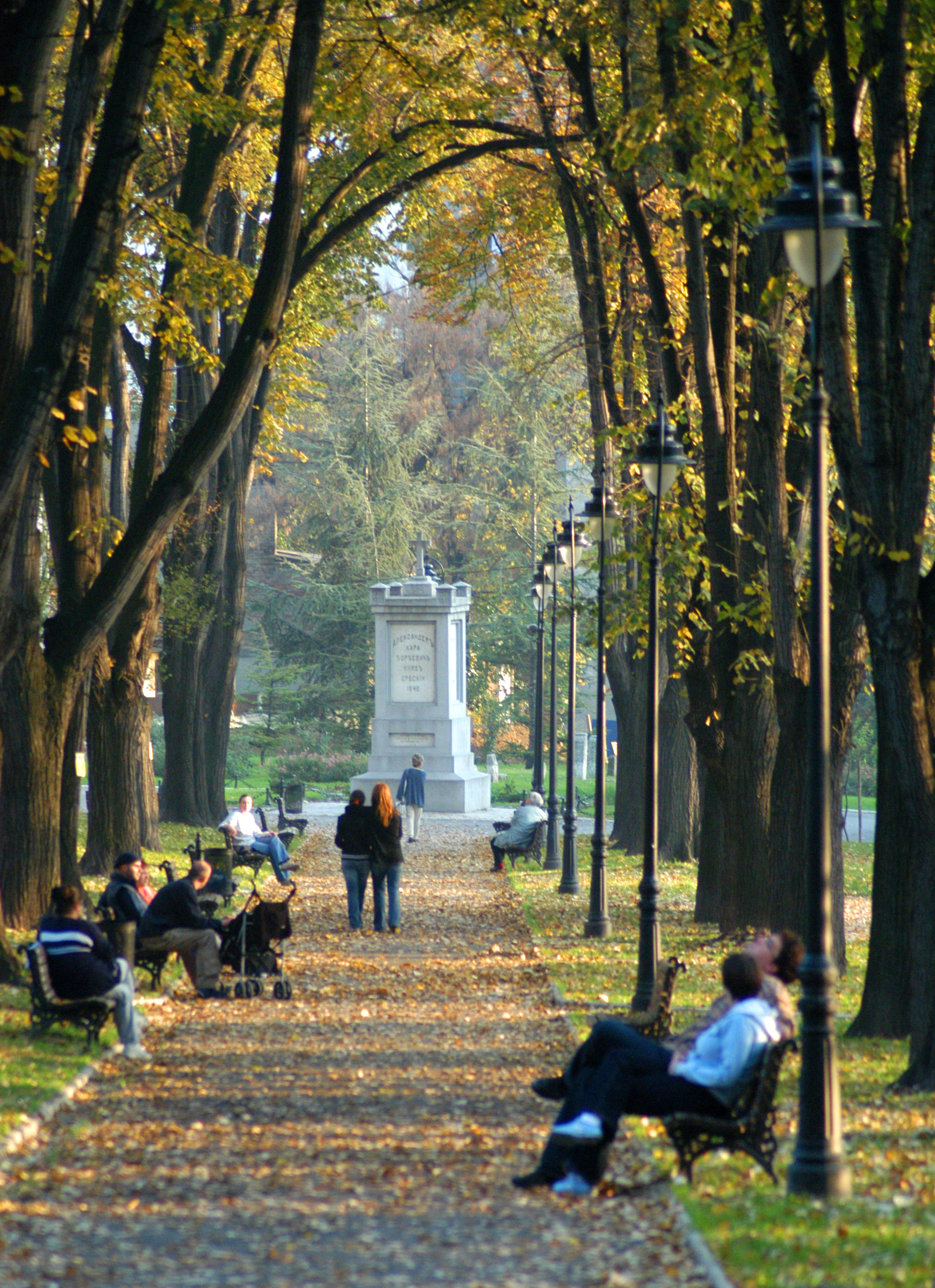
Alley in Karađorđe's Park, leading to the Monument to the Insurgents

Originally outside of the urban core of Belgrade, there were plans for the enlargement of the Karađorđe's Park 1903-1904, in order to mark the centennial of the First Serbian Uprising, which broke out in 1804. The works began only in 1907, after king Peter I Karađorđević became also president of the Society for the Embellishment of the Monuments, Parks and Environment. The society leveled the park's terrain, created pathways, planted grass, lindens, chestnuts and decorative shrubs. The hedge which encircled the park was also planted, while thujas were planted around the monument. This way, more or less, the present borders of the park were set. It covers an area of 2.52 hectares (6.2 acres).

In 1906, an architectural design competition for the future church was announced. Saint Petersburg Academy of Sciences was authorized to judge the project, and it rejected all five applications as not being good enough. A series of wars followed (First Balkan War in 1912, Second Balkan War in 1913, World War I in 1914-1918), which stopped all activities on the construction of the church. Plans were also made to erect a Monument to the Third-Class Reservists in 1914, but due to the outbreak of World War I, the monument was erected on 29 July 1923. After the war, additional monuments were erected in the park. Since in 1916 the Austro-Hungarian forces demolished the Karađorđe monument in Kalemegdan, built in 1913, it was proposed after the war that new monument should be built in the park, close to the tombs of his comrades-in-arms. Also, after the war, the park got its present name. A Monument to French poet Alphonse de Lamartine was erected in 1933 in the park.

After the war, in 1919, the Society was re-established. New design competition was announced in 1926. Beside the church itself, new project was to include buildings of the Patriarchate, Ministry of Religion, Seminary and Great Religious Court. The competition rules stipulated that the new church must be in the style of the Serbo-Byzantine architecture, from the period of Prince Lazar (late 14th century). There were 24 submissions. Though the first and third prize were not awarded, the second-place submission by architect Bogdan Nestorović was selected, but the project itself, the idea of building a church, and its proposed style became a matter of fierce public debate.

Those opposing the church design pushed for the construction of the Vidovdan Temple instead, as the unified South Slav state was formed in 1918 and renamed to Yugoslavia in 1929. Especially vocal was art historian Kosta Strajnić. He, and his supporters, opted for the "Yugoslav, not Serbian Pantheon". They also rejected the medieval Serbian design, as it only symbolized "one tribe". Croatian sculptor Ivan Meštrović, original proponent of the Vidovdan Temple, though on Kosovo, not in Belgrade, supported Strajnić, insisting that the new "Yugoslav style" should be created, instead of the sacral architecture that would fit only one of the denominations. King Alexander Karađorđević publicly didn't support any solution, but privately pushed for the Meštrović's temple. King was a major proponent of integral Yugoslavism and changed state's name to Yugoslavia. Meštrović, as the most important representative of the idea of the "autochthonous Yugoslav art and architecture", was his favorite artist.

After he was elected as the new patriarch of the Serbian Orthodox Church in 1930, Patriarch Varnava pushed for the traditional Serbian appearance of the church and in 1932 ordered the correction of the Nestorović design, which was done by architect Aleksandar Deroko and civil engineer Vojislav Zađin. Still, construction of the church couldn't start for several more years. King Alexander was assassinated in Marseille, France in 1934, and the idea of integral Yugoslavism died with him. The Vidovdan Temple was never built.

Construction of the Church of Saint Sava finally began on 10 May 1935, forty years after the initial idea, and 340 years after the burning of Saint Sava's remains. The cornerstone was laid by Metropolitan Gavrilo of Montenegro, future Serbian Patriarch Gavrilo V. Works were halted by the Axis invasion of Yugoslavia in 1941. The church's foundation had been completed, and the walls erected to the height of 7 and 11 m (23 and 36 ft). The occupying German army used the unfinished church as Wehrmacht 's parking lot, while in 1944 the Red Army, and later the Yugoslav People's Army used it for the same purpose. After that, it was used as a storage area by various companies. The Society for Building of the Church ceased to exist and has not been revived. The remaining granite slabs intended for the construction of the church were used for the building of the Tomb of People's Heroes in 1948, in the Kalemegdan section of the Belgrade Fortress. Children who grew up in the vicinity, including the future President of Serbia Boris Tadić, didn't know the intended purpose of the unfinished construction, so they played inside thinking it was a ruin of some old castle.

There is a small, pavilion-type house in the central part of the Karađorđe's park. There were also two swimming pools in front of it, built during the Interbellum. After World War II, in the 1950s, the venue was adapted into the children's cultural center. In time, the venue was abandoned, and the pools were covered with earth and the flowers were planted. There was another, even smaller, green pavilion, at the plateau behind the house. It was used for selling food and beverages but was demolished later. In September 2019 it was announced that the house will be adapted into the "Momo Kapor Endowment". There is also a stone memorial dedicated to the victims killed in an underground shelter during German bombing of Belgrade on 6 April 1941. Built hastily before the war began, it suffered a direct hit by a bomb and collapsed, killing 192 Belgraders.

Around the old observatory building, a park was planted in the 1950s, retaining the name of Old Zvezdara. In 2010 the name of the park was changed to the Park Milutin Milanković, after Milutin Milanković who worked for decades in the observatory. The building is today the seat of the Center for the Climate Changes "Milutin Milanković". Park was renovated and re-opened under the new name on 28 December 2010.

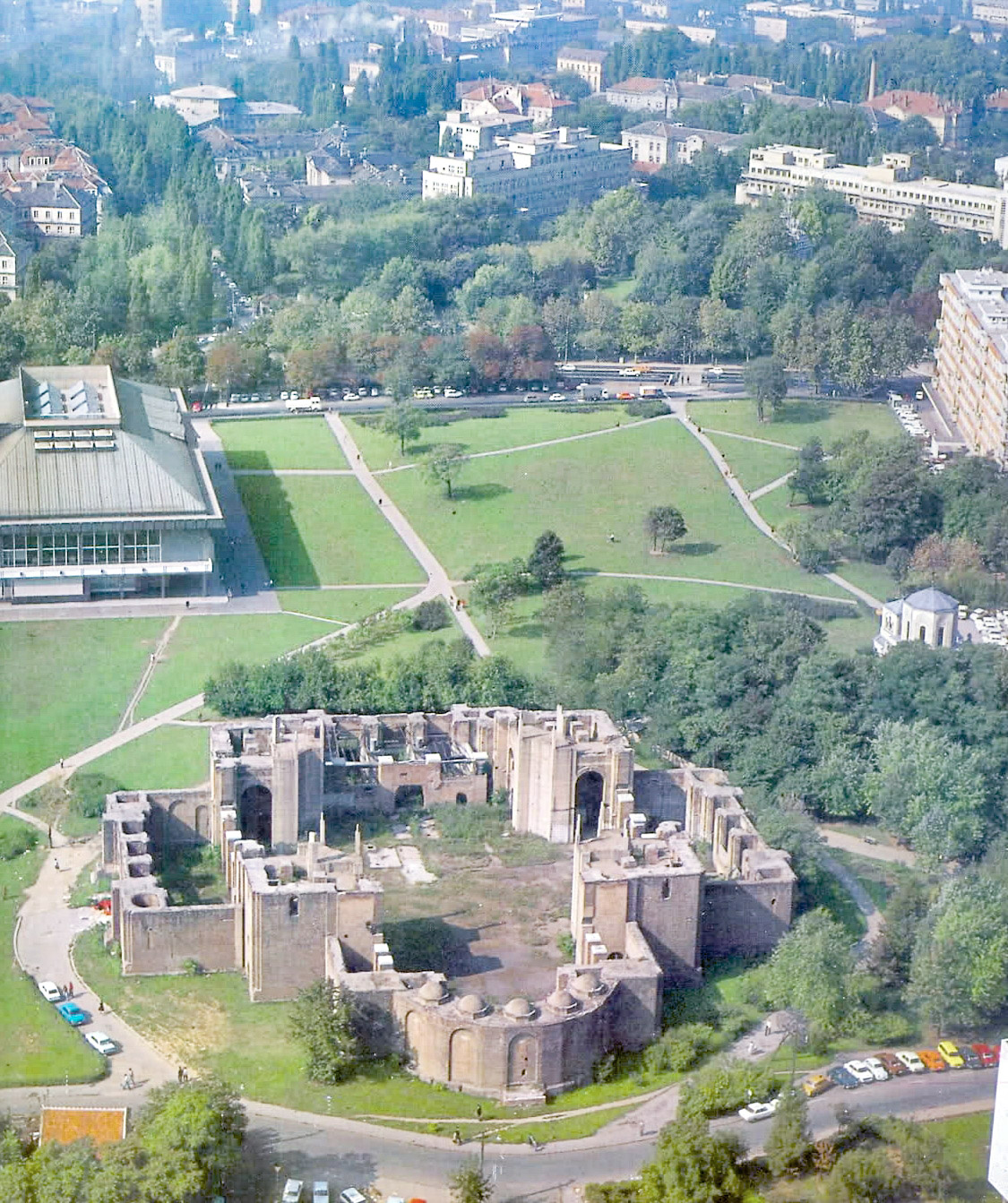
Plateau in 1984, before the construction of the Church of Saint Sava was continued

In 1958, Patriarch German renewed the idea of finishing the Church of Saint Sava. After 88 requests for the continuation of the building, of which 82 were sent to the President of Yugoslavia Josip Broz Tito to which Tito never personally replied. Permission for the continuation of building was granted in 1984 when patriarch talked to Dušan Čkrebić, President of Presidency of Serbia. Construction of the building began again on 12 August 1985. The walls were erected to full height of 40 meters. After the NATO bombing of Serbia in 1999, the works were halted again. Patriarch Pavle, known for his asceticism, thought that such expensive works are inappropriate when people are beaten and impoverished. After becoming a prime minister in 2001, Zoran Đinđić talked with patriarch and convinced him to continue the works.

New building of the National Library of Serbia was built on the plateau. Construction began in 1966, main works were finished in 1972, and the library was officially opened on 6 April 1973, marking the date of 6 April 1941, when German airplanes deliberately bombed old building of the library in the neighborhood of Kosančićev Venac. Designed by Ivo Kurtović, it was the first building in Belgrade specifically built to be a library.

The idea of monument dedicated to Karađorđe was revived in the 1970s. City officials decided to use already existing sculpture by sculptor Sreten Stojanović, who died in 1960. The sculpture was kept chained in the coal cellar of the "Plastika" foundry for decades and Stojanović's family decided to donate the sculpture to the city. However, it was decided not to place the monument in the park named after Karađorđe. Instead, the mound on top of the plateau, at the entry section of the path which leads to the Church of Saint Sava was selected. Thus, the park and the monument are divided by the Nebojšina Street. The monument was dedicated in 1979.

Church's discontinuation of the construction over decades resulted in numerous mistakes, including the plateau surrounding the church which remained unfinished and nonfunctional. Construction of the library in 1973 affected massively the design envisioned in 1926 by Deroko and Nestorović. Three architectural design competitions for arranging the plateau which surrounds the church were organized after World War II. One of the rejected but popular designs was the one by Mihajlo Mitrović and Mario Jobst. Using denivelation of the Liberation Boulevard, they envisioned the wide pedestrian connection with the Park Milutin Milanković across the boulevard. Denivelation would also allow space for construction of two large garages one of which would be used by the church visitors. The square in front of the temple would have green areas on its rim and would include the Alley of the Greats (with monuments to all major members of the medieval Nemanjić dynasty), while the section across the boulevard would be adapted into the green, children area.

After the fourth competition, in 1989, the project by Vladimir Macura and Đorđe Bobić was finally accepted in 1990. As with all the other aspects of the church construction, this one was controversial, too, as it was publicly criticized with disputes even including the litigation. Citizens organized in groups and signed petitions against the project under the slogan "We don't want New Belgrade on Vračar, we want small Montmartre around the church". Bobić explained that the design was influenced by the Kalemegdan Park at Belgrade Fortress. Though it was envisioned by the church and politicians as the churchyard, the authors opted for public space, a green square, or even the park. This urban square was also envisioned as the ceremonial place in case of some important events. The conceptualized "walls" of the square were the National Library on one side, and the Parochial Home (clergy house) and the planned Patriarchate Building on another.

=== 21st century ===
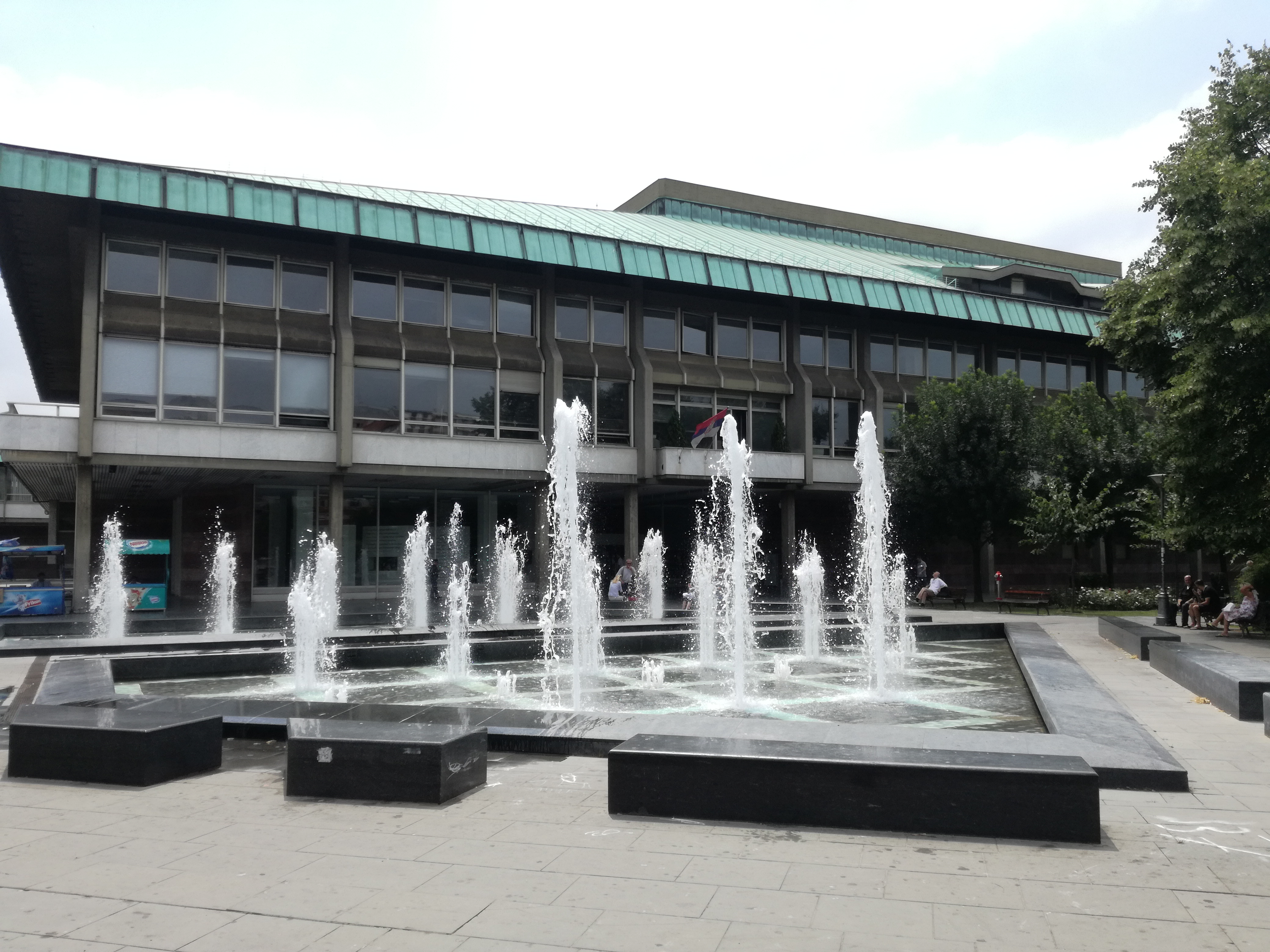
National Library of Serbia

Construction of the Macura-Bobić project finally began in 2003, and the works were ceremonially opened by prime minister Zoran Živković. The works were pushed in order to be finished by February 2004, for celebration of 200th anniversary of the First Serbian Uprising. The plateau section around the church covers some 40,000 m^{2} (430,000 sq ft). Of that, 28,373 m^{2} (305,400 sq ft) developed into the park by 2010.

The Parochial Home, with facade of shining, white stone, is work of Mateja Nenadović and his sons Miloš and Đorđe. Patriarchate Building wasn't built. The Parochial Home was deemed especially problematic, including its location inside the planned green area. It was also deemed too big for its location while the Patriarchate Building, planned in its extension, was deemed even worse as it was to be three times bigger. Old Church of Saint Sava remained dwarfed between the new church and the Parochial Home. The cubical design of the Parochial Home remained almost universally disliked.

The traffic around the plateau was organized in such way that all streets around the church section became one-way streets in order to make circling around it possible. Bus stop for public transportation was envisioned in the Skerlićeva street, below the church, but the public transportation line was never established. A parking lot was built behind the library, but only for the library purpose. The architects rejected the idea of large, either under or above the ground garage, as the regulation didn't allow it at the time, plus, the authors believed that due to the nature of the object, people should come on foot anyway. Smaller underground garages, for Parochial Home and Patriarchate Building were planned, but never built. Krušedolska Street, along which the Patriarchate Building was planned, was to be expanded to become a "major city thoroughfare". This never happened, but the avenue along the street was cut under the pretext of this plan. Traffic solution was also criticized as some urbanists considered that all of those smaller streets behind the church should become pedestrian zones, with galleries, coffee and sweet shops, artistic squares, souvenir shops, etc.

The physical churchyard and the public space are divided by the symbolical "living fence", which consist only of columns, with spaces between. There is a ground floor fountain, made of glass and stone, which covers 400 m^{2} (4,300 sq ft) and is used as the pathway when not operational. The fountain is ornamented with lights. Entire square is used for walking, even on the grassy areas, though there are relatively narrow pedestrian paths made of Jablanica marble. To enhance its "friendly" appearance. the plateau is fully flat, except for the mound with the Karađorđe Monument. Almost 2 m (6 ft 7 in) of earth layers were removed from the plateau to flatten it. Plan included the planting of 400 trees, but after the first ones began to dry soon, this was abandoned. The Russian Orthodox Church donated statue of Saint Sava which was placed on the side facing the street bearing the saint's name. There are two children's playgrounds.

As the result of the accepted plan, even though the new buildings in Vračar and neighboring Neimar were to have only three floors, buildings with six or seven floors were allowed. Urban historians claim that this damaged the inherited urban tissue of Vračar and Neimar. Construction of tall buildings in the narrow, small streets destroyed the neighborhood's ambiance and spirit.

Neglected for a long time, Karađorđev Park went through massive reconstruction and beautification in the early 2000s which completely rejuvenated the park, including new benches, children's playgrounds and candelabra. The idea at the time was to turn it into the first English type park in Belgrade, with added wall around the park, gates with porters and working hours, but after the failed bids for the job, the idea was scrapped.

In 2016, for the 160th anniversary of the birth of Nikola Tesla, a monument to Nikola Tesla was unveiled in the park, between the buildings of the National Library and the Church of St. Sava. It was made by the Serbian sculptor Nikola Janković as a replica of the statue unveiled in 2013 at the Tesla Science Center at Wardenclyffe, New York.

In time, due to the lack of maintenance, the central plateau deteriorated a lot. Numerous granite slabs, used for paving of the churchyard and the pathways, crumbled and fell out, leaving holes. Scandal broke out during the visit of Russian president Vladimir Putin in January 2019 because of the sloppy repairs by the city communal services. Instead of replacing the missing slabs, more slabs were removed, filling the holes with the asphalt concrete creating patches which became laugh of the town.

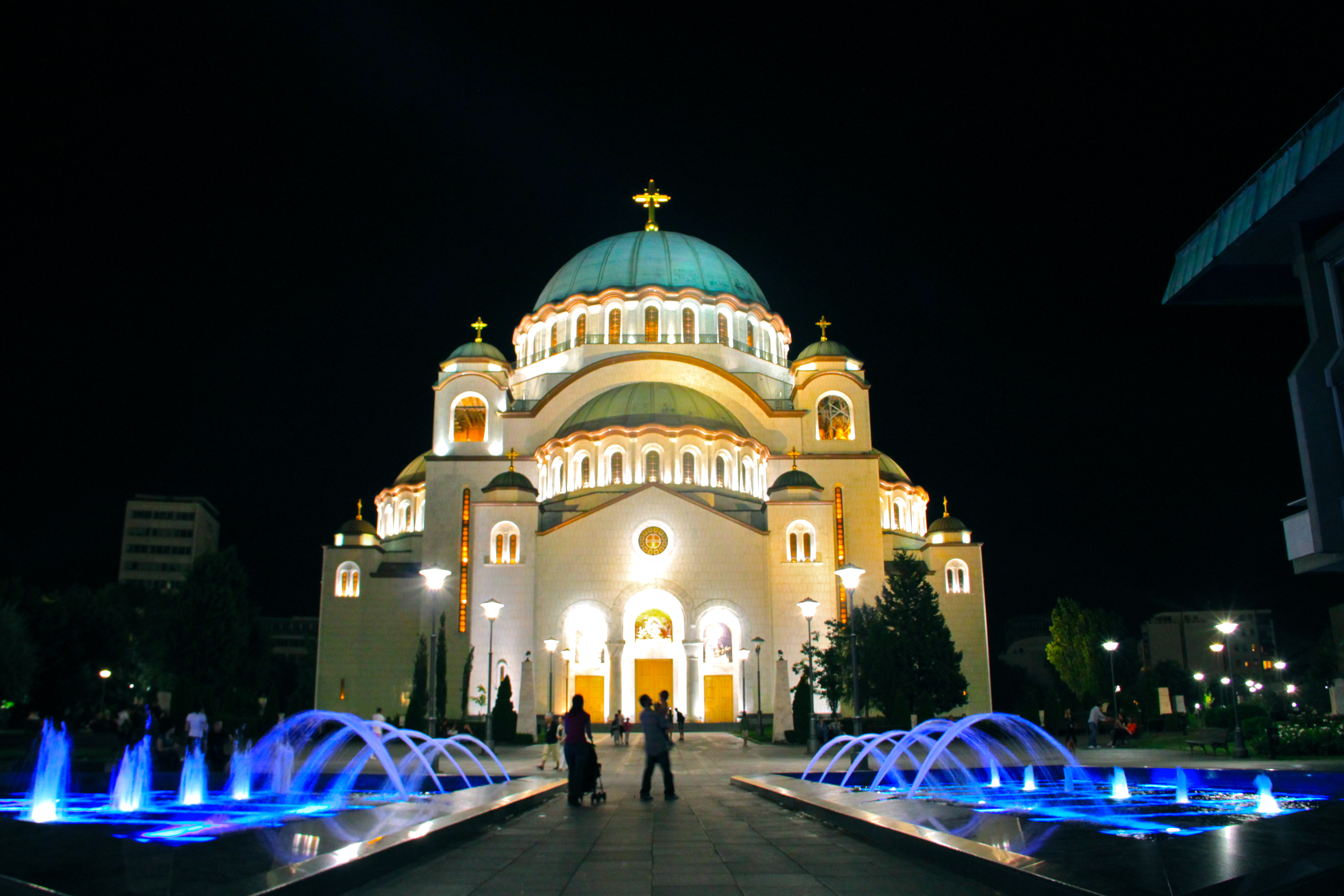
Central section of the plateau

In January 2020, city announced complete redesign of the plateau and the construction of the Patriarchate Building. The project was designed by architects Branislav Mitrović and Dejan Miljković. The project wasn't adopted by the city or any experts commission or jury, but by the Serbian Orthodox Church itself. The central pedestrian pathway is to be expanded and between the library and the new Patriarchate Building an artificial forest, partially growing out of the water, was to be planted. The existing fountain will be dismantled and the new one "will not be a classical fountain". Though city officials claimed there will be more green areas, from the officially presented architectural model showed more trees, but less green areas overall. First, smaller phase on the outskirts of the plateau were planned for October 2020, when the church was to be finally finished.

The design was criticized by the Association of Serbian Architects which stated the planned “forest” would degrade the historical, symbolical and social importance of the plateau by reducing the area to the profane city park. It was noted that mass gatherings organized on the plateau (funeral processions for Patriarch Pavle and prime minister Zoran Điniđić, visit of Russian president Vladimir Putin) showed that the area’s space is inadequate as it is. Massive Patriarchate Building, though planned from the start, is also deemed problematic. It is considered too big and robust for its location. It will also enclose the Krušedolska Street, the tenants in it, and obstruct the view from the numerous street's café's on the park which has a touristic value.

There are calls for keeping the square-like shape of the present plateau or even expanding it as it basically functions as the extended, open air narthex of the church and should have room for as much as possible visitors as the 1990 design unilaterally took care only of local residents' needs, neglecting the area's spiritual and religious character. Some even invoked a decades old design by Mitrović and Jobst instead of 2020 proposal. There were also repeated calls for either international or domestic public design competition, instead of clandestine process by which the church itself selected design for public space.

Underground Skerlićeva garage, under the library and the Skerlićeva Street, has been constantly announced by the city since the 2010s. In September 2022, plan for the construction of four underground floor beneath the library building was announced. The structure at the corner of the Skerlićeva and Nebojšina streets will host depots for library fonds, and exhibition gallery. Work of Branislav Mitrović and Đorđe Alfirević was selected after the design competition in December 2020. Parts of the structure will be completely covered while other sections will be covered with wavy, green roof, at the present level of the plateau. In August 2023 it was announced that works will began in 2023, and the deadline was set for 2024.

By December 2022, almost nothing has been done from the proclaimed first phase of reconstruction, which was to last from 2020 to 2021. Area in front of the church was only partially repaved, but the oak trees were not planted, nor the concrete benches were placed. Phase two, which was to be finished by 2022, didn't even start, while the existing plates deteriorated even further. In November 2023, mayor Aleksandar Šapić announced plateau reconstruction and digging of the garage for 2024, but the construction of the library's depots was omitted.
