= Karađorđe's Park =

Karađorđe's Park Карађорђев парк
- Urban neighbourhood
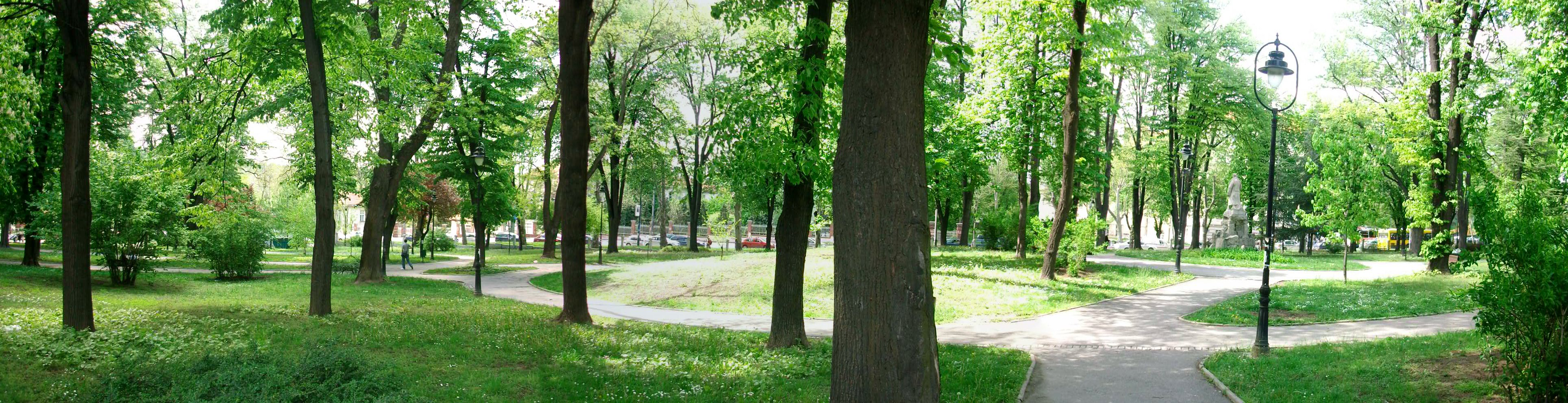
- Park panoramic view

- Location within Belgrade
- Coordinates: 44.795840°N 20.465768°E
- Country: Serbia
- Region: Belgrade
- Municipality: Vračar
- Time zone: UTC+1 (CET)
  - Summer (DST): UTC+2 (CEST)
- Area code: +381(0)11
- Car plates: BG

Karađorđe's Park (Serbian: Карађорђев парк/Karađorđev park) is a public park and an urban neighborhood of Belgrade, the capital of Serbia. While the park itself is located in Belgrade's municipality of Vračar, majority of what is today considered the neighborhood of Karađorđev Park is since 1957 located in the municipality of Savski Venac (though historically still within the old, much larger neighborhood of Vračar).

As the first trees in modern park were planted in 1806, it is considered a predecessor of all green areas in Belgrade. It is sometimes described as the oldest park in Belgrade, but the proper park was planted only in 1848. In 1979, Karađorđev Park was added to Historic Landmarks of Great Importance list, and it is protected by Republic of Serbia.

== Geography ==
Karađorđev Park is located on the southern slope of the Vračar hill, beginning at the Vračar plateau and the National Library of Serbia and ending at the highway interchange of Autokomanda. It is elongated in the north to south direction, bordered by the Boulevard of the Liberation on the west and the Nebojšina street on the east.

Today, Karađorđev Park in the term of neighborhood covers larger area than the park itself. It is bordered by the neighborhoods of Vračar on the north, Neimar on the east and Autokomanda on the south, but the term spread on the area west and northwest of the park (former sections of Zapadni Vračar and Englezovac/Savinac, respectively), so basically all the area along the Boulevard of Liberation from Autokomanda to the Slavija square is today called Karađorđev Park. Across the northernmost top of the park to the west is another park, Park Milutin Milanković.

It is one of the busiest parts of Belgrade with very dense traffic as the Boulevard of Liberation is one of the major routes to downtown Belgrade. Area is mostly non-residential, with public buildings (the Faculty of the veterinarian medicine of the University of Belgrade, many clinics of the Belgrade Clinical Center, Children University Hospital, Belgrade Meteorological Station, etc.).

== History ==
=== 19th century ===
The predecessor to the modern park was a camp set by the Serbian army in 1806 during the siege of Belgrade in the First Serbian Uprising. After the Serbs secured Belgrade, soldiers killed in the battle on the liberation day, 30 November 1806, were buried at this place. In 1806 the first trees were planted at the burial place, chestnut trees and black locusts.

The burial site was arranged as the Insurgents Cemetery in 1848, when the Monument to the Liberators of Belgrade was also erected. The 5.5 m (18 ft) tall memorial was one of the first public monuments in Belgrade. Out of the 50 original tombstones, 12 still survives. The patron of the monument was Aleksandar Karađorđević, the ruling prince of Serbia, and son of the First Serbian Uprising leader and the founder of the Karađorđević royal family, Karađorđe.

After the monument was erected, it was suggested that the park should be planted around it. City officials dismissed the idea, citing lack of necessary funds. One of the first avenues in Belgrade was planted along the Kragujevac Road (modern Liberation Boulevard), in 1848, from which the park developed in time. The planted seedlings were of chestnut trees, and the chestnut alley descending from the original one still survives in the park. By 1887, the cemetery and monument became neglected.

After ascending to the throne in 1889, king Alexander Obrenović ordered for the cemetery to be arranged. The remaining tombs were rearranged, the monument was renovated and the metal fence was placed around it, while the seedlings of black locust were planted in order to form the memorial park. As the king was coming from the Obrenović dynasty, a fierce rival of the former (and future) Karađorđević dynasty, this was seen as the kings attempt to reconcile two ruling families. Also, after creation of this one, numerous other memorial parks began to form throughout Serbia.

=== 20th century ===
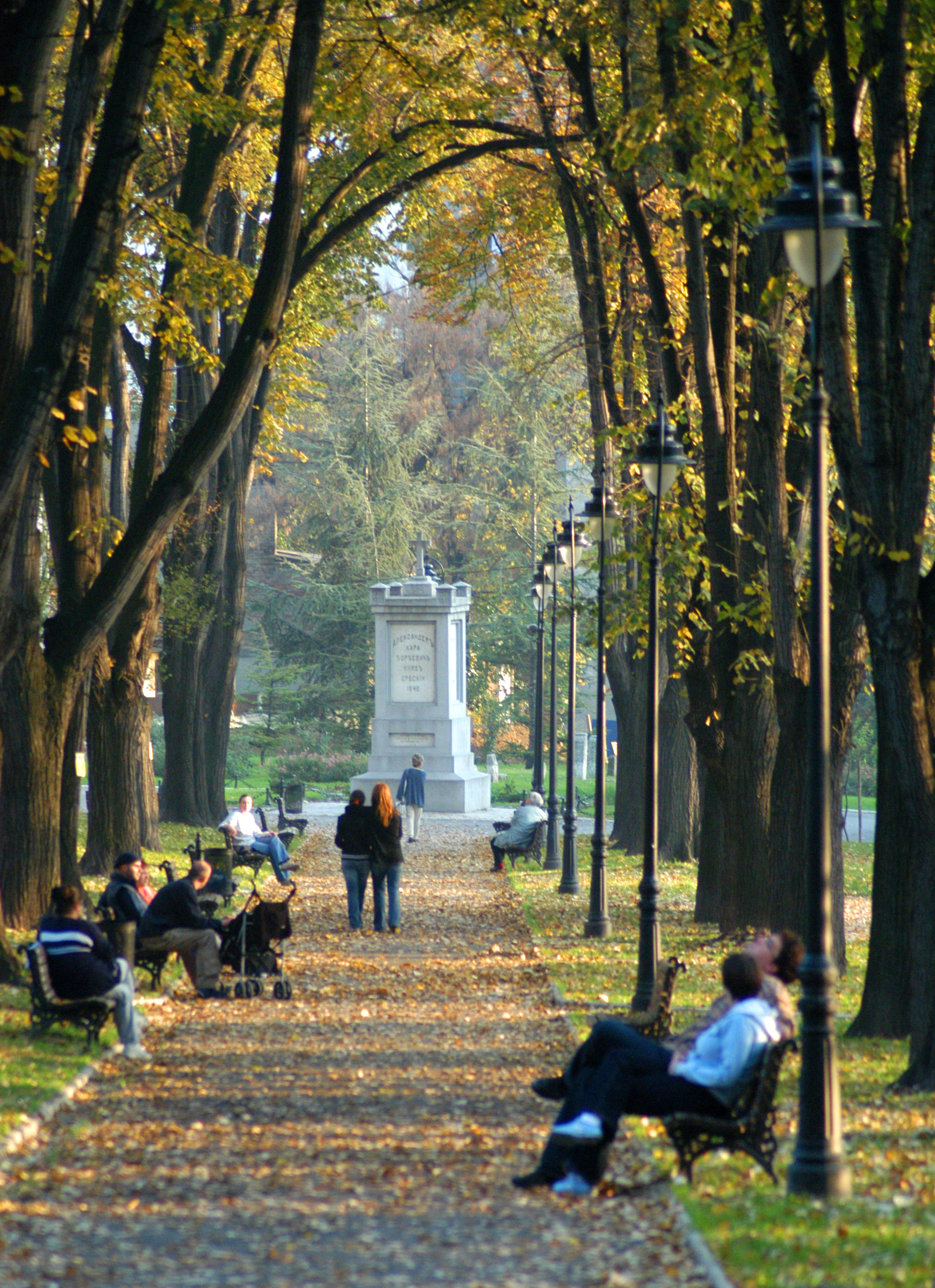
Park alley leading to the Monument and the Cemetery to the Liberators of Belgrade 1806

Another dynastic change followed in 1903, when the Karađorđević dynasty was restored the Serbian throne. Originally outside of the urban core of Belgrade, there were plans for the enlargement of the park 1903-1904, in order to mark the centennial of the First Serbian Uprising, which broke out in 1804. The works began only in 1907, after king Peter I Karađorđević became also president of the Society for the Embellishment of the Monuments, Parks and Environment. The society leveled the park's terrain, created pathways, planted grass, lindens, chestnuts and decorative shrubs. The hedge, which encircled the park was also planted, while thujas were planted around the monument. This way, more or less, the present borders of the park were set. Also, during these works, an artificial hill with gazebo on its top was built.

Plans were made to erect a Monument to the Third-Class Reservists in 1914, but due to the outbreak of World War I, the monument was erected on 29 July 1923. After the war, additional monuments were erected in the park. Since the occupational Austro-Hungarian forces demolished the Karađorđe monument in Kalemegdan, in 1916, it was proposed after the war that new monument should be built in the park, close to the tombs of his comrades-in-arms. Also after the war, the park got its present name. The monument to Karađorđe was erected only in 1979, but it is located across the park. It is situated on the Vračar plateau, on the top of the mound at the entry section of the path which leads to the Church of Saint Sava.

Also during the Interbellum, a monument to Alphonse de Lamartine was erected. At the end of this period, an underground shelter was hastily built under the park. On the very first day of German attack, during the massive bombing of Belgrade on 6 April 1941, the shelter was directly hit, killing almost 200 people in it. Three small, shallow swimming pools in the central section of the park were also built.

After the war, a monument to the International Brigades, dedicated to the fighters in the Spanish Civil War 1936-1939, was placed in the park in 1950. A small, pavilion-type ground floor house in the central part of the park, next to the swimming pools, was built in the 1950s, and in the 1960s, the venue was adapted into the children's cultural center by the Union of Pioneers of Yugoslavia. After the 1960s, when the central pavilion with small pools was adapted for children's use, the park got its present appearance. In 1975 another monument was erected, dedicated to the victims of the 1941 bombing. In 1979 the park was declared a cultural monument.

=== 21st century ===
Neglected for a long time, Karađorđev Park went through massive reconstruction and beautification in the early 2000s which completely rejuvenated the park, including new benches, children's playgrounds and candelabra. The idea at the time was to turn it into the first English type park in Belgrade, with added wall around the park, gates with porters and working hours, but after the failed bids for the job, the idea was put on hold.

The central pavilion was abandoned, the pools were covered with earth in 2003 and the flowers were planted. There was another, even smaller, green pavilion, at the plateau behind the house. It was used for selling food and beverages but was demolished later. In September 2019, it was announced that the house will be adapted into the "Momo Kapor Endowment". First plans for the Momo Kapor's pavilion were made public in March 2023. The pavilion will be preserved (330 m^{2} (3,600 sq ft)), the plateau in front of it will be paved with stone slabs in the color of pavilion's façade (792 m^{2} (8,530 sq ft)), and swimming pools will be revitalized as the "linear shallow decorative water surface" (133 m^{2} (1,430 sq ft)). The fountain will be added to the plateau complex, which will serve as an open air public cultural scene.

On 23 October 2023, a monument to General Božidar Janković was dedicated in the park, close to the Monument to the Liberators of Belgrade. It marked the 120th anniversary of the Society of War Volunteers.

== Characteristics ==
The park covers an area of 2.52 hectares (6.2 acres).

=== Monuments ===
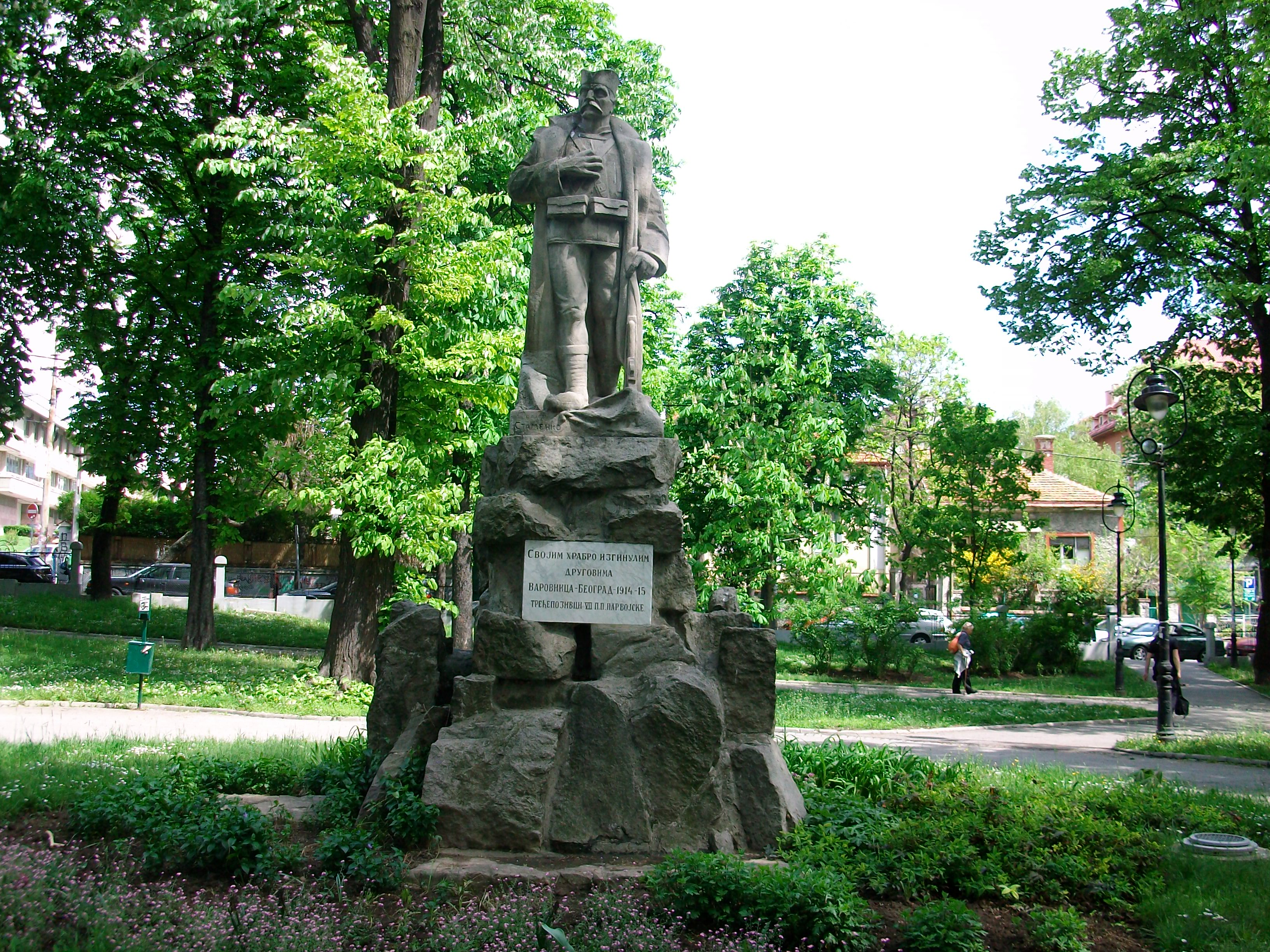
Monument to the third reserve soldiers killed in World War I in 1914-1915, dedicated in 1923

Monuments in the park include:

- "Monument to the Liberators of Belgrade" (Spomenik oslobodiocima Beograda/Споменик ослободиоцима Београда), erected in 1848, the oldest public monument in Belgrade. Dedicated to those killed in the liberation of Belgrade in 1806, it is 547 cm (215 in) high, made of stone with the cover of artificial rock. Erected by the prince Aleksandar Karađorđević, it was renovated by the king Aleksandar Obrenović in 1889.
- "Monument to the third-class reservists" (Spomenik Trećepozivaca/Споменик Трећепозиваца, author Stamenko Đurđević), erected in 1923, dedicated to the soldiers of the final reserve (those unfitting for drafting and summoned only in the extreme situations) killed in the World War I. Made of natural stone, it is 470 m (1,540 ft) high.
- "Monument to Alphonse de Lamartine" (Spomenik Lamartinu/Споменик Ламартину), dedicated to the French poet, erected in 1933 (street dedicated to him, Lamartinova, also begins here).
- Memorial to the International Brigades from the 1936-1939 Spanish Civil War, built in 1950.
- Stone memorial dedicated in 1975 to the victims killed in an underground shelter during German bombing of Belgrade on 6 April 1941. Built hastily before the war began, it suffered a direct hit by a bomb and collapsed, killing 192 Belgraders.
- In 1979, it was decided to erect the Monument to Karađorđe (author Sreten Stojanović), but instead in the park named after him, the monument was erected on the Vračar plateau, across the Nebojšina street, in front of the Temple of Saint Sava.
- Monument to General Božidar Janković, dedicated in 2023.

== See also ==
- Historic Landmarks of Great Importance in Serbia
