= Insurgent (disambiguation) =

Insurgent, insurgents or insurgency can refer to:

- The act of insurgency

== Memorials ==
- Insurgents Cemetery, cemetery in Serbia
- Monument to the Insurgents, monument in Serbia
- Warsaw Insurgents Cemetery, cemetery in Poland

== Other ==
- Insurge Pictures, a low-cost horror film label for Paramount Pictures
- The Insurgents, film
- USS Insurgent (1799), US Navy ship
- Clandestine Insurgent Rebel Clown Army
- Insurgence Records
- Insurgency: Modern Infantry Combat, multiplayer, tactical first person shooter video game using Source engine
- Insurgent (novel), the second book in the Divergent trilogy written by Veronica Roth
  - The Divergent Series: Insurgent, the film adaptation of the Roth novel
- Insurgency (video game), a 2014 multiplayer tactical first-person shooter video game
  - Insurgency: Sandstorm, 2018 sequel to Insurgency
- The Insurgent, American neo-Nazi newspaper

== See also ==
- Insurgentes (disambiguation)
