= Savinac, Belgrade =

Coordinates: 44.800806°N 20.466835°E

Savinac Савинац
- Urban neighbourhood
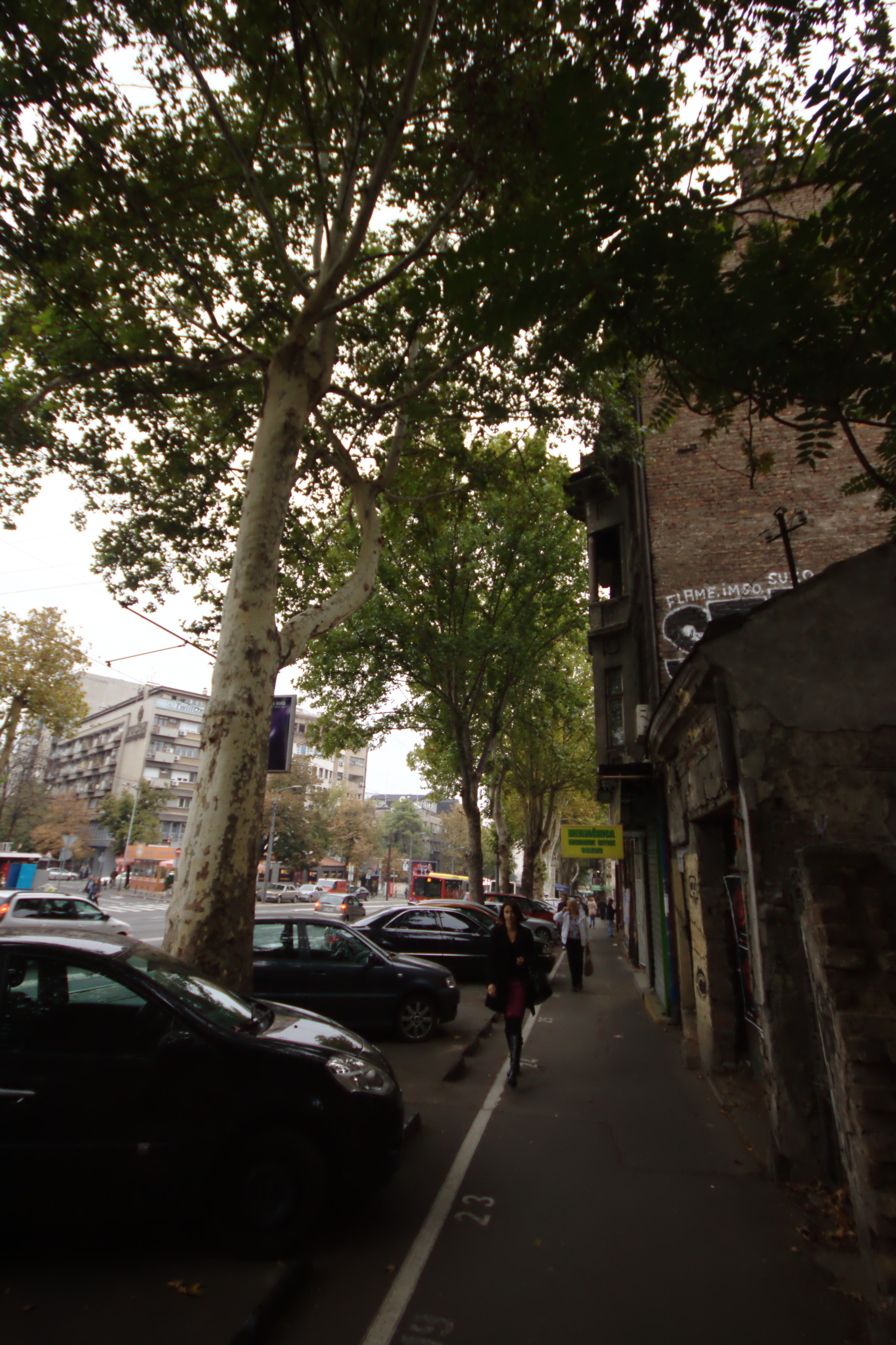
- Bulevar Oslobođenja, view down in the direction of Slavija Square
- Interactive map of Savinac
- Country: Serbia
- Region: Belgrade
- Municipality: Vračar
- Time zone: UTC+1 (CET)
  - Summer (DST): UTC+2 (CEST)
- Postal code: 11050
- Area code: +381(0)11
- Car plates: BG

Savinac (Serbian Cyrillic: Савинац) is an urban neighborhood of Belgrade, the capital of Serbia. It is located in Belgrade's municipality of Vračar.

== Location ==
Savinac is located in the western part of the municipality, on the western slopes of the Vračar hill and stretches from the Slavija square to the Vračar plateau and the Temple of Saint Sava. The main streets in the neighborhood are Svetog Save, Makenzijeva and the Boulevard of the Liberation. Originally, the term stretched west of the boulevard (present Karađorđev Park), but today not many people consider that part of Belgrade as part of Vračar.

== History ==
The neighborhood of Savinac almost entirely overlaps the neighborhood of Englezovac. Construction of the neighborhood began in 1880 when a Scottish businessman and Nazarene Francis Mackenzie bought a large piece of land nearby (which eventually became known as Englezovac, Serbian for Englishman's place), parcelled it out into lots for selling and donated a piece of land to the Serbian Orthodox Church for the construction of the Temple of Saint Sava. "The Society for the Embellishment of Vračar" suggested to Belgrade City Council to rename Englezovac to Savinac (Serbian for Sava’s place) on March 31, 1894. They stated that it is "a shame for the Serbian capital that a whole district is called Englezovac" and inconceivable that a national shrine (Temple of Saint Sava) lie on foreign property.

In narrower sense, Savinac is just the triangular part between the streets of Svetog Save on the east, and the Boulevard of the Liberation, to which term Englezovac didn't apply.

However, the large residential and park complex new name of Savinac was gradually dropped from public usage, and the only remainder of that name was the kafana Savinac which was closed in early 2000s. In the late 1980s, many books and articles on "Old Belgrade" became popular again and so the term Englezovac, at this time already unknown to majority of people, resurfaced, but not Savinac. However, just like Savinac, it didn't get the popular usage, and most of Belgraders still refer to this part of the city as Vračar.

Apart from Savinac, other famous Belgrade kafanas in the neighborhood included Mala Astronomija ("Little Astronomy"), founded in the 1890s, and Orač ("The Plowman"), opened in 1948. Both were located along the Boulevard of the Liberation and demolished in 1996, with Orač being relocated to the Makenzijeva street in the neighborhood of Čubura.

Historically, Savinac represented geographical end of Belgrade, opposite to Kalemegdan, on Belgrade's central line Kalemegdan-Trg Republike-Terazije-Beograđanka-Slavija–Savinac, where central line, tram No 1 used to run, in the first half of the 20th century.
