= Burning of Saint Sava's relics =

1594 Ottoman retaliation against a Serb uprising

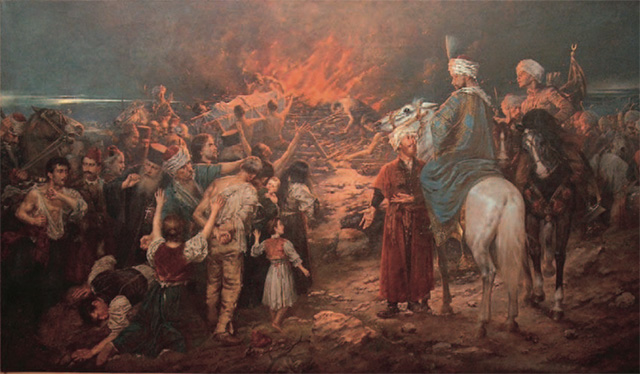
The burning of Saint Sava's relics by the Ottomans, painting by Stevan Aleksić (1912)

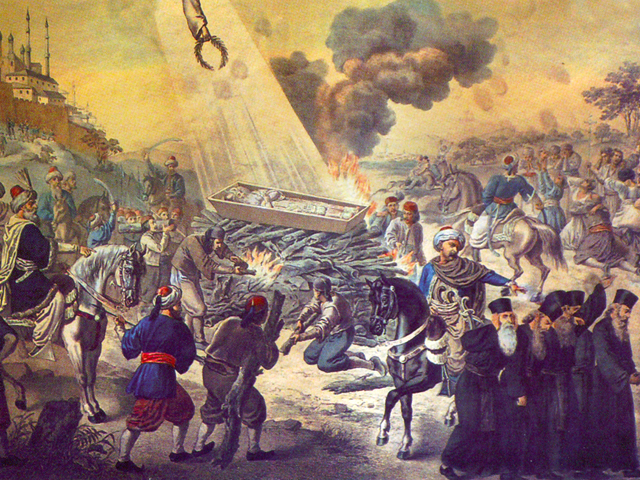
Burning of the relics of St. Sava, by Adam Stefanović and Pavle Čortanović (ca. 1860)

When the Serbs in Banat rose up against the Ottomans in 1594, using the portrait of Saint Sava on their war flags, the Ottomans retaliated by incinerating the relics of St. Sava on the Vračar plateau in Belgrade.

Grand Vizier Sinan Pasha, the main commander of the Ottoman army, ordered that the relics be brought from Mileševa to Belgrade, where he had them burned on 27 April. Monk Nićifor of the Fenek monastery wrote that "there was great violence carried out against the clergy and devastation of monasteries".

The Ottomans sought to symbolically and really incinerate the Serb determination to be free, a determination which had been growing noticeably. Instead, the burning sparked an increase in rebel activity, until the suppression of the uprising in 1595. It is believed that his left hand was saved; it is currently held at Mileševa.

== Commemoration ==
Commemoration of the burning of Saint Sava's relics (Serbian: Спаљивање моштију светога Саве) is now a Serbian Orthodox religious holiday celebrated on 27 April (10 May in the Gregorian calendar).

Archbishop Sava founded the Serbian Orthodox Church, Serbian ecclesiastical law and national literature. He was canonized as a miracle-worker and his religious cult was assimilated into folk beliefs in Ottoman times. The veneration of his relics created tension between Serbs and the occupying Ottomans. In 1774, Sava was proclaimed the patron saint of all Serbs.

In the 19th century the cult was revived in the context of nationalism with the prospect of independence from the Ottomans, "representing and reproducing powerful images of a national Golden Age, of national reconciliation and unification, and of martyrdom for the church and nation". After Serbia regained full independence, a cathedral dedicated to the saint was planned, part of modernization plans of Belgrade. Although the construction board for the church was established in 1895, actual construction of the winning concept, based on Gračanica and Hagia Sophia, began only in 1935.

Construction stopped during World War II and the communist rule, only to be restarted after permission in 1984; as of 2018 the church has been finished and is the second largest Orthodox Church in the world. The site where Saint Sava's relics were burnt, the Vračar plateau, became the new grounds of the National Library of Serbia and the Church of Saint Sava dedicated to the saint, in the 20th century. From its location, the church dominates Belgrade's cityscape, and has become a national symbol.

== Sources ==
Books

- Ćorović, Vladimir (2001) [1997]. "Istorija srpskog naroda" (Internet ed.). Belgrade: Јанус; Ars Libri.
- Mileusnić, Slobodan (2000) [1989]. Sveti Srbi (in Serbian). Novi Sad: Prometej. ISBN 86-7639-478-4. OCLC 44601641.
- Velimirović, Nikolaj (1989). The Life of St. Sava. St. Vladimir's Seminary Press. ISBN 978-0-88141-065-5.

Journals

- Bakić-Hayden, Milica (2010). "Saint Sava and the power (s) of spiritual authority" (PDF). Serbian Studies. 24 (1). NASSS: 49–62. doi:10.1353/ser.2012.0015. S2CID 145778617. Archived from the original (PDF) on 2016-08-10.
- Milanović, Ljubomir (2010). "Materializing authority: the church of Saint Sava in Belgrade and its architectural significance" (PDF). Serbian Studies. 24 (1). NASSS: 63–81. doi:10.1353/ser.2012.0018. S2CID 144270672. Archived from the original (PDF) on 2016-08-10.
