= Karađorđe Monument, Belgrade =

Monument in Belgrade, Serbia

Coordinates: 44°47′54″N 20°28′00″E

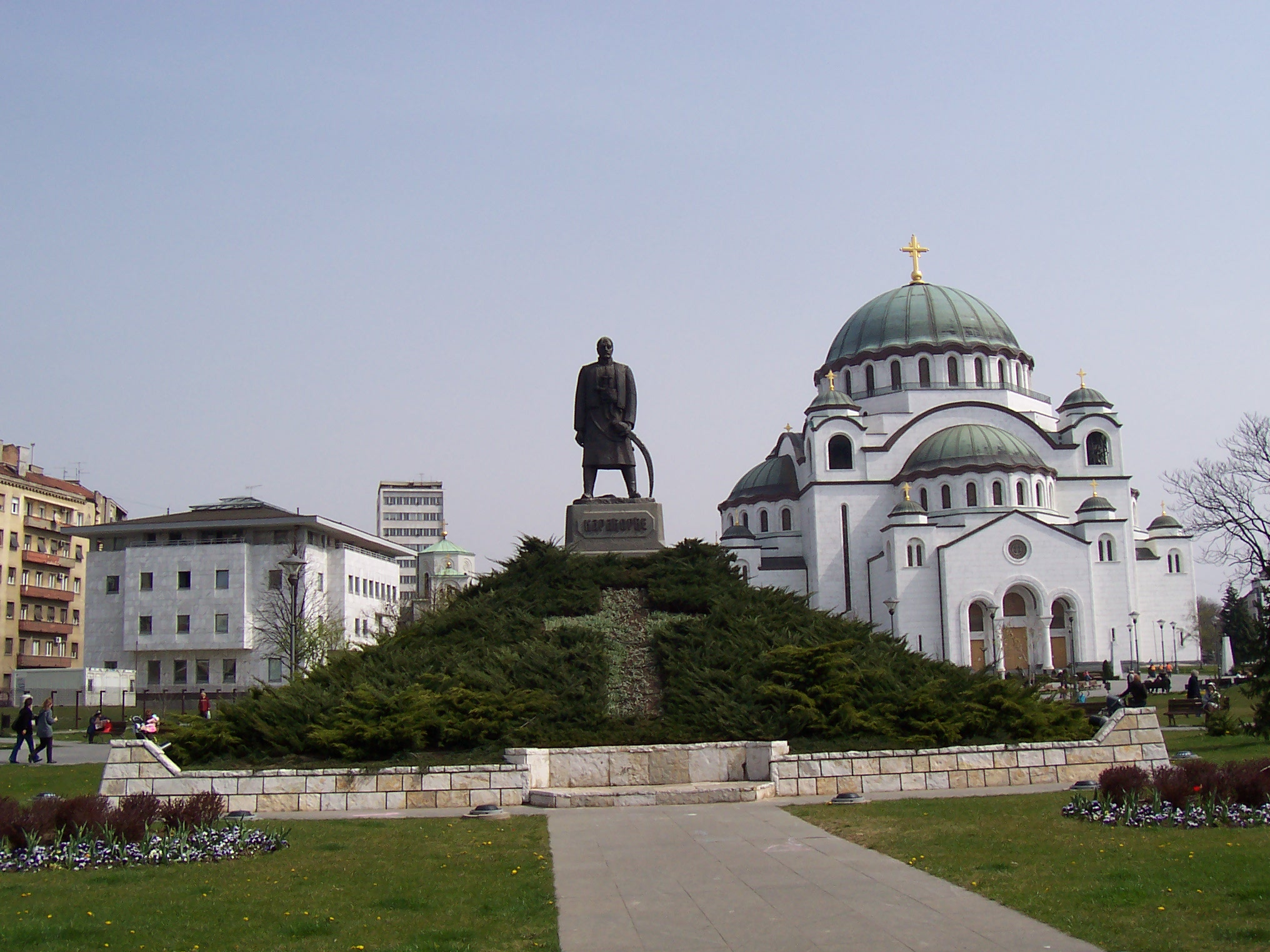
Karađorđe Monument on the Vračar plateau, with the Saint Sava Church behind

Karađorđe Monument (Serbian: Споменик Карађорђу, romanized: Spomenik Karađorđu) refers to either of two monuments in Belgrade, the capital of Serbia. The older one was built in 1913 in the Greater Kalemegdan section of the Belgrade Fortress and demolished by the occupying Austro-Hungarian forces in 1916 during World War I. The present monument was dedicated in 1979 on the Vračar plateau.

== 1857 proposal ==
The idea for the monument to Karađorđe, leader of the First Serbian Uprising from 1804 to 1813, appeared for the first time in 1853. At the time, autonomous Serbia was ruled by the Karađorđević dynasty. Proposed location was Terazije, the central city square. First official proposal came in 1857, from Toma Vučić-Perišić, one of the leaders of the Defenders of the Constitution. Though the monument to the almost mythical hero was meant to homogenize the nation after centuries old Ottoman occupation, as one of the most powerful men in the state at the time, Vučić-Perišić wasn't much interested into celebrating the ruling dynasty, as ruling prince Alexander Karađorđević was a ceremonial ruler. The idea for the monument was to be a symbol and clear message to the exiled ruling prince Miloš Obrenović (who organized assassination of Karađorđe in 1817), from the opposing Obrenović dynasty which was replaced by the Karađorđević dynasty in 1842.

Though Ottoman administration over Serbia was limited at the time, it was still strong enough to prevent building of the monument. They would not allow a memorial to the bitter enemy of their empire. After the Saint Andrew's Day Assembly in 1858–1859, the dethroned Miloš Obrenović was restored to power and the idea of erecting a monument to Karađorđe was abandoned.

== 1913 monument ==
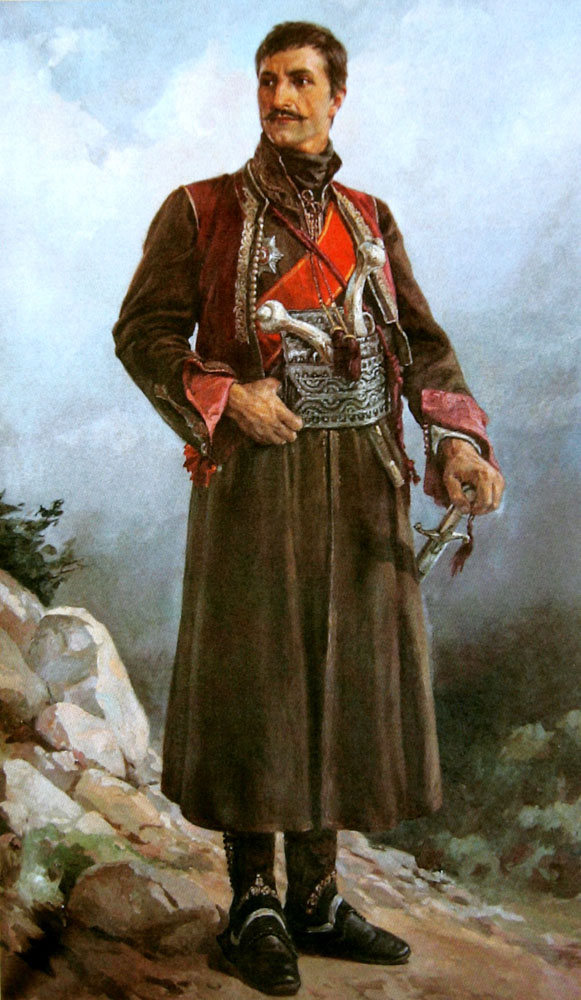
Đorđe Petrović Karađorđe (1768–1817), leader of the First Serbian Uprising from 1804 to 1813 and progenitor of the Karađorđević dynasty which ruled Serbia and Yugoslavia 1842–1858 and 1903–1945

In 1903 the Karađorđević dynasty again came to the throne. The glorification of Karađorđe was also restored and the idea of the monument resurfaced as, this time, Serbia was an independent state so the monument could be built. The memorial was envisioned as a strong propaganda and rhetoric tool for the newly reinstated dynasty. Propaganda was needed both due to the tragic occurrence by which the Obrenović dynasty was removed (bloody May Coup), and the ensuing decisive confrontation with the remains of the Ottoman Empire in the Balkans.

Ministry of War announced the design competition for the monument on 21 September 1908. The chosen location was the Great Kalemegdan section of the Kalemegdan Park, in the Belgrade Fortress. Propositions stipulated that the artists must be from Serbia, that monument has to be in the straightforward military-historical vein, and that Karađorđe's appearance must be livelier and more imposing than the surrounding figures. Exhibition of the applied designs was organized in April 1909. First prize went to artist Paško Vučetić. This wasn't much of a surprise, as Vučetić was sort of the royal painter, who already made two portraits of King Peter I, which was considered a great privilege.

From this moment on, one of the "most bitter artistic polemics in our society" ensued. "Večernje Novosti" wrote that Vučetić's model is actually a "chunk of detached bolder". Art historian Vladimir Petković was one of the major opponents of the project. Poet and diplomat Jovan Dučić praised the design, saying it "radiates with thoughtfulness". However, after the monument was unveiled, he amended his stand a bit. The pedestal was sculptured in Belgrade, while the bronze parts of the composition were cast in Rome.

The monument was dedicated on 24 August [O.S. 11 August] 1913, commemorating the return of the Serbian army from the Balkan Wars. Members of the royal household were present at the dedication, including King Peter I, Karađorđe's grandson. One of the newspapers gave a detailed overview of the monument: "Several soldiers from the First Serbian Uprising are climbing up. One of them is taking in his arms a baby given to him by the peasant women, maybe his wife. To kiss the baby for the last time in his life. Old guslar slowly walks after the rebels, with gusle in his bag, who will boost the spirit of the Serbian avengers in the leafy woodlands. On top is Karađorđe. On his one side are the sabre and the rifle, while on the other is Vila with the flag and the wreath".

According to the newspaper reports from the event, after the king removed the white sheet unveiling the monument, the crowd was silent, with occasional whisper, which was reported as the major dislike of the design. Polemics about the monument only intensified after the dedication, this time being predominantly negative. Moša Pijade, a student of Vučetić, was one of the main objectors ("bronze abomination, disgrace for Serbia which should be demolished with the pickaxe"). Public considered that Karađorđe's appearance is not heroic enough, that it doesn't resemble the fierce rebellion leader and having unnatural facial expression, while some openly called for the "patched" monument to be demolished. Author Branislav Nušić was member of the Board for the Building of the Monument. When on the unveiling ceremony he was asked by the Prince George, king's oldest son, what he thinks of the monument now, Nušić replied he now prays to be a member of the Demolition Board. As prince and his entourage laughed out loud, the reporters concluded that the royal family is not happy with the monument either. Writer and journalist Dragutin Ilić liked the monument, calling the composition poetic.

During the Austro-Hungarian occupation of Belgrade in World War I, the Austrians planned to erect the bronze monument to their emperor, Franz Joseph I on the very spot of the Karađorđe's monument. In 1916 they dismantled the monument, claiming it was damaged in fighting. Then they melted it to reuse the bronze. When the massive Franz Joseph monument was being shipped to Belgrade in 1918, Serbian forces captured the ship and confiscated the statue. It was later melted into three church bells, largest of which tolls from the belltower of the Ružica Church, within the fortress.

The monument was so generally disliked, that it was never reconstructed. Instead, a Monument of Gratitude to France was dedicated on its location, on 11 November 1930. The only remaining part of the monument complex is the figure of old guslar. It is exceptionally preserved so city authorities decided to return it to Kalamegdan and to place it close to the Monument of Gratitude to France and its previous location, by the end of 2019. Archaeologist and Belgrade Fortress researcher Marko Popović suggested return of the guslar's figure back in 2000. As the solitary sculpture "Blind Guslar", it was ceremonially placed close to the monument's original location on 11 November 2020. The bronze statue is 2 m (6 ft 7 in) tall and stands on the 40 cm (16 in) tall stone plinth. Few minor interventions had to be done by the sculptor Zoran Kuzmanović. They include recasting parts of the guslar's little finger, caine and gusle.

== 1979 monument ==
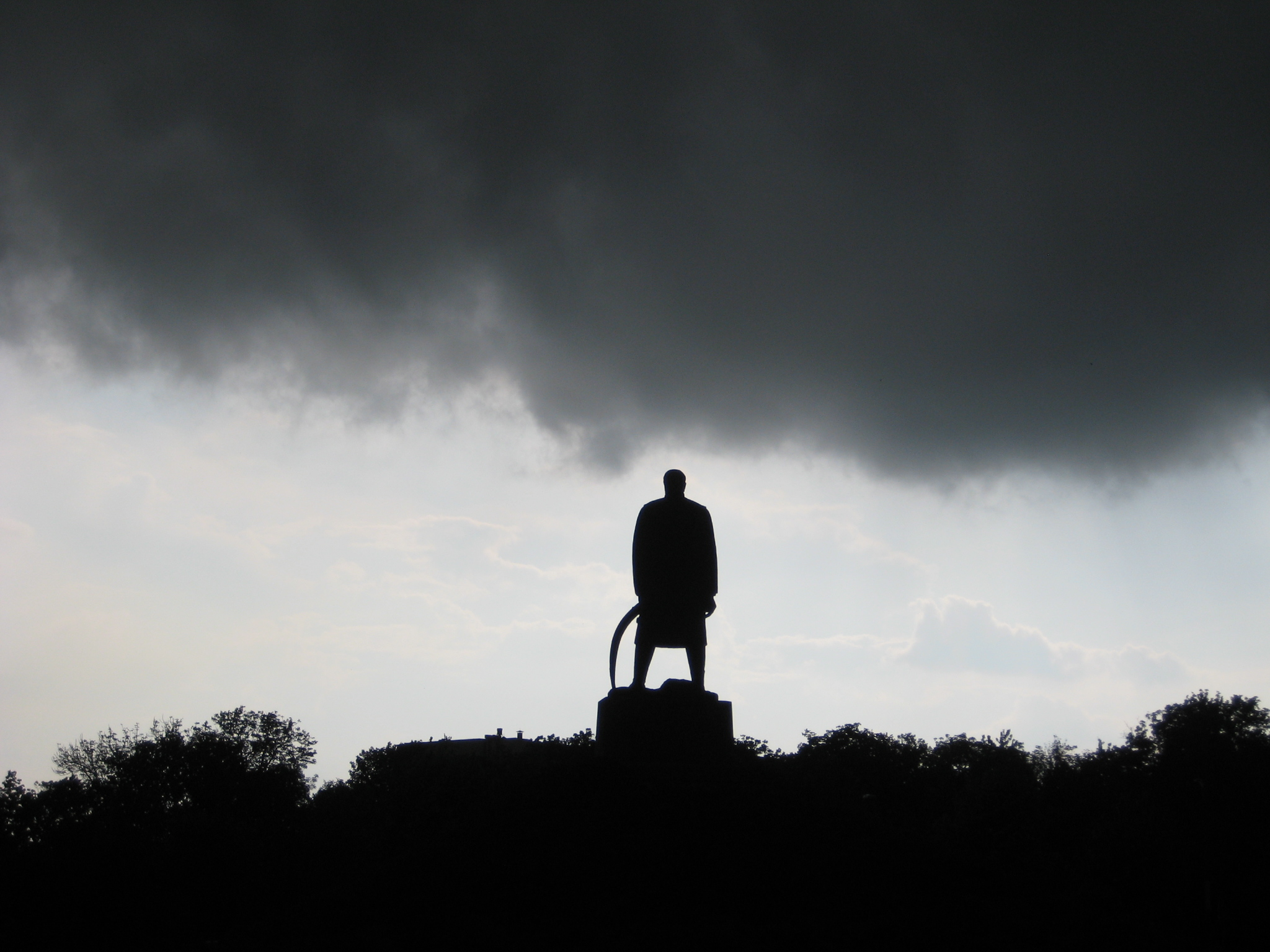
Karađorđe Monument in the cloudy sunset

The Socialist Union of Serbia concluded that the monument to Karađorđe should be erected somewhere in the town. The Union didn't discuss any details, but they conveyed the decision to the City Assembly of Belgrade. Neither the state-granted funds, nor the city had money as the monument was not planned. City's Institute for the Protection of the Cultural Monuments selected the location, a small mound on top of the Vračar plateau. They decided to use already existing sculpture by Sreten Stojanović, who died in 1960. The sculpture was kept chained in the coal cellar of the foundry "Plastika" for decades and Stojanović's family decided to donate the sculpture to the city. The statue was cast in the lost-wax casting process (cire perdue).

City then organized the browning of the statue, founding of the mound and installation of the piles, finding sponsors for the works. The granite pedestal turned out to be a problem. A slab of the size and quality stipulated by the design, couldn't be found in Yugoslavia, nor could it be produced in such a short period of time. In the end, the smaller pedestal from the Aranđelovac stone was reluctantly chosen. Architect Zoran Jakovljević projected the pedestal design.

The monument was dedicated in 1979. The bronze monument is 3.2 m (10 ft) tall. It is situated on top of the mound. In time, it became one of the most recognizable monuments in Belgrade, especially as the works on the church progressed and the plateau was architecturally arranged, but also due to its monumental appearance being elevated from the surrounding terrain.

The monument is located at the crossroads of the Boulevard of Liberation, Nebojšina and Krušedolska streets. Behind (that is, east) of the monument is the Church of Saint Sava, which is connected to the monument via the park-style plateau and fountains. To the south is the National Library of Serbia. Across the Nebojšina Street is the northernmost tip of the Karađorđev Park, while further across the boulevard is the Milutin Milanković Park.
