= Insurgentes =

Insurgentes is a Spanish word meaning insurgents and may refer to:

- Avenida de los Insurgentes, the longest avenue in Mexico City
  - Insurgentes metro station, subway station in Line 1, Mexico City
  - Insurgentes Sur metro station, subway station in Line 12, Mexico City
  - Teatro de los Insurgentes, theater in Mexico City
    - Teatro Insurgentes (Mexico City Metrobús), a BRT station in Mexico City
  - Glorieta de los Insurgentes, a roundabout station in Mexico City
    - Glorieta de los Insurgentes (Mexico City Metrobús), a BRT station in Mexico City
- Insurgentes (album), 2008 album by British artist Steven Wilson, or its title song
- Insurgentes (Mexibús), a BRT station in Ecatepec, State of Mexico
- El Insurgente, a commuter railway system serving Mexico City and Toluca, Mexico

== See also ==
- Insurgent (disambiguation)
