= Englezovac =

Englezovac Енглезовац
- Urban neighbourhood
- Location within Belgrade
- Coordinates: 44°48′08″N 20°28′01″E
- Country: Serbia
- Region: Belgrade
- Municipality: Vračar
- Time zone: UTC+1 (CET)
  - Summer (DST): UTC+2 (CEST)
- Area code: +381(0)11
- Car plates: BG

Englezovac (Serbian Cyrillic: Енглезовац) is an urban neighborhood of Belgrade, the capital of Serbia. It is located in the Belgrade's municipality of Vračar.

== Location ==
Englezovac is located in the western part of the municipality, on the western slopes of the Vračar hill and stretches from the Slavija square to the Vračar plateau and the Temple of Saint Sava. The main streets in the neighborhood are Svetog Save, Makenzijeva and the Boulevard of the Liberation. Originally, term stretched west of the boulevard, but today not many people consider that part of Belgrade as part of Vračar.

== History ==
Construction of Englezovac started in 1880 after a Scottish businessman and Nazarene Francis Mackenzie bought a large piece of land in 1879 from Đorđe Simić, Serbian politician and prime minister, for 7,500 ducats. Land was bounded by the modern streets of Beogradska, Njegoševa, Molerova, Makenzijeva (named after Mackenzie), Katanićeva, Bore Stankovića, Skerlićeva and Bulevar oslobođenja. Previously known as the Simićev Majur (”Simić's farm”), the area eventually became known as Englezovac, Serbian for Englishman's place), as the term Englishman is, even today, universally used in colloquial speech for any inhabitant of the Great Britain.

As the Simićev Majur was a marshy area, Mackenzie originally planned to drain the land and organize agricultural production. He changed his plans later, hiring architects who parceled it out into lots for selling and cut the streets through. Mackenzie then sold the lots. Soon numerous houses were built, mostly one or two-floors high. Larger edifices included the Hall of Peace (Sala mira), in which the cult cinema "Slavija" was situated later. After the urbanization, Englezovac included the area between the streets of Njegoševa and Svetog Save.

He also donated a piece of land to the Serbian Orthodox Church for the construction of the Temple of Saint Sava. "The Society for the Embellishment of Vračar" suggested to Belgrade City Council to rename Englezovac to Savinac (Serbian for Sava's place) on 31 March 1894. They stated that it is "a shame for the Serbian capital that a whole district is called Englishman's" and inconceivable that a national shrine (Temple of Saint Sava) lie on foreign property.

In the late 1980s, many books and articles on "Old Belgrade" became popular again and so the term Englezovac, at this time already unknown to majority of people, resurfaced. However, just like Savinac, it didn't get the popular usage, and most of Belgraders still refer to this part of the city as Vračar.
