= First Serbian Observatory =

Monument in Belgrade

The building of the first Serbian Observatory
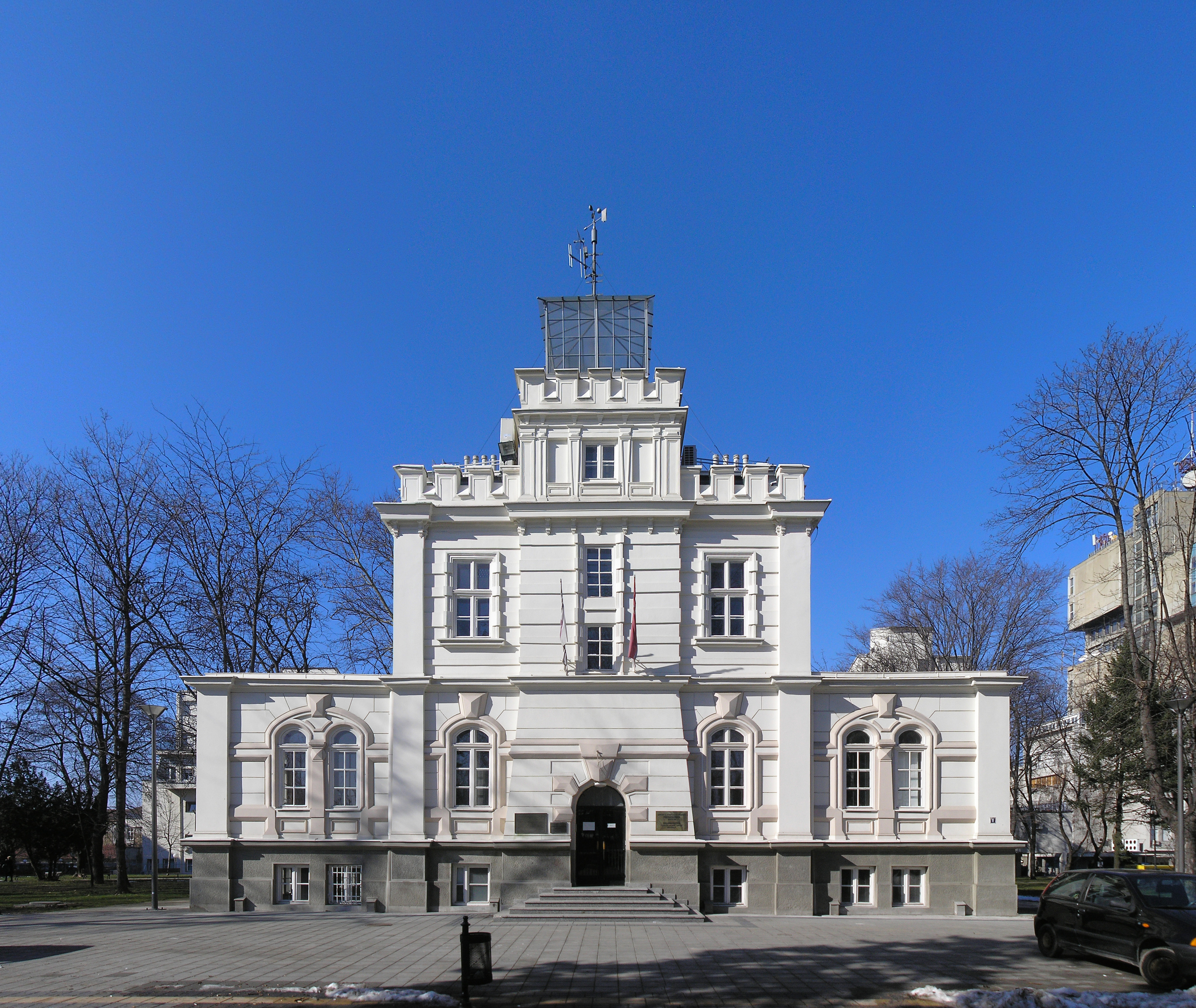
- The building of the first Serbian Observatory
- Interactive map of the The building of the first Serbian Observatory area

General information
- Architectural style: Romanticism
- Location: 8, Bulevar oslobođenja, Belgrade, Serbia
- Coordinates: 44°47′55.98″N 20°27′52.27″E
- Construction started: 1890
- Completed: 1891

Design and construction
- Architect: Dimitrije T. Leko

The First Serbian Observatory is located in Belgrade, in 8, Bulevar oslobođenja, and it has the status of a cultural monument of exceptional importance.

== History and appearance ==
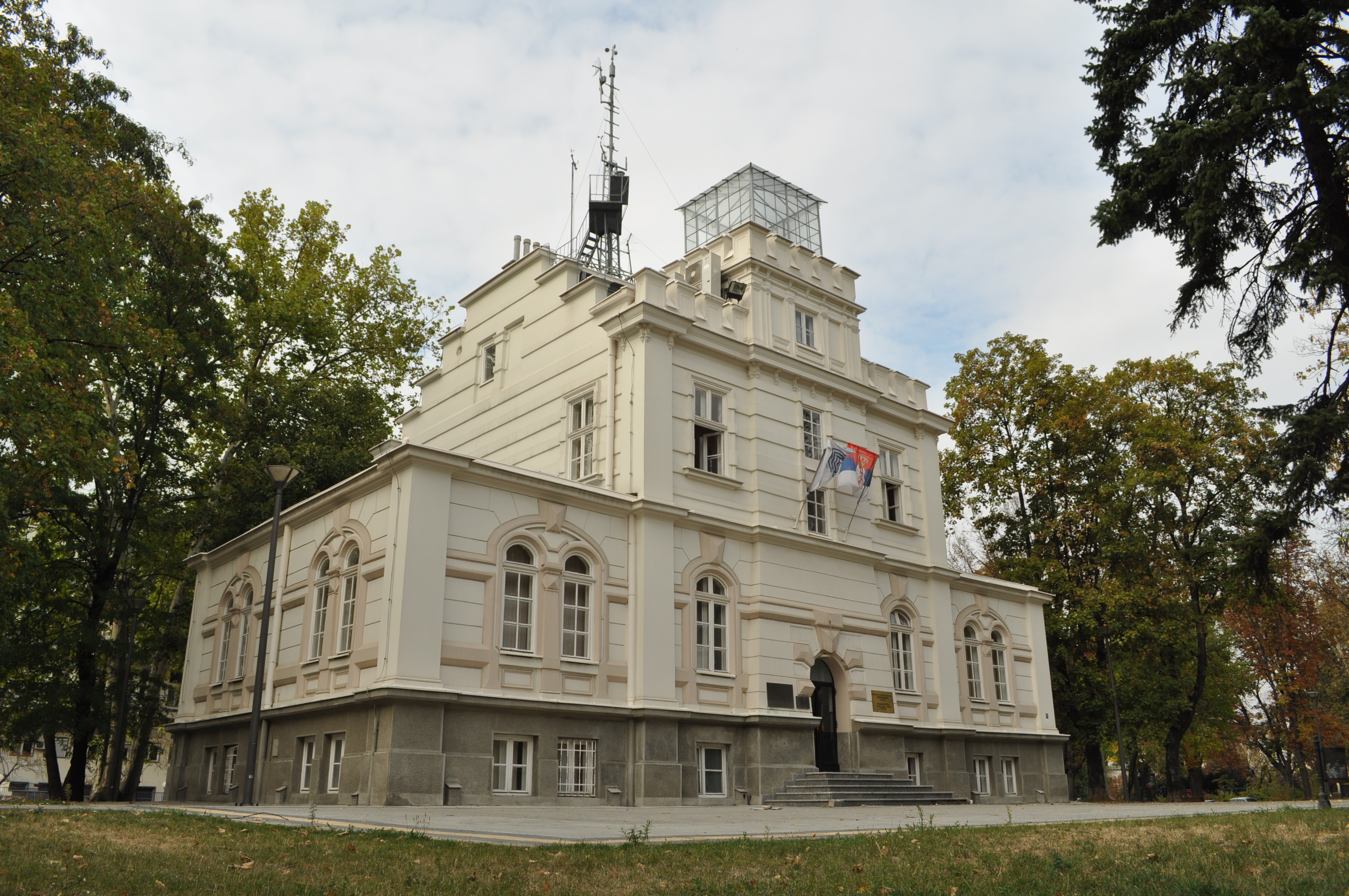
The First Serbian Observatory, Belgrade

The building of the Meteorological Observatory was built in 1890–1891 as a pavilion with a floor of a smaller surface area than the ground floor, according to the project by the architect Dimitrije T. Leko, and according to a drawing of its founder and manager, professor Milan Nedeljković. Thanks to his efforts, the observatory was equipped with the latest measuring instruments. Its construction coincided with the emergence of these types of institution in the developed countries of Europe.

The interest in meteorology in Serbia began in the mid-19th century. It is very likely that Vladimir Jakšić, professor at the Belgrade Lyceum and Advanced School, founder of statistics, was the first man who started to deal with meteorology in Serbia. After returning to Belgrade in 1847, having completed his education in Germany and Austria, he began to perform daily meteorological research and measurement in Belgrade.

In his diaries meteorological observations, climatology and statistical work, Јakšić left valuable information on climate and hydrological phenomena of his time. In the 1880s, the Department of Astronomy and Meteorology was established at the Advanced School. The arrival of Milan Nedeljković as the professor of astronomy and meteorology is one of the most important moments in the development of science in Serbia.

"Milan Nedeljković, as a brilliant connoisseur of the then state of meteorology in the world and its great importance in the field of scientific activity, as well as in the development of various branches ofeconomic activity, developed tireless activity on the establishment of a modern observatory for meteorological and astronomical observations and tests and on the establishment and maintenance of systematic meteorological observations throughout the territory of Serbia, continuing the pioneering work of Vladimir Jakšić, his predecessor in this field." The first task that was considered important by Milan Nedeljković was erecting an observatory and meteorological stations in Serbia. Due to his efforts, the Minister of Education decided to erect a provisional meteorological and astronomical observatory for the Kingdom of Serbia in a private house at Vračar in 1887. For this purpose, the house of G. Geisler at southwestern Vračar was used, now in number 63, Svetozar Marković Street.

Milan Nedeljković continued to lead live action to raise a permanent observatory of the Advanced School, so the land for its erecting was obtained from the Belgrade municipality, on the highest point at Western Vračar. Another important thing that had to be solved after acquiring land was to raise the building. To this end, the Ministry of Education sent the drawing of the building to the Ministry of Construction, i.e. architectural department of this ministry, pursuing the efforts of Milan Nedeljković, and the department drew up a detailed plan of the building. The building was finally built in 1891 by the project of the аrchitect Dimitrije T. Leko.

Carried out in the spirit of Romanticism, it was specially designed and built for the meteorological and аstronomical observations, which also caused its particular architectural design. Set freely in space, the building is conceived as a pavilion-type building, around which a park was formed. The main facade ends with tines that form the attic and the terrace railing, placed above a portion of the attic and the other facades end with stepped gables. The ground floor windows and the front door are arched. The facade decoration consists of window frames and bulged horizontal strips on the walls.

Conservation and restoration works were completed in 1987–1988.

The building of the meteorological observatory was built almost at the same time as in the developed countries of Europe. At the time of erection, it was the first building purposefully dedicated to meteorological and astronomical observations in Serbia.

Meteorological Observatory trained the best personnel in the area, and as a pedagogical center, along with the Department of Meteorology and Astronomy at the Advanced School, provided a number of recognized and known experts. The historical significance of this building is multifaceted. First of all, the meteorological observatory represents the achievements of the society of its time. Taken as a whole, the building is a successful authorial, architectural achievement of Dimitrije T. Leko and a significant achievement of Serbian architecture. Because of its cultural-historical, social and architectural value, the building of the First Serbian Observatory in 8, Bulevar оslobođenja is declared as cultural property of exceptional importance in 1979.

== See more ==
- List of cultural monuments in Belgrade
