= Monument and Cemetery to the Liberators of Belgrade, Vračar =

Coordinates: 44°47′40.93″N 20°27′59.13″E

Monument and the Cemetery to the Liberators of Belgrade
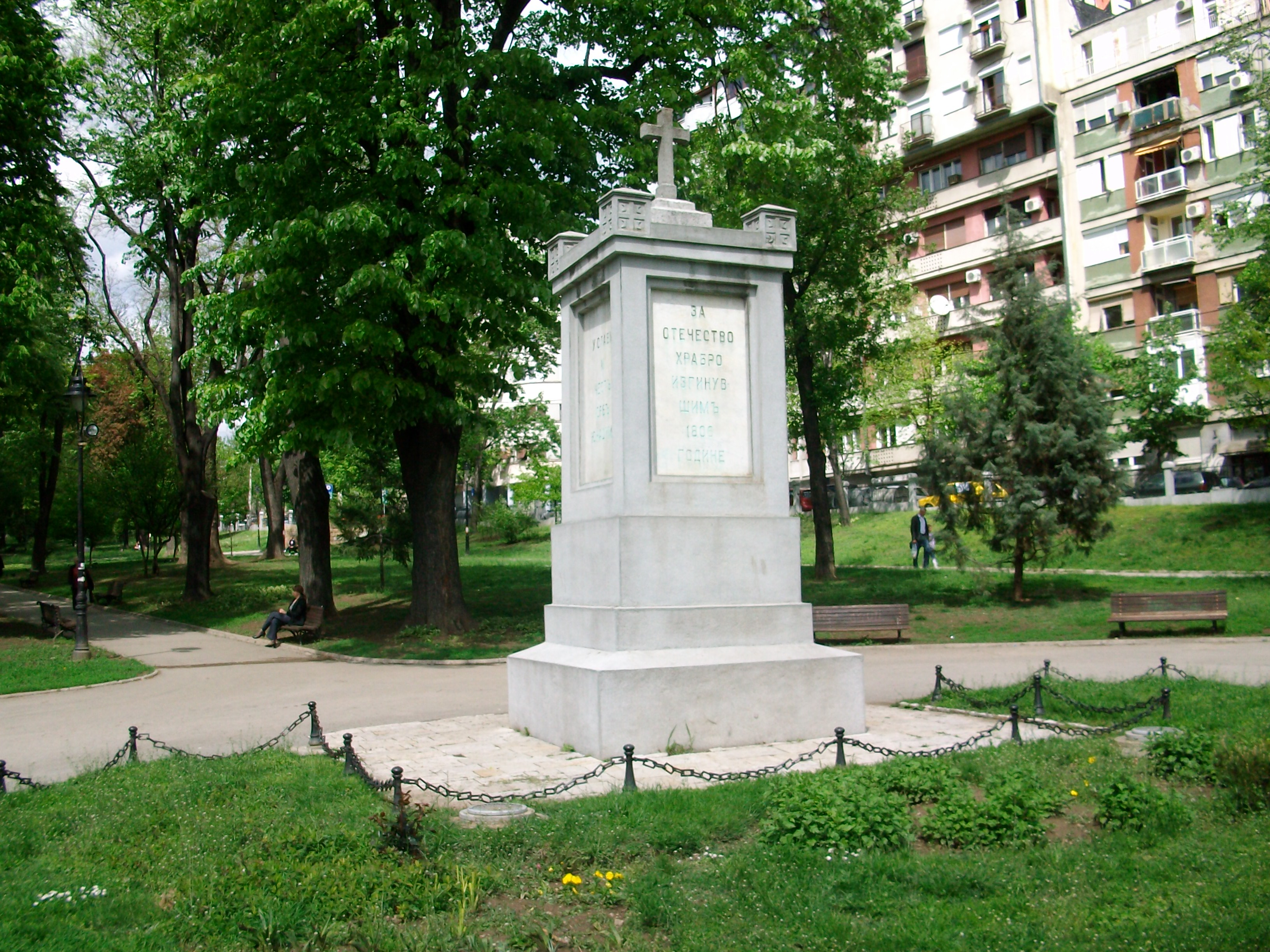
- Monument to the Liberators of Belgrade 1806

Location
- Location: Belgrade
- Municipality: Vračar
- Country: Serbia
- Interactive map of Monument and the Cemetery to the Liberators of Belgrade

Architecture
- Completed: 1926

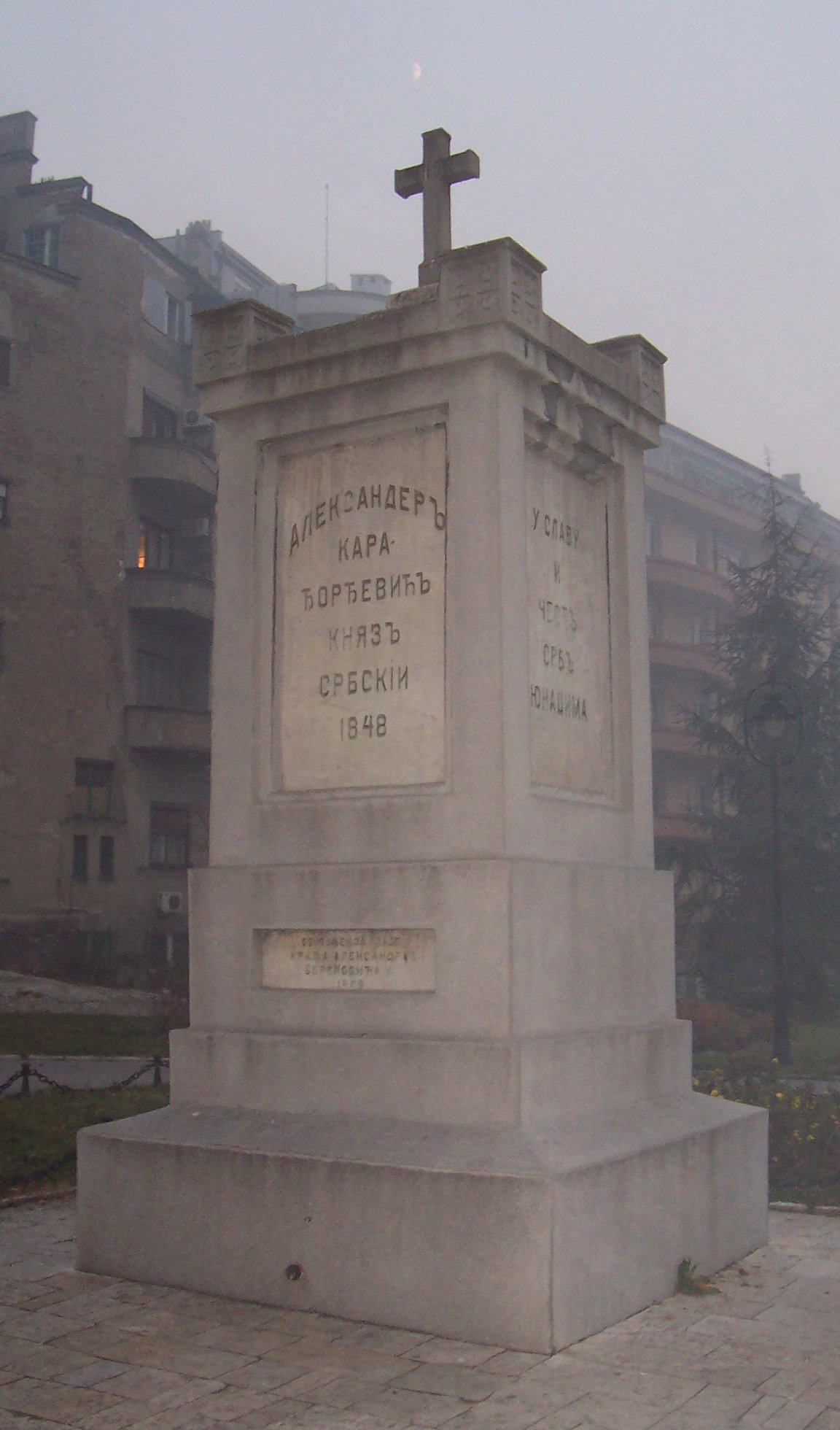
Monument to the Insurgents

Monument to the Liberators of Belgrade in Karađorđe's Park is an authentic historical place of the camp of the main insurgent army and of the military cemetery of the liberators of Belgrade under Karađorđe during the Siege of Belgrade in 1806. The monument in the cemetery was erected by Prince Aleksandar Karađorđević in 1848. It is the first monument in Belgrade erected in the honour of a historical event, and at the same time the first public monument.

== Overview ==
The park itself, with the cemetery and the monument is the only place with preserved authentic material remains that document the sojourn of the insurgent army in Belgrade, and evoke the memory of the capturing of Belgrade in 1806. The last remains of the insurgents' cemetery, which occupied a large part of the park, are the remaining twelve tombstones placed in a row during the reconstruction of the park. These memorials with stylized crosses and zig-zag lines resemble in type the rural tombstones from that period in the area around Belgrade. The monument from 1848 is very modest in form and in decoration. It is 547 cm high, made of yellowish stone and covered with the artificial stone. The marble plaques mounted on the sides bear the text of dedication and the text about the renovation of the monument in 1889.

Karađorđev Park is an authentic historical place of the camp of the main insurgent army and the place of the military cemetery of the liberators of Belgrade under Karađorđe in 1806. The last remains of the insurgents' cemetery, which occupied a large part of the park, are the remaining twelve tombstones placed in a row during the reconstruction of the park. These memorials with stylized crosses and zig zag lines resemble in type the rural tombstones from that period in the area around Belgrade.

== Description ==
The monument is built of the ashlar stone and covered with artificial stone. It is constructed in the style of neoclassicism. In the base there is a three-levelled pedestal with cubic form on the top, with the inscriptions in marble, on all four sides. The finishing part in the corners has rectangular protuberances with the emblem of Serbia, while on the top there is a cross with the inscription on the front and the back side: The year of 1806. The memorial has double religious and national symbolism and represents one of the first public monuments erected in Belgrade and in Serbia. The form and the function originate from the public religious monuments built in the area of the Habsburg monarchy, under the jurisdiction of the Metropolitanate of Karlovci. On all four sides of the monument there are marble plaques with engraved inscription, which flows continuously: Aleksandar Karađorđevićthe Prince of Serbia, 1848, in the honour and glory of the Serbian heroes who bravely died for their homeland in 1806, erects this monument. Subsequently, the plaque with was added, with the inscription, dedicated to the reconstruction of the monument: Reconstructed during the reign of King Aleksandar Karađorđević V.

== See also ==
- Spisak spomenika kulture u Beogradu
