= Francis Mackenzie (missionary) =

British missionary (1833–1895)

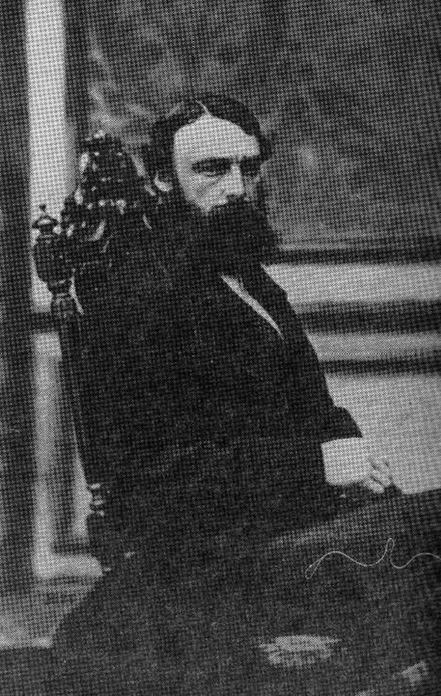
- Born: 1833; Scotland
- Died: 1895 (aged 61–62); Belgrade, Kingdom of Serbia
- Occupation: Nazarene missionary
- Known for: contribution to the development of the City of Belgrade

Francis Mackenzie, was a Scottish member of the Plymouth Brethren Nazarene group, who travelled to Belgrade to start work for the British and Foreign Bible Society to foster religious observance among the people of Principality of Serbia. He stayed in Belgrade from 1876 till 1895.

== Biography ==
He settled there when the Turks left, as did many Austrians, Germans, Czechs, and Italians. He was a prominent figure in Belgrade society and a friend of many Serbian politicians including Čedomilj Mijatović, who was the Serbian Foreign Minister. Mackenzie became very wealthy and influential and correctly predicted that Belgrade's city limits would spread eastwards. In 1879, he bought a large piece of agricultural and swampy land named “Simić’s Majur” from the son of president/chairman of Serbian Parliament-Council Stojan Simić for 7500 Dukats (gold coins). He parceled it out into lots for selling and sold them much later when out of the money he earned, he built a large Peace Hall (Sala Mira) which was renowned for political events. He was also known for policies such as not allowing restaurants on his land and forbidding smoking in all public places, which were generally disliked and eventually failed. Mackenzie contributed around eight thousand square meters of his land for the construction of the Temple of Saint Sava. His and the names of his heirs were inscribed in the list of Great Benefactors, right after the members of the royal family and senior church dignitaries.

A street in Vračar was named after him: Francis Mackenzie Street (Serbian: Макензијева or Makenzijeva).

== Historical references ==
- Beogradske opštinske novine - Belgrade City Newspaper, 1894
- Beograd-Izdanje opstine beogradske 1911
- Zapisi starog Beogradjanina 2000
- Iz starog Beograda - Zivorad P. Jovanovic, 1964
- Siluete starog Beograda - Milan Jovanovic - Stojimirovic, 1971
- Uspon Beograda, Milivoje M.Kostic, 2000
- Beogradske gradske pijace, JKP Beogradske pijace, 1999
- Vracarski glasnik, 1997-2004
